= Tumangang =

Neighbourhood of Rason, North Korea

Tumangang 두만강동
- Neighbourhood
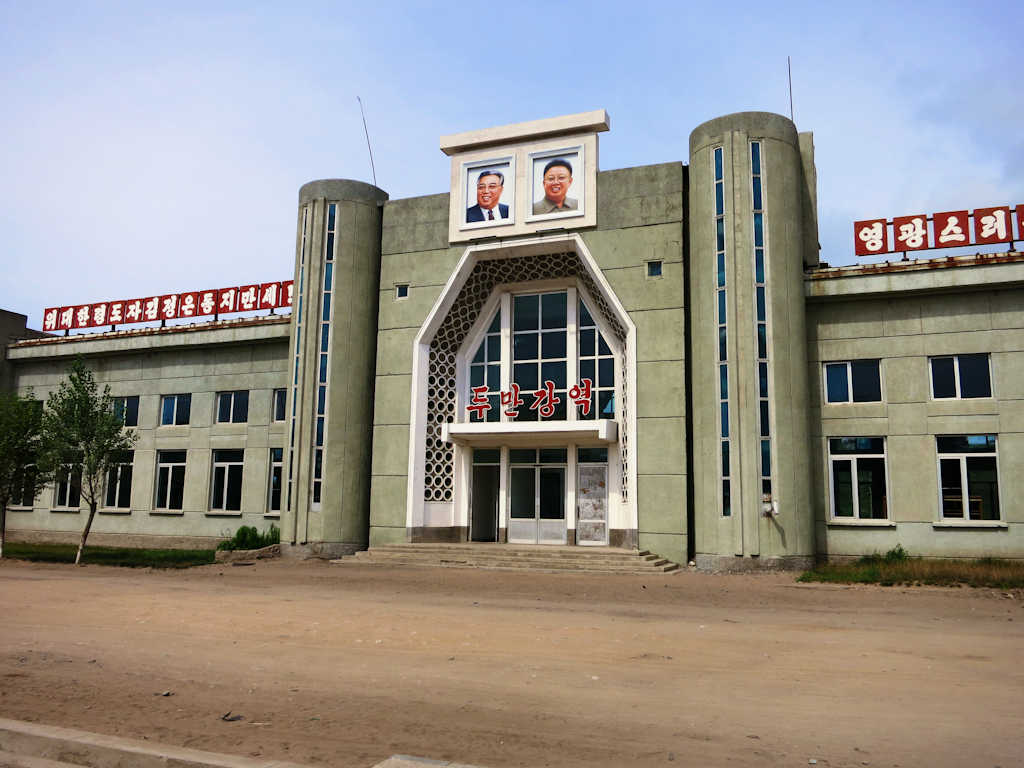
- The entrance to Tumangang station in 2015
- Interactive map of Tumangang
- Coordinates: 42°25′18″N 130°36′9″E
- Country: North Korea
- Special city: Rason
- Ward: Sonbong
- Time zone: UTC+9 (KST)

- Tumangang
- Chosŏn'gŭl: 두만강동
- Hancha: 豆滿江洞
- Revised Romanization: Dumangang-dong
- McCune–Reischauer: Tuman'gang-dong

Tumangang (Korean: 두만강동, lit. 'Tumen River neighbourhood') is a neighbourhood of Sonbong ward (guyok) in Rason, North Korea, near the China–North Korea–Russia tripoint where the three countries meet. It is located across the homonymous Tumen River from the Russian settlement of Khasan and the Chinese village of Fangchuan. Tumangang and Khasan are connected by the a rail bridge and a road bridge, the Korea Russia Friendship Bridge and Yakov Novichenko Bridge, respectively. They are the only two crossing points on the 17-kilometre (11 mi) long North Korea–Russia border. Trains coming from and going to Russia are handled by Tumangang station.

== Location ==
Tumangang is officially a neighbourhood of Sonbong ward (guyok) in Rason, but it has also been described unofficially as a town in its own right. It is bordered by China and Russia to the north, and is located near the China–North Korea–Russia tripoint where the three countries' borders converge. The neighbourhood is home to the DPRK–Russia Friendship House and the Three Countries Viewpoint, where visitors can see Khasan in Russia and Fangchuan in China from afar.

== Transportation ==
Tumangang station is an important transit point on the Moscow–Rason railway line, which facilitates trade and travel between North Korea and Russia. It is the first stop for Russian goods entering North Korea and the last stop for North Korean goods entering Russia. The station is the primary reason for the neighbourhood's existence. Tumangang and Khasan are connected by a rail bridge, the Korea Russia Friendship Bridge, built in 1959 to replace a temporary wooden bridge.

In 2025, it was reported that North Korea and Russia had begun laying the foundations for a new road bridge a short distance downriver from the Korea Russia Friendship Bridge. The road bridge was opened on 7 September 2026 as the Yakov Novichenko Bridge, named for the Soviet military officer Yakov Novichenko, who shielded North Korean leader Kim Il Sung from an assassination attempted in 1946.

== Economy ==
The Vladivostok-based company Vostok-Energia began importing beer from Tumangang in 2025.
