= Rason Special Economic Zone =

Special economic zone in North Korea

Coordinates: 42°22′N 130°25′E

- Chosŏn'gŭl: 라진선봉 경제특구
- Hancha: 羅津先鋒經濟特區
- Revised Romanization: Rajin-Seonbong Gyeongje Teukgu
- McCune–Reischauer: Rajin-Sŏnbong Kyŏngche T'ŭkku

The Rason Special Economic Zone, earlier called the Rajin-Sonbong Economic Special Zone, was established by the North Korean government at Rason, bordering China and Russia, in 1991 to promote economic growth through foreign investment. It is similar to the special economic zones of China and elsewhere, set up to pilot market economics in a designated controlled area. Foreign currency may be used in the zone. Chinese and Russian companies have invested in the special economic zone, and Mongolia joined in about 2013.

The Rason Special Economic Zone is administered by the Committee for Promotion of External Economic Cooperation (CPEEC). Foreign companies must be invited by the CPEEC to operate in the zone.

== Geography ==
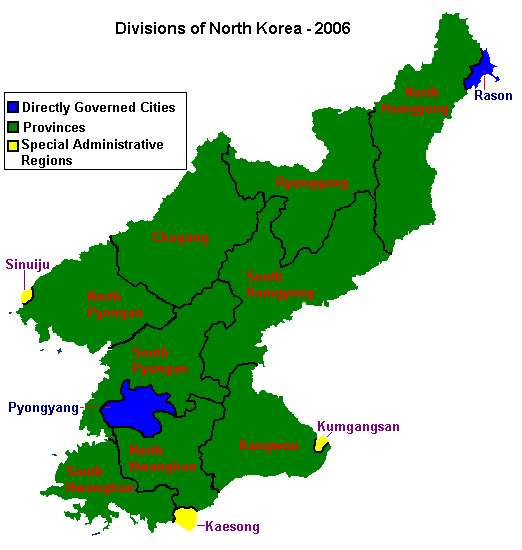
Administrative map of North Korea

The 746 km^{2} (288 sq. mi.) Rason Special Economic Zone is in the north-eastern part of North Korea. It includes the easternmost point of the country. Its eastern boundary is the Tumen River, which is also North Korea's border with China and Russia. Rason has the northernmost port in Northeast Asia that is ice-free all year, and so the port is used by the two neighbouring countries. The zone is between 42 08'-42 38'N and 130 07'-130 42'E.

According to North Korean Economy Watch, it is surrounded by a 56-kilometre (35 mi) long electrified fence.

== History ==
The zone was founded as the Rajin Free Economic and Trade Zone in December 1991. It was expanded to become the Rajin-Sonbong Free Economic and Trade Zone in September 1993. Since its creation, laws governing the zone's status have been amended six times, the most recent revision being approved by the Presidium of the Supreme People's Assembly on 3 December 2011.

By the end of 1996, US$37.3259 million had been invested into the zone by 51 foreign businesses. The UNIDO estimated the investment would increase to $150 million by the end of 1997.

In August 2012, an international trade fair was held, offering foreign investors and journalists a look at the work-in-progress. The zone was slated to be a manufacturing, tourism, and transportation hub. However, some analysts thought it was more a project for experimenting with a capitalist economy, rather than using it as a basis for transforming the economy of North Korea.

The first North-South joint venture company in Rason Special Economic Zone, called Chilbosanmeri Joint Company, was approved in 2010.

Bloomberg reported that ground was broken in June 2011 on a further development stage of the zone. In November 2011, work began on building electricity transmission lines that will provide Chinese electricity supplies in the zone.

When Jang Sung-taek was purged in late 2013, the accusations against him included the charge that he had "made no scruple of committing such act of treachery in May last as selling off the land of the Rason economic and trade zone to a foreign country."

== History of foreign business legislation ==
From 1993 to 2012, there was a single law titled 'Law of the Democratic People's Republic of Korea on the Rason Economic and Trade Zone', which did not include specific details of the business environment, leaving foreign investors with many questions. The first Rason SEZ Law launched in 1993 contained chapters of Fundamentals, Duties and Rights of Operation Committee, Guarantee of Economy Activities, Customs Duties, Currency and Finance, Guarantee and Preferential Treatment and Settlement of Disputes. The basic framework was continued until 2011, when it made modifications on Development and Management of the Zone, Establishment of Enterprises, Economic and Trade Activities and Incentives and Preferential Treatment, providing more details of the environment for foreign-invested companies. However it still did not cover all basically required details for foreign-investor companies, such as regulations of labor, tax, or financial management.

From 2014, North Korea started to acknowledge the necessity of a more complex and comprehensive legal framework. It adopted more specific regulations regarding legal fields such as Labor Regulations for Foreign-invested Businesses and Regulations of Financial Management of Foreign-invested Businesses. Furthermore, bylaws for Taxation and Establishment and Operation of Businesses appeared. According to the latest Rason SEZ law published in 2016, there are total 16 regulations included in the collection of laws, with at least 3 additional regulations enacted.

In October 2013 and May 2014, international conferences on special economic zones took place, and the concept of many provincial economic zones was considered. However from 2019 these possibilities have diminished, partly out of a concern of excessive foreign influence on North Korean society.

== Transport ==
Chinese investors have renovated the Tumen River Bridge from Rason to China, and Russian railway workers have renovated the railway Korea–Russia Friendship Bridge from Rason (which is on the Pyongra Line) to Russia, from where it continues onto the Trans-Siberian Railway. The newly opened Yakov Novichenko Bridge also connects between Khasan in Russia and Rason.

There are three ports in the area: the Rajin Port (handling capacity of 3 million tons), the Sonbong Port (handling capacity of 2–3 million tons), and the Chongjin Port (handling capacity of 8 million tons). Chinese companies operate two piers at the Rajin Port for coal export and containers. A Russian company operates a third pier.

== Foreign investments ==
- Pipa Tourist Hotel
- Ra-Son Economic Co-operation Company
- Foreign Economic Co-operation Corporation
- Korea Joint Venture Group
- Samgwang Trading Company
- Korea Machinery Trading Company
- Korea Daesong B Trading Corporation
- Opalsam Trading Company
- Korea Rungra 888 Trading Corporation
- Korea Ponghwa General Corporation
- Pyongyang Aluminium Products Factory
- Korea Osoksan Trading Company
- Light Industry Products Trading Company
- Korea Samtaesong General Group
- Korea Pyongchon Trading Corporation
- Golden Triangle Bank
- Yanbian Tianyu International Trade Company

== See also ==
- Kaesŏng Industrial Region
- Sinuiju Special Administrative Region
