= Sonbong-guyok =

Coordinates: 42°21′N 130°24′E

Seonbong-guyeok 선봉구역
- Ward

Korean transcription(s)
  - Hancha: 先鋒區域
  - McCune-Reischauer: Sŏnbong-guyŏk
  - Revised Romanization: Seonbong-guyeok
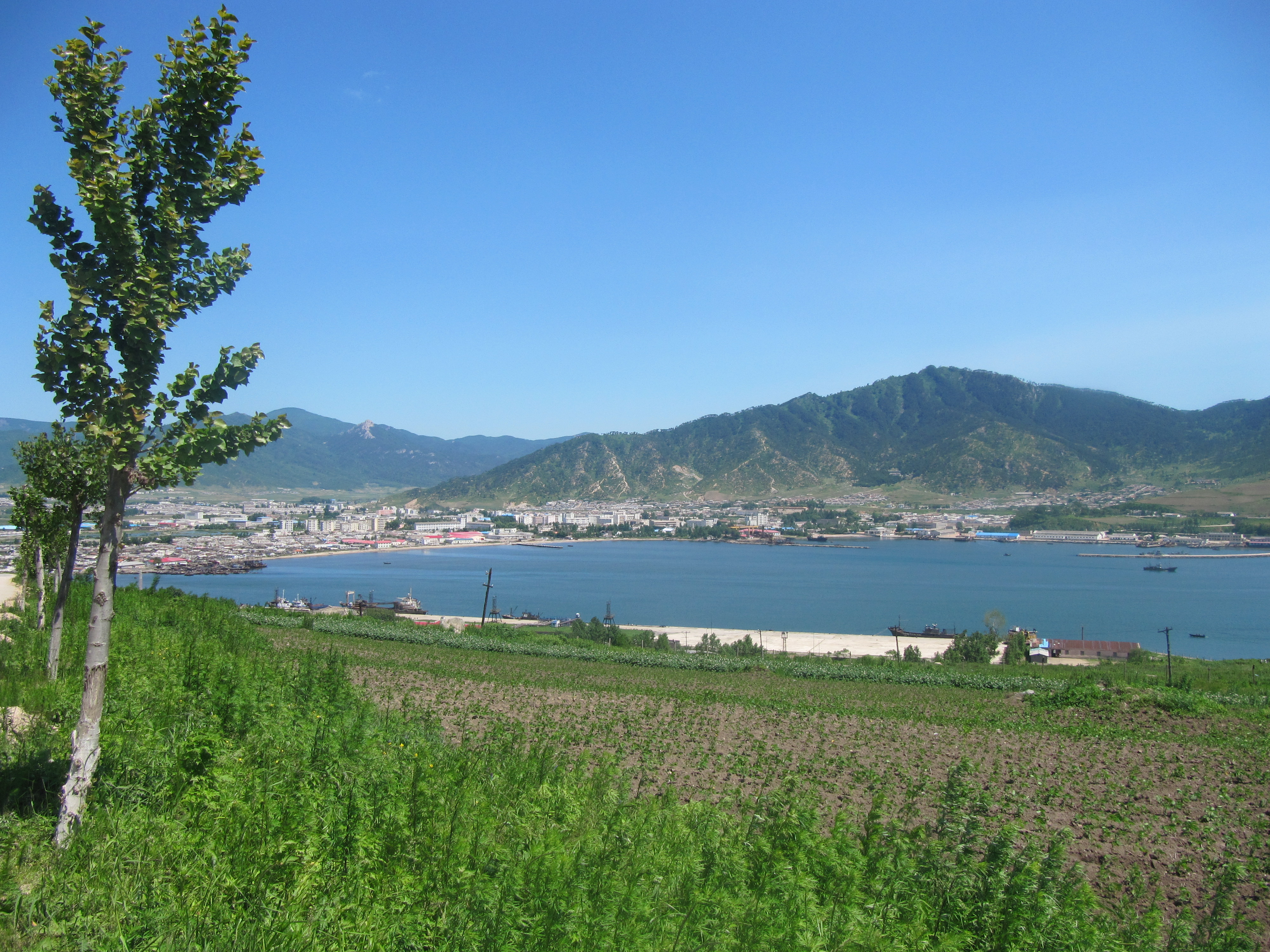
- Interactive map of Seonbong-guyeok
- Country: North Korea
- Special City: Rasŏn-tŭkpyŏlsi
- Administrative divisions: 14 tong, 6 ri

Population
  - Total: 27,331

Sŏnbong-guyŏk, formerly called Unggi (Korean: 웅기; Hanja: 雄基), is a subdivision of the North Korean city of Rason. It is located at the northeastern extreme of North Korea, bordering Russia and China. It lies on Unggi Bay, an extension of the Sea of Japan (East Sea of Korea). A uranium mine is allegedly located there, as is a 200 megawatt oil-fired power plant. The word Sonbong means "Vanguard" in Korean.

The Sonbong Revolutionary Site is dedicated to a visit by Kim Jong-suk in November 1945 "upholding the policy of building a new country advanced by President Kim Il Sung" after the liberation of Korea. It includes the Sonbong Revolutionary Museum, a monument to the historic site, and the house where she stayed.

== Administrative divisions ==
Sŏnbong-guyŏk is divided into 10 tong (neighbourhoods) and 6 ri (villages):

- Sanghyŏn-tong (상현동 / 上峴洞)
- Chunghyŏn-tong (중현동 / 中峴洞)
- Hahyŏn-tong (하현동 / 下峴洞)
- Songp'yŏng-tong (송평동 / 松坪洞)
- Tuman'gang-tong (두만강동 / 豆滿江洞)
- Ungsang-tong (웅상동 / 雄尙洞)
- Uam-tong (우암동 / 牛岩洞)
- Paekhang-tong (백학동 / 白鶴洞)
- Wŏnjŏng-tong (원정동 / 元汀洞)
- Hayŏp'yŏng-tong (하여평동 / 下汝坪洞)
- Kulp'o-ri (굴포리 / 屈浦里)
- Pup'o-ri (부포리 / 鮒浦里)
- Sahoe-ri (사회리 / 四會里)
- Chosal-li (조산리 / 造山里)
- Hahoe-ri (하회리 / 下檜里)
- Hongŭi-ri (홍의리 / 洪儀里)

== Climate ==
Sonbong has a humid continental climate (Dfb) with mild to warm, rainy summers and cold, long winters. Seasons are somewhat moderated by the presence of the Sea of Japan.

Climate data for Sonbong County (1991–2020 normals)
Month	Jan	Feb	Mar	Apr	May	Jun	Jul	Aug	Sep	Oct	Nov	Dec	Year
Mean daily maximum °C (°F)	−1.9 (28.6)	0.7 (33.3)	5.8 (42.4)	12.1 (53.8)	16.2 (61.2)	19.3 (66.7)	23.0 (73.4)	25.2 (77.4)	22.2 (72.0)	15.9 (60.6)	7.1 (44.8)	0.0 (32.0)	12.1 (53.9)
Daily mean °C (°F)	−6.6 (20.1)	−4.4 (24.1)	0.8 (33.4)	6.8 (44.2)	11.3 (52.3)	15.7 (60.3)	20.0 (68.0)	21.6 (70.9)	17.2 (63.0)	10.3 (50.5)	2.1 (35.8)	−4.6 (23.7)	7.5 (45.5)
Mean daily minimum °C (°F)	−11.5 (11.3)	−9.5 (14.9)	−4.0 (24.8)	2.0 (35.6)	7.6 (45.7)	13.0 (55.4)	17.7 (63.9)	18.4 (65.1)	12.2 (54.0)	4.7 (40.5)	−2.6 (27.3)	−9.0 (15.8)	3.2 (37.9)
Average precipitation mm (inches)	4.7 (0.19)	7.6 (0.30)	16.9 (0.67)	33.5 (1.32)	83.0 (3.27)	92.4 (3.64)	164.4 (6.47)	153.0 (6.02)	85.2 (3.35)	45.1 (1.78)	22.6 (0.89)	7.1 (0.28)	715.5 (28.18)
Average precipitation days (≥ 0.1 mm)	2.1	2.9	3.7	5.4	10.5	12.9	14.6	12.5	7.2	4.6	4.3	3.5	84.2
Average snowy days	3.9	3.4	4.0	0.9	0.1	0.1	0.0	0.1	0.1	0.2	3.5	4.7	21.0
Average relative humidity (%)	57.6	60.5	65.5	71.4	81.2	88.4	90.4	86.8	79.2	70.4	64.9	59.1	73.0
Source: Korea Meteorological Administration

== Transportation ==
The Tumen River Bridge crosses the Tumen River and links the road route between Hunchun City in China and Wonjong-tong, Sonbong in North Korea.

Sonbong is North Korea's rail link to Russia. A rail bridge crosses the Tumen River between the border rail stations of Tumangang Workers' District, Sonbong, and Khasan, Russia. This connection lies on one of two proposed paths for linking South Korea by rail to the Trans-Siberian Railroad and the rest of Eurasia, the other being through Sinuiju. The rail link through Sonbong is lightly used, carrying only 10,000 passengers in 2005.

In 2025, it was reported that North Korea and Russia had begun laying the foundations for a new road bridge a short distance downriver from the Korea Russia Friendship Bridge. The road bridge was opened on 7 September 2026 as the Yakov Novichenko Bridge, named for the Soviet military officer Yakov Novichenko, who shielded North Korean leader Kim Il Sung from an assassination attempted in 1946.

Sonbong is one terminus of the Hambuk Line railroad. It is also served by roads.

There is a seaport and a wharf at Sonbong Port.

== See also ==
- List of cities in North Korea
- Geography of North Korea
