= Rajin-guyok =

District in Rason, North Korea

Coordinates: 42°20′24″N 130°23′23″E

Rajin-guyok 라진구역
- Ward

Korean transcription(s)
  - Hanja: 羅津區域
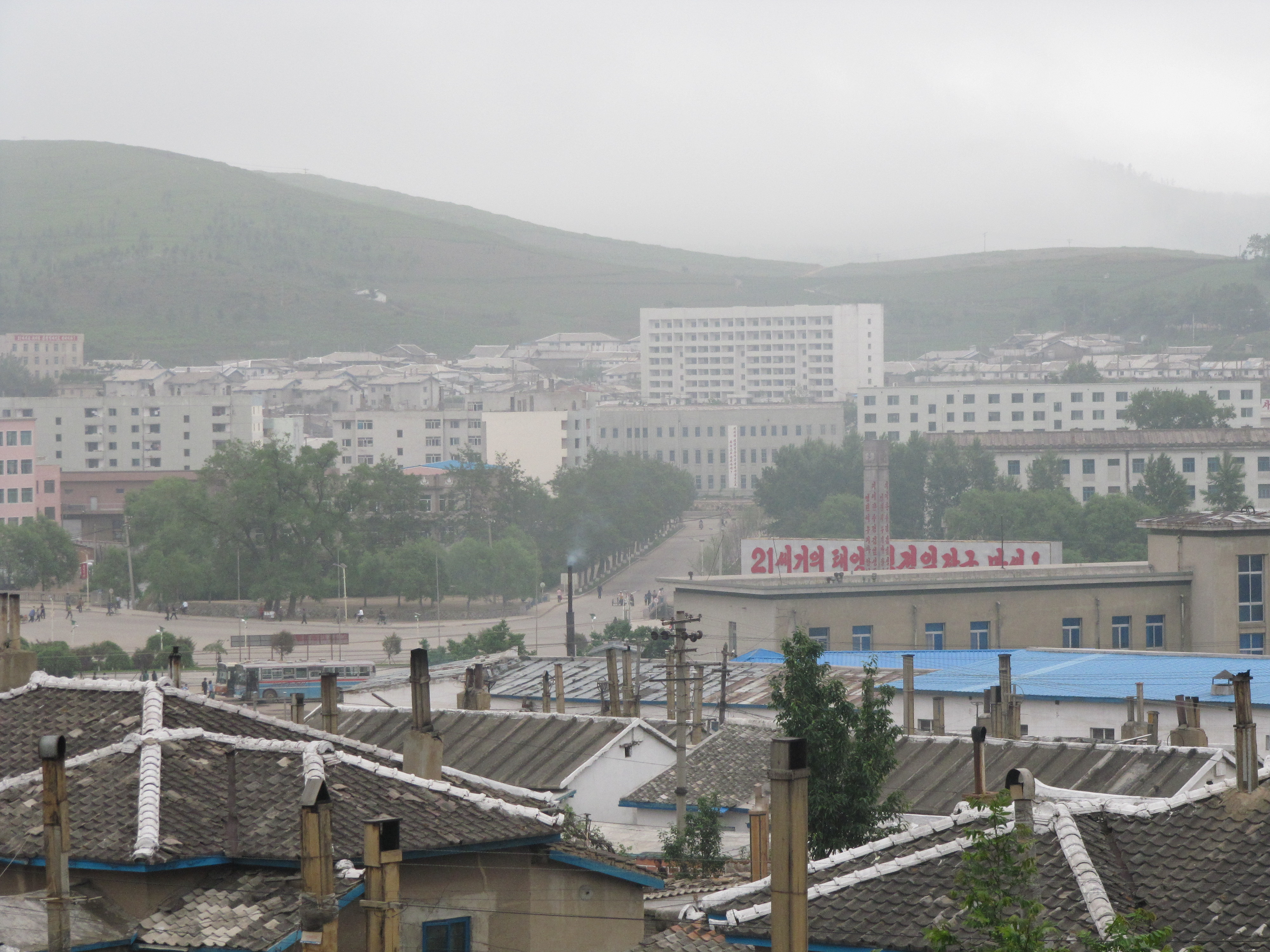
- Interactive map of Rajin-guyok
- Country: North Korea
- Special city: Rasŏn-T'ŭkpyŏlsi
- Administrative divisions: 18 tong, 2 ri

Rajin-guyŏk (Korean pronunciation: [ɾadʑin ɡujʌk]) is a North Korean ward on Rason in the Sea of Japan (East Sea of Korea) in the North Pacific Ocean on the northeast tip of North Korea. It is in the Kwanbuk region and location in the south of Rason. North of it lies the North Korea–Russia border.

== Transport ==
Rajin Station is the terminus of both the P'yŏngra and Hambuk lines of the Korean State Railway.

The Khasan–Rajin railway was opened in 1959, connecting the Port of Rajin with the Russian Khasan on the Tumen River; the river is the natural North Korea–Russia border. The railway had been renewed between 2008 and 2013. Coal transport from North Korea to Khasan on the renewed line started in summer 2014. As the track was built using four rails both Russian broad gauge as well as Korean standard gauge trains can access the port of Rajin.

A new Russian-North Korean terminal was commissioned in Rajin. Along with cargo transshipment and storage, the terminal makes it possible to organize coal magnetic cleaning and coal separating. Thus, the pilot part of the project aimed at the reconstruction of the Trans-Korean railway from Russia's Khasan to the seaport of Rajin just over the border.

== Administrative divisions ==
Sŏnbong-guyŏk is divided into 18 tong (neighbourhoods) and 2 ri (villages):

- Anhwa-tong (안화동 / 安和洞)
- Anju-tong (안주동 / 安住洞)
- Jigyŏng-tong (지경동 / 地境洞)
- Junghyŏn-tong (중현동 / 中峴洞)
- Changphyŏng-tong (창평동 / 倉坪洞)
- Chŏnggye-tong (청계동 / 淸溪洞)
- Hahyŏn-tong (하현동 / 下峴洞)
- Haebang-tong (해방동 / 解放洞)
- Kwangok-tong (관곡동 / 寬谷洞)
- Namsan-tong (남산동 / 南山洞)
- Tongmyŏng-tong (동명동 / 東明洞)
- Sanghyŏn-tong (상현동 / 上峴洞)
- Sinan-tong (신안동 / 新安洞)
- Sinhae-tong (신해동 / 新海洞)
- Sinhŭng-tong (신흥동 / 新興洞)
- Songphyŏng-tong (송평동 / 松坪洞)
- Yŏkchŏn-tong (역전동 / 驛前洞)
- Yuhyŏn-tong (유현동 / 踰峴洞)
- Muchang-ri (무창리 / 武倉里)
- Huchang-ri (후창리 / 厚倉里)
