= Khasan (urban-type settlement) =

Khasan Хасан
- Urban-type settlement
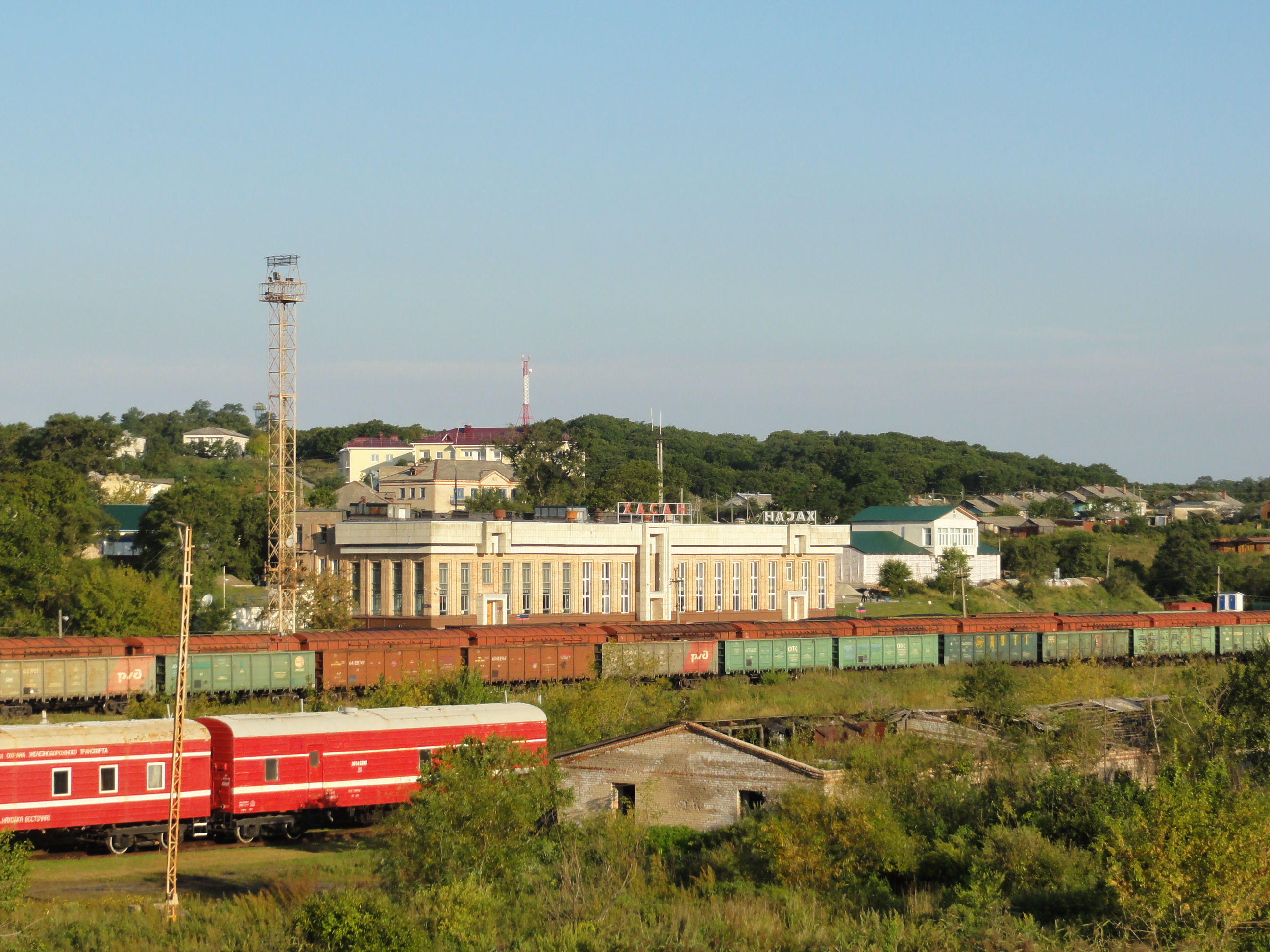
- Khasan station
- Interactive map of Khasan
- Location of Khasan Khasan (Primorsky Krai)
- Coordinates: 42°25′42″N 130°38′44″E
- Country: Russia
- Federal subject: Primorsky Krai
- Administrative district: Khasansky District
- Founded: 1959
- Urban-type settlement status since: 1983

Government
  - Leader: Ivan Stepanov

Population (2010 Census)
  - Total: 742
  - Estimate (2023): 469 (−36.8%)
- Time zone: UTC+10 (MSK+7)
- Postal code: 692700
- OKTMO ID: 05648170051
- Website: khasanskoeposelenie.ru

Khasan (Russian: Хаса́н) is an urban locality (an urban-type settlement) in Khasansky District of Primorsky Krai, Russia. It is located near the tripoint on the Tumen River where the borders of Russia, China and North Korea converge. Population: 742 (2010 census); 795 (2002 census); 1,187 (1989 Soviet census).

== Geography ==
Khasan is the only Russian-inhabited locality on the border with North Korea. It lies near Lake Khasan and the Tumen River. The border between Russia and North Korea is formed by the river, but the Tumen's course sometimes changes during floods, effectively diminishing the territory of Russia and threatening to flood the settlement of Khasan and the Peschanaya border station. Since 2003, work has been progressing to reinforce the area with rocky soil for protection against erosion by the river. There is an unobtrusive Russian outpost near the border with a large radar array. On the North Korean side of the border lies Tumangang. The closest Chinese settlement is the village of Fangchuan.

== Transportation ==
=== Rail ===
Khasan has a railway station on the Baranovsky-Khasan railway line from Vladivostok to Rason in North Korea. It is the link between Russia and North Korea, by a rail bridge over the Tumen River called the Korean-Russian Friendship Bridge (Korean: 조로친선교). The North Korean station in Tumangang Workers' District, Sonbong, is directly across the river.

Construction began on the railway line from Baranovsky railway station to a point 190 km away in the direction opposite of Kraskino, and was completed in 1941. After World War II, the Baranovski-Kraskino line was continued to the border with North Korea, resulting in a total length of 238 kilometers (148 mi). The end of the line was the Khasan station, located near Lake Khasan. The Khasan station opened for operation on September 28, 1951. It has long remained a dead-end: across the Tumen River, which forms the state border, a temporary wooden bridge was built, which carried its first working train into Korea in 1952. Exchange of goods between the Soviet Union and North Korea by rail through the Khasan station began in 1954. Sixty-five cars or 1,300 tons of cargo were exported from North Korea, with 153 cars or 3,123 tons of cargo being imported. In 1955, 530 cars or 7,200 tons were exported from North Korea, while 295 cars or 4,800 tons of cargo were imported. Two years later, Khasan station exports had grown an incredible fourteen-fold and imports sixteen-fold. The temporary wooden bridge was inadequate for the increasing traffic, so in 1959 a joint decision was made to build a bridge with metal spans on stone abutments, called the "Friendship Bridge". It was commissioned on August 9, 1959. There is a break of gauge between the two railroads since the Russian railroad system is 1,520 mm (4 ft 11 27/32 in) and the North Korean railroad system is 1,435 mm (4 ft 8 1/2 in) standard gauge.

This line is currently little used, with only 10,000 passengers being carried in 2005. In 1988, the two-way cargo traffic exceeded 5 million tons annually, but by 2001 the total volume had dropped to only 144,000 tons. In 1989, 830,000 tons of freight passed through the border from Russia (Khasan) to North Korea (Tumangang). By 1998 this number stood at 150,000 tons, and by 2001, only 92,000 tons of freight crossed the border, according to the Far East customs office. The Korean portion from Tumangang to the port of Rajin was destroyed in the 1950s.

Throughout the 1990s, the state of the railroad deteriorated sharply due to the economic crisis in Russia. By 1996, North Korea owed $20 million to the Russian railway operator, Russian Railways. This debt had accumulated over the previous 5 years as North Korea seized and used Russian train cars that were in North Korea. The situation led to the Ministry of Railways of Russia issuing a directive forbidding the passage of trains from Khasan to North Korea, effectively isolating North Korea from the Russian market. The crisis was resolved in September 1996, when North Korea agreed to pay $26 million of the debt.

==== Reconstruction ====
At the beginning of the 21st century the situation improved, and capital investments were made to improve and modernize the railway system in the area. The rail station got a new roof in 2002, and the railroad bed was raised, using crushed stones, in 2002/3. In 2001, Russian Railways laid a fiber optic link from Ussuriysk to Khasan railway station, which made it possible to connect Khasan to the unified data system of the trains in the Far East.

In April 2008, Russia and North Korea signed a long-awaited deal to rebuild the railway line to North Korea. Under the deal, the two countries will renovate the rail line from Russia's border town of Khasan to the North Korean port of Rajin, where sea cargo to and from North Korea could be unloaded. To implement the project, the Russian Railways Trading House and the Port of Rajin set up a joint venture. It will ensure investments in the project, as well as employing contractors for design and construction work. The joint venture is to last 49 years, with 70 percent of the shares belonging to Russia and 30 percent to North Korea. Russian railwaymen began renovating the Khasan-Rajin railway section in October 2008, and a demonstration train ran on the Rajin-Khasan route in October 2011. By the following February, a new dual gauge with the length of 32 kilometres has been laid at the Rajin-Khasan section, complete overhaul of 20 kilometres of the tracks has been made, railroad switches and tracks were installed, a number of stations reconstructed, the work in the tunnels was started, trunk telecommunication lines and electrical interlocking lines were stretched and drainage structures restored. Coal transport from North Korea started in summer 2014.

=== Road ===
The reconstructed Khasan-Razdolnoye Road connecting Khasan, the ports of Zarubino and Posyet, and the settlement of Razdolnoye, Nadezhdinsky District was completed in November 2007. In April 2015 Deputy Ministers of Transport of Russia and North Korea, Nikolai Asaul and Kwok Il-ryong, signed an agreement on developing a road connection between Russia and North Korea.

In 2025, it was reported that North Korea and Russia had begun laying the foundations for a new road bridge a short distance downriver from the Korea Russia Friendship Bridge. The road bridge was opened on 7 September 2026 as the Yakov Novichenko Bridge, named for the Soviet military officer Yakov Novichenko, who shielded North Korean leader Kim Il Sung from an assassination attempted in 1946.

== Climate ==
Khasan has a four-season humid continental climate (Dfb) typical of Primorsky Krai. Due to its sheltered and southerly location, it contains lesser seasonal swings than northerly inland areas. As typical of this area of the world, the East Asian monsoon in summer and the Siberian High in winter are the main drivers of the local climate, resulting in wet and humid and also warm to hot summers. August temperatures are around 21.7 °C (71.1 °F) in terms of mean temperatures, bordering on a hot-summer subtype of the climate type (Köppen climate classification Dwa). This is followed by cold and dry winters.

Climate data for Khasan
Month	Jan	Feb	Mar	Apr	May	Jun	Jul	Aug	Sep	Oct	Nov	Dec	Year
Mean daily maximum °C (°F)	−4.7 (23.5)	−1.2 (29.8)	4.7 (40.5)	11.1 (52.0)	15.5 (59.9)	19.6 (67.3)	23.0 (73.4)	24.6 (76.3)	21.0 (69.8)	14.4 (57.9)	5.2 (41.4)	−2.8 (27.0)	10.9 (51.6)
Daily mean °C (°F)	−8.5 (16.7)	−5.5 (22.1)	0.5 (32.9)	6.7 (44.1)	11.6 (52.9)	16.3 (61.3)	20.3 (68.5)	21.7 (71.1)	17.4 (63.3)	10.5 (50.9)	1.6 (34.9)	−6.2 (20.8)	7.2 (45.0)
Mean daily minimum °C (°F)	−12.3 (9.9)	−9.6 (14.7)	−3.4 (25.9)	2.6 (36.7)	8.1 (46.6)	13.5 (56.3)	18.1 (64.6)	19.3 (66.7)	14.2 (57.6)	6.8 (44.2)	−1.6 (29.1)	−9.7 (14.5)	3.8 (38.9)
Average precipitation mm (inches)	15 (0.6)	15 (0.6)	24 (0.9)	44 (1.7)	82 (3.2)	77 (3.0)	140 (5.5)	137 (5.4)	78 (3.1)	47 (1.9)	36 (1.4)	19 (0.7)	714 (28)

== See also ==
- Battle of Lake Khasan
- North Korea–Russia relations
