= Korean border =

Korean border may refer to:

- China–North Korea border, terrestrial and maritime border
- North Korea–Russia border, terrestrial and maritime border
- Japan–South Korea border, maritime border; see Category:Japan–South Korea border
- Korean Demilitarized Zone, terrestrial boundary between North and South Korea
- Northern Limit Line, disputed maritime demarcation line between North and South Korea
