= China–North Korea–Russia tripoint =

Meeting point of China, Russia and North Korea

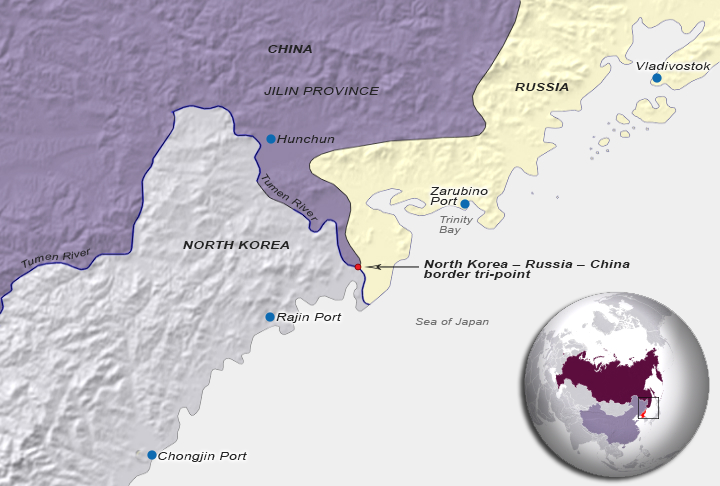
Map of the tripoint region

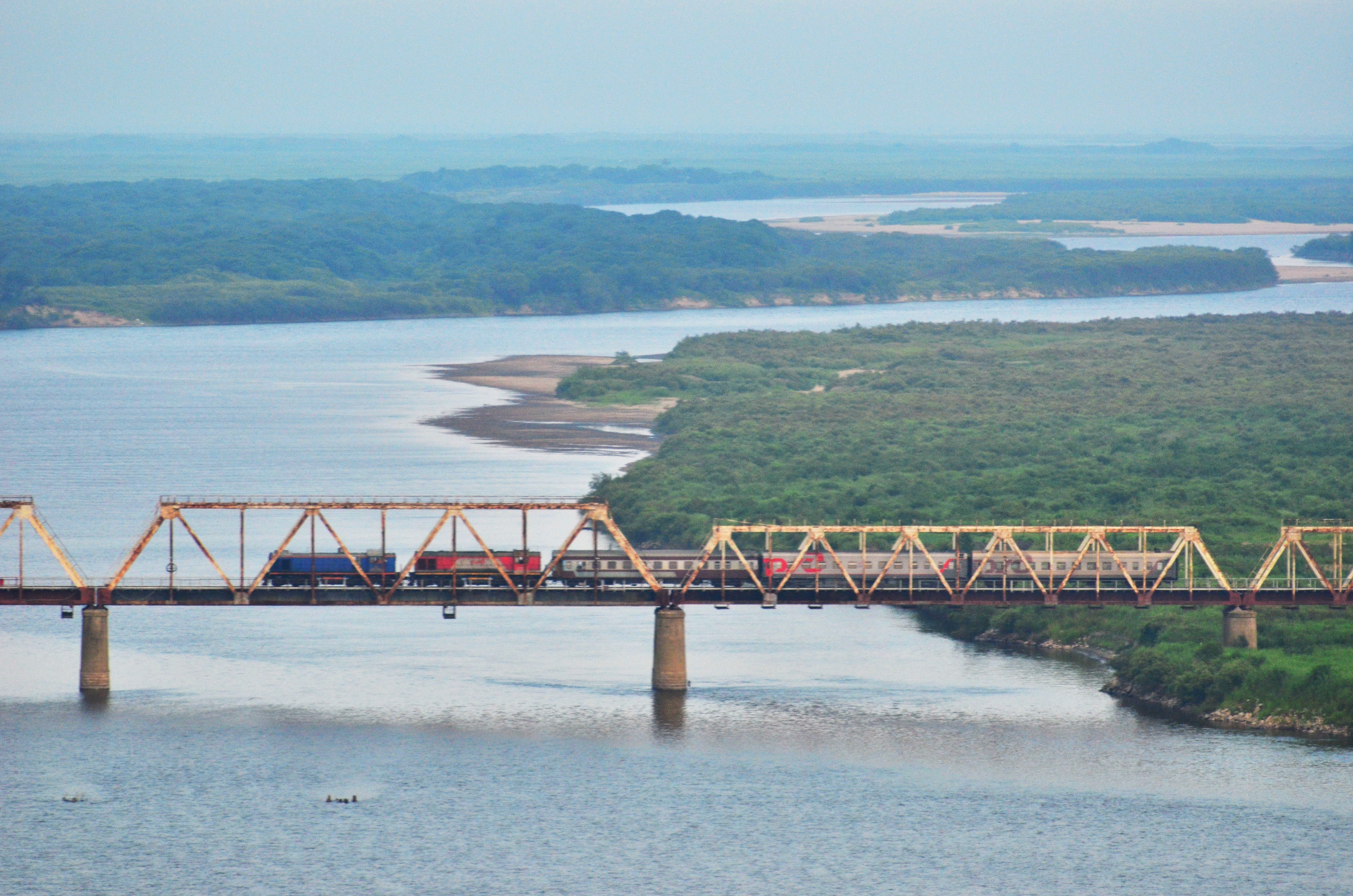
Korea Russia Friendship Bridge viewed in Fangchuan Village, China

The China–North Korea–Russia tripoint (Chinese: 中、朝、俄三国交界点; Korean: 중국·북한·러시아 3국 접점; Russian: Точка стыка границ Китая, КНДР и России, romanized: Tochka styka granits Kitaya, KNDR i Rossii) is the tripoint where the China–Russia border and the North Korea–Russia border intersect. The tripoint is in the Tumen River about 500 meters upstream from Korea–Russia Friendship Bridge and under 2,000 meters from the Russian settlement of Khasan.

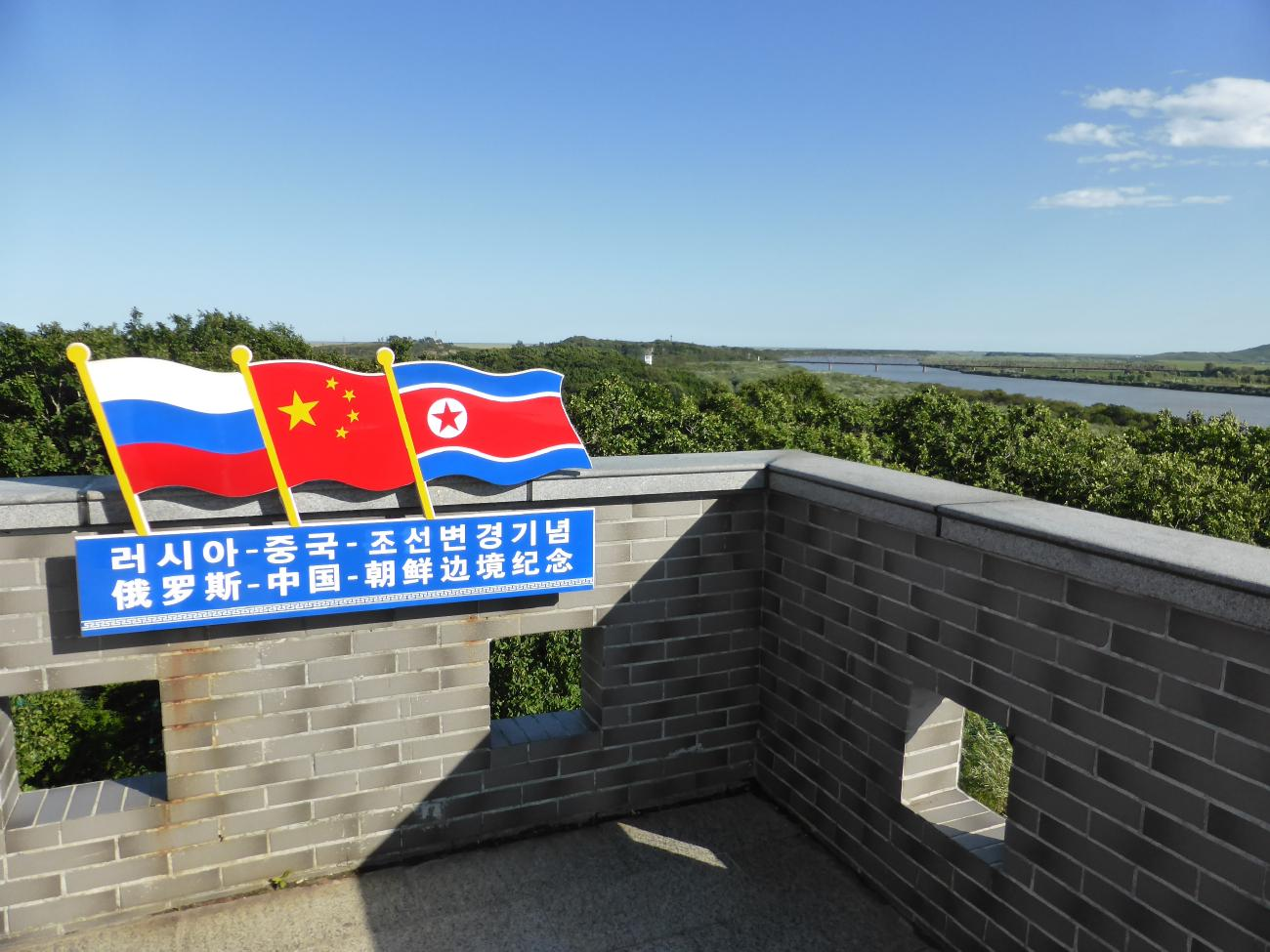
The China–North Korea–Russia triangulation station in Fangchuan, China

== Markers ==
Three granite shoreside markers, which are in effect triangulation stations, are specified in the 1985 treaty defining the tripoint, which is "a straight line running along the perpendicular from border sign No. 423 on the Russian-Chinese state border to the line of the middle of the main channel of the Tumannaya River between both banks of the river."

- Boundary marker no. 423, Russia–China border (treaty number 1; left bank) - 42°25′10.2″N 130°38′17.7″E (Pyongyang datum) 42.419787°N 130.639275°E (WGS-84)
- Korea marker (treaty number 2; right bank) - 42°24′59.5″N 130°38′06.5″E
- Russia marker (treaty number 3; left bank) - coordinates to be amended

== Description ==
The terrestrial boundary between Russia and North Korea runs along the fairway (thalweg) of the Tumen River and its estuary, whist the maritime boundary separates the two countries' territorial waters in the Sea of Japan.

The principal border treaty was signed on April 17, 1985. A separate, trilateral treaty specifies the position of the tripoint of the borders of Russia, North Korea, and China. The North Korea–Russia and China–North Korea borders run along the middle of the Tumen River, whilst the China–Russia border approaches the junction point overland from the north. Because the theoretical tripoint is in the middle of the river, where it would be impractical to install a border monument, the protocol is that the three countries install border monuments on the riverbank, and that the position of the tripoint be determined with respect to the monuments themselves. The Chinese trig station is popular with Chinese tourists, affording as it does a view of North Korea.

The administrative unit on the Russian side of the border is the Khasansky District of Primorsky Krai, on the Korean side, the city of Rason, and on the Chinese side Fangchuan. The main Russian border guard station in the area is Peschanaya.

=== Border line vis-a-vis border zone ===
One interpretation of various treaties is that a China–North Korea border zone exists in the river (or even an international condominium), in which case there would not be a point where all three countries' sovereign territory meet.
