= Fangchuan =

Ethnic Korean village in Jilin, China

Fangchuan 防川 · 방천
- Village
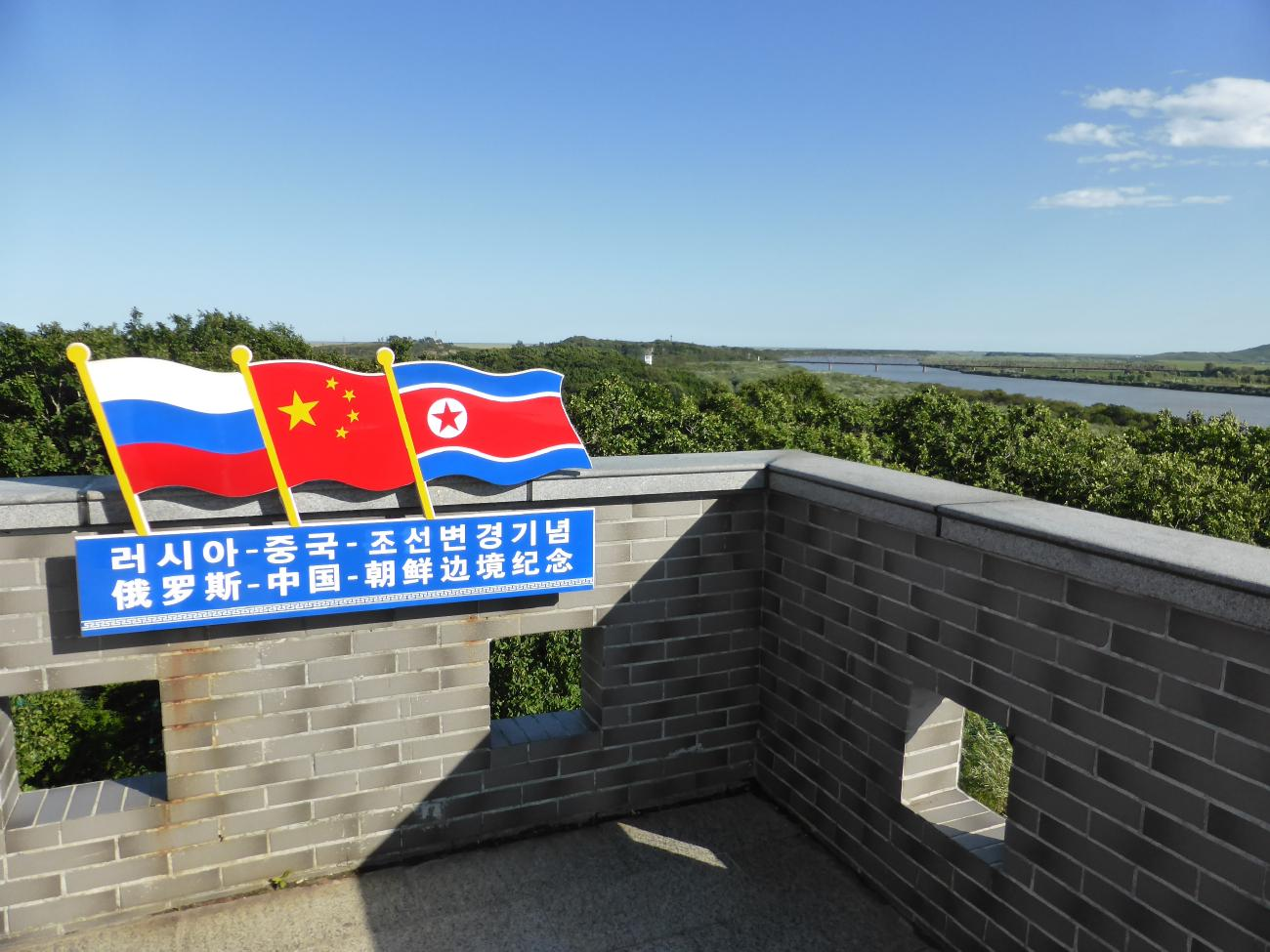
- China–North Korea–Russia tripoint monument in Fangchuan
- Nickname: First Village of the East
- Interactive map of Fangchuan
- Location of Fangchuan in China Fangchuan (China)
- Coordinates: 42°26′19″N 130°35′40″E
- Country: China
- Province: Jilin
- Autonomous prefecture: Yanbian
- County-level city: Hunchun
- Town: Jingxin

Area
  - Total: 14 km^{2} (5.4 sq mi)
- Elevation: 5 m (16 ft)

Population (2018)
  - Total: 100
  - Density: 7.1/km^{2} (18/sq mi)
- Time zone: UTC+8 (CST)
- Area code: 0431

Fangchuan village
- Chinese: 防川村
Transcriptions
Standard Mandarin
- Hanyu Pinyin: Fángchuān cūn

Chinese Korean name
- Chosŏn'gŭl: 방천촌
Transcriptions
- Revised Romanization: Bangcheon-chon
- McCune–Reischauer: Pangch'ŏn-ch'on

Fangchuan (Chinese: 防川; Korean: 방천) is a village in Yanbian Korean Autonomous Prefecture, Jilin, China. It is located near the tripoint where China's borders with North Korea and Russia intersect. Administratively, it is part of the town of Jingxin, itself a part of Hunchun, the easternmost city of Yanbian. The 100 residents who live in Fangchuan are all ethnic Koreans (as of 2018).

== Geography ==
Fangchuan is located along the Tumen River, near the China–North Korea–Russia tripoint where the borders of the three countries converge. Nearby settlements along the border include Tumangang in North Korea and Khasan in Russia. Historically, Fangchuan had access to Lake Khasan and the Sea of Japan (located 15 km (9.3 mi) away), but access is now cut off by North Korean and Russian territory.

== Administration ==
The village is administered as part of Jingxin, a town which is under the jurisdiction of Hunchun, the easternmost city of Yanbian Korean Autonomous Prefecture.

== Tourism ==
The Chinese government promotes Fangchuan as an open-air folk museum and a symbol of interethnic unity between the Han Chinese and (Chinese) Koreans. Fangchuan's official nickname is the "First Village of the East" (东方第一村; 동방제1촌).

Visitors to the top floor of Longhu Pavilion (龙虎阁; 'Dragon and Tiger Pavilion') can view China, North Korea, and Russia all "in one glance".

The village is surrounded by the Fangchuan National Scenic Area, a designated tourist zone. It covers 20 square kilometres (7.7 sq mi) of mountainous, forested terrain. The area has a temperate, maritime, monsoon climate that is mild and humid, suitable for a variety of flora and fauna, including several species of endangered birds. Locals sell seafood caught in nearby waters, such as river shrimps (Macrobrachium), river crabs (Eriocheir sinensis), salmon, and crucian carp.

== Demographics ==
As of 2018, the village has about 100 residents, 43 of whom were born in the village, and all of whom are ethnic Koreans.

== See also ==
- Battle of Lake Khasan
