= Lake Manpo and Lake Bonpo Important Bird Area =

Nature reserve in North Korea

Coordinates: 42°21′00″N 130°34′00″E

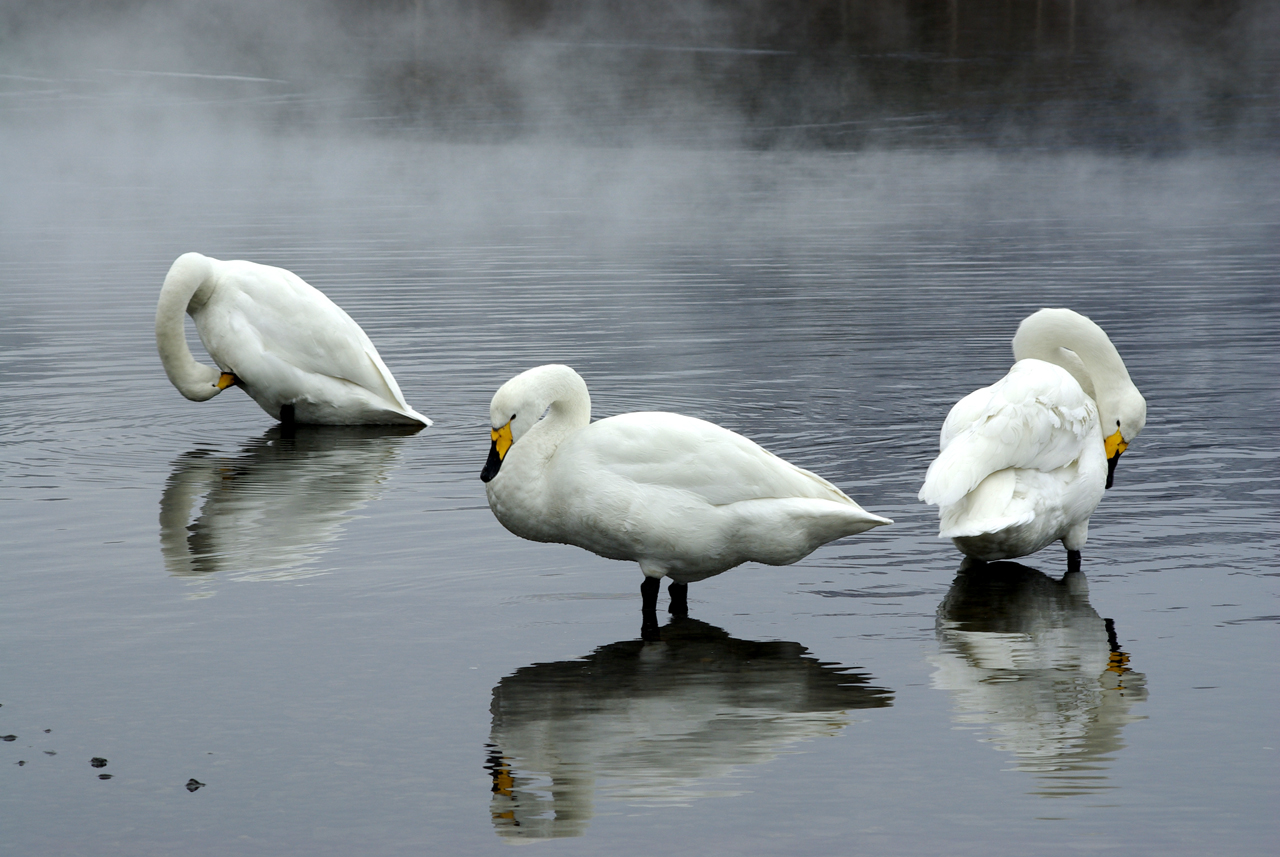
The lakes are important for wintering whooper swans

The Lake Manpo and Lake Bonpo Important Bird Area lies within the Rason Special Economic Zone on the coast of north-eastern North Korea, close to its borders with both China and Russia. The 5880 ha site comprises the freshwater lakes, which lie about 3 km apart, and encompasses the 3200 ha Lake Manpo and Lake Bonpo Protected Area. It has been identified by BirdLife International as an Important Bird Area (IBA) because it supports populations of various water- and wetland birds including swan geese, greater white-fronted geese, whooper swans, Oriental storks, white-naped cranes and red-crowned cranes. It is threatened by planned aquacultural development.
