= Korea–Russia Friendship Bridge =

Bridge between Russia and North Korea

Korea–Russia Friendship Bridge 조선–로씨야 우정의 다리 Мост Дружбы
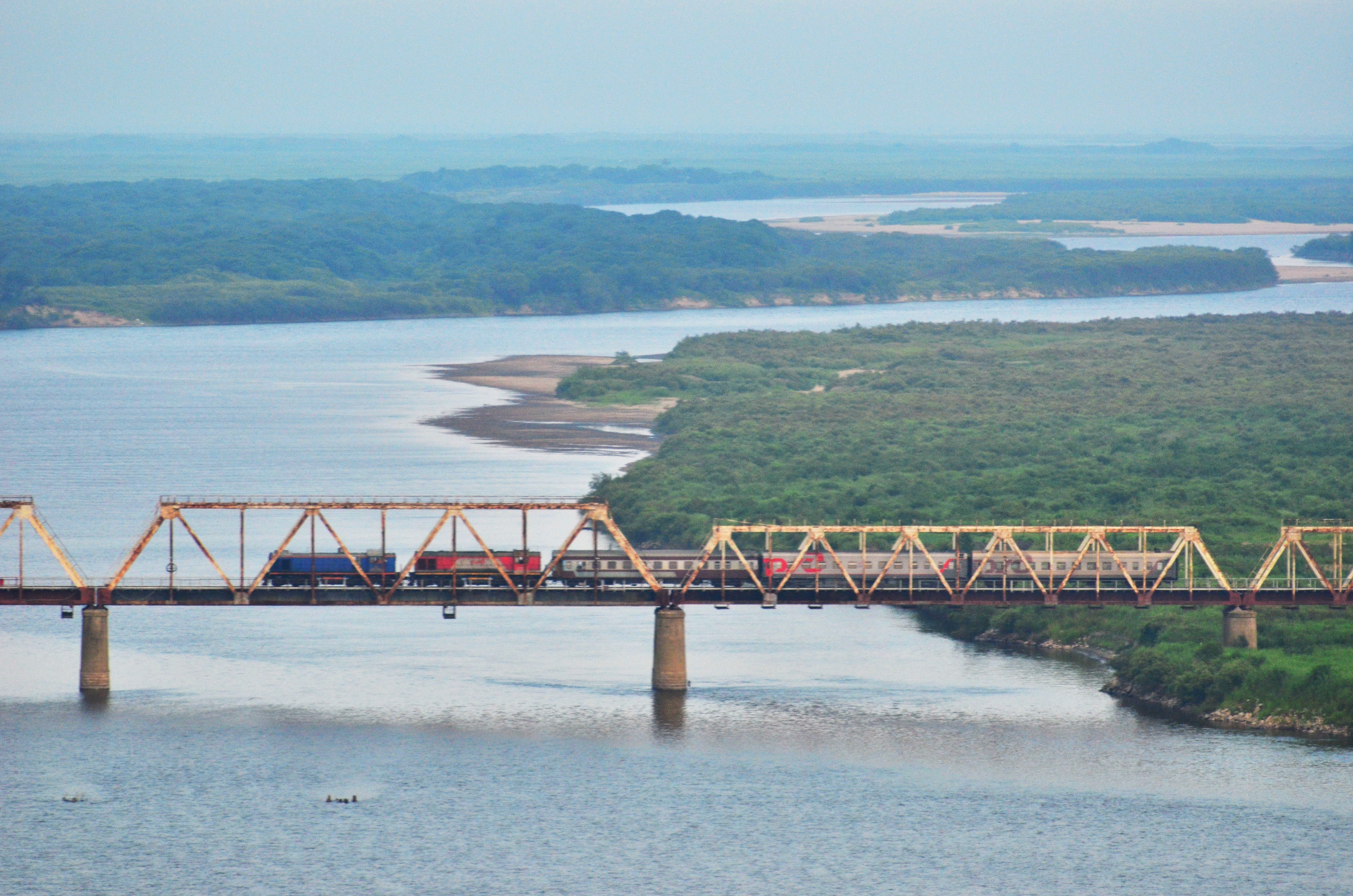
- Friendship Bridge linking North Korea and Russia, as viewed from nearby Chinese territory
- Coordinates: 42°24′55″N 130°38′28″E
- Carries: Trains
- Crosses: Tumen River
- Locale: Khasan, Tumangang

Characteristics
- Design: Truss bridge
- Total length: 623 m (2,044 ft)

History
- Opened: 9 August 1959

Location
- Interactive map of Korea–Russia Friendship Bridge

The Korea–Russia Friendship Bridge (Korean: 조선–로씨야 우정의 다리 Chosŏn–Rossiya Ujŏngŭi Dali, Russian: Мост Дружбы, romanized: Most Druzhby) is a rail bridge over the Tumen River. It was commissioned in 1959 as a replacement for a temporary wooden bridge. Located immediately downstream from the China–North Korea–Russia tripoint, the bridge is one of only two crossing points on the 39.1 km long North Korea–Russia border and the only one for rail, the other one being the Yakov Novichenko Bridge for cars that opened in September 2026.

Planks are laid between the tracks making crossing of road vehicles possible by special arrangement, but it is primarily a rail bridge. The tracks are dual gauge because the Russian railroad system uses a track gauge of 1,520 mm (4 ft 11 27/32 in)(also called Russian Gauge) while the North Korean system uses 1,435 mm (4 ft 8 1/2 in). The bridge is served by the Khasan railway station on Russian soil and Tumangang Station on the North Korean side of the river.

In October 2017 a fiber optic cable running across the bridge provided North Korea with an additional connection to the global Internet through Russia's TransTelekom provider, a subsidiary of Russian national railway operator Russian Railways. It allows the country to be less dependent on its primary internet connection through China Unicom (similarly running over the Sino-Korean Friendship Bridge), after it was the target of a DDoS attack during the 2017 North Korea crisis.

Use of the bridge was suspended through the COVID-19 pandemic, with use resuming in November 2022.

== See also ==
- North Korea–Russia relations
- Sino-Korean Friendship Bridge
- Baranovsky–Khasan line
- Hongui Line
- List of international bridges
- Yakov Novichenko Bridge
