= Noktundo =

Former island between Russia and North Korea

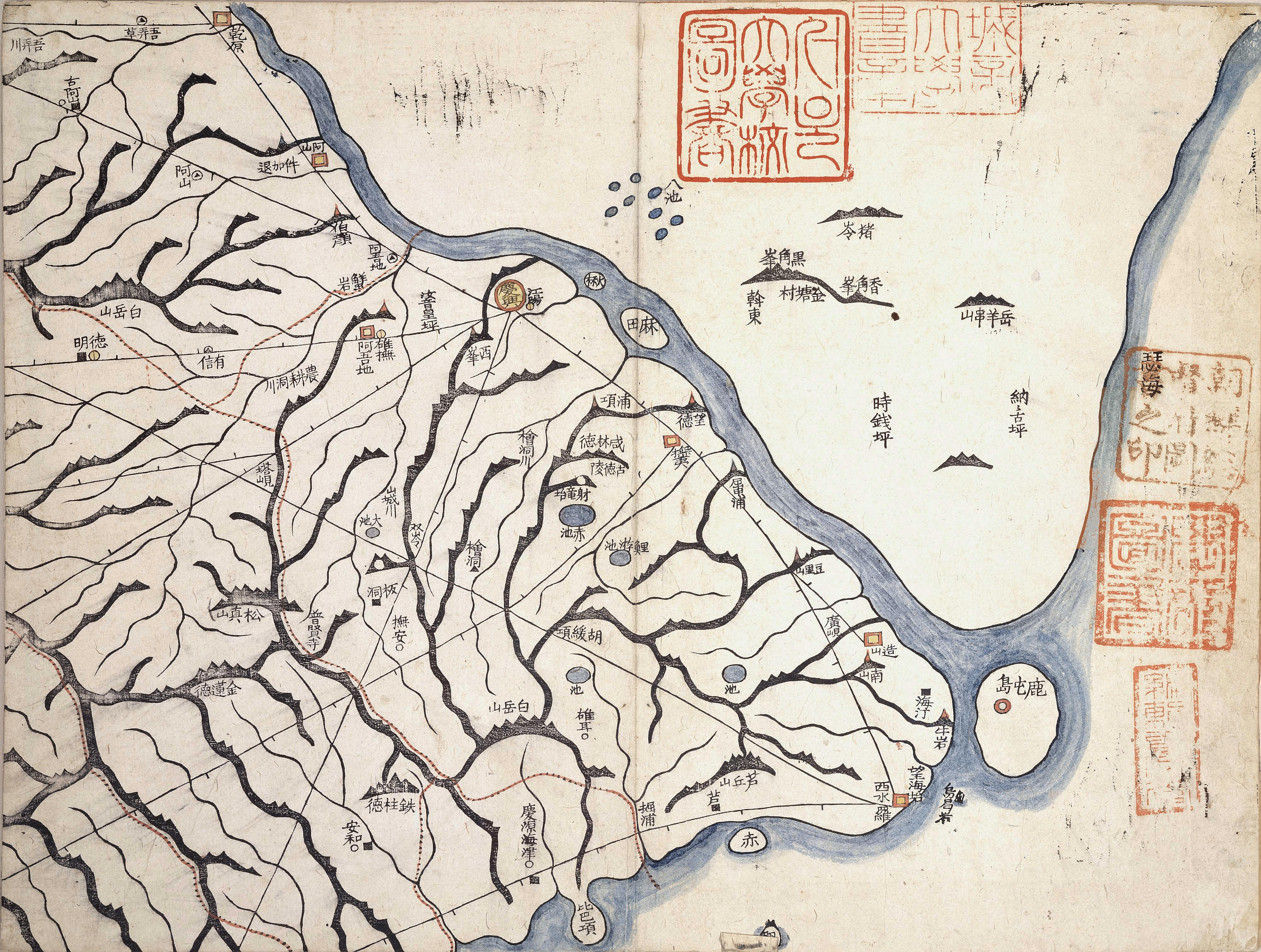

- Location within Primorsky Krai Location within Russia

Geography
- Location: Tumen River

Administration
- Disputed; Russia (controlled); South Korea
- Primorsky Krai (Russia); North Hamgyeong (South Korea)

Noktundo

North Korean name
- Chosŏn'gŭl: 록둔도 / 녹둔도
- Hancha: 鹿屯島
Transcriptions
- Revised Romanization: Nokdundo
- McCune–Reischauer: Noktundo / Roktundo

Russian name
- Russian: Ноктундо

Noktundo (Korean: 록둔도/녹둔도; Russian: Ноктундо, romanized: Noktundo) was an island in the delta of the Tumen River on the border between Primorsky Krai, Russia and North Korea. The area of the island was 32 square kilometres (12 sq mi).

Noktundo had been a Korean territory since the 15th century. The Jurchens took notice of this. In 1587 there was a battle fought on this island between the local Koreans and the invading Jurchens. At first, the Jurchens successfully sacked the island and captured 160 Koreans as prisoners. As they crossed the river back to their camp with the prisoners, the famed Korean general Yi Sun-Shin chased after the invaders, rescued 50 Koreans, and defended the island. With his army, he later infiltrated the nearby Jurchen army camp, and captured their leader alive.

Due to changes in the canal and sand sediment, the island was eventually adjoined to the north shore, which was part of the Qing dynasty.

The island was under Korean control until 1860 when Russia forced the Qing dynasty to cede Outer Manchuria along with Noktundo in the Convention of Peking without any Korean participation. When the Joseon government found this out in the 1880s, this became to the Koreans a matter of protest, as they claimed that the Russians had no authority to do so, and protested against it to the Qing dynasty. In 1990, Soviet Union and North Korea signed a border treaty which made the border run through the center of the river leaving the territory of the former island on the Russian side. South Korea refused to acknowledge the treaty and demanded that Russia return the territory to Korea.

Koreans continued to live on Noktundo until the 1930s, when they were forcibly removed under Joseph Stalin.

== In popular culture ==
- Korean general Yi Sun-Shin's 1587 battle on the island is referenced and shown in the 2022 film Hansan: Rising Dragon directed by Kim Han-min.
