= Gaya River =

River in Jilin, China

Coordinates: 42°58′24″N 129°51′28″E

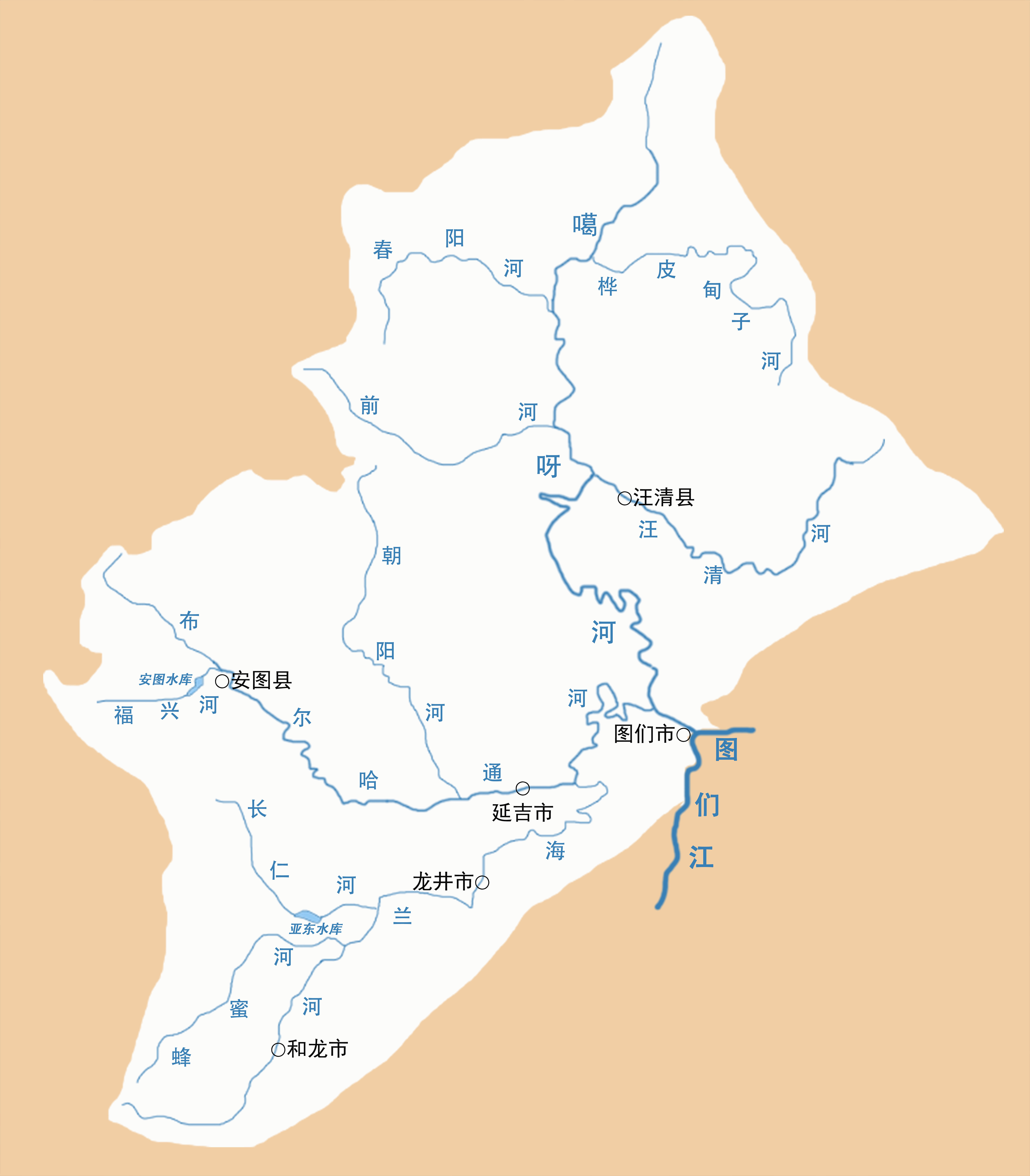
Map of the Gaya River.

The Gaya River (Chinese: 嘎呀河; pinyin: Gāyǎ Hé) is a tributary of the Tumen River in east Jilin province of China. The source of river is located in Wangqing County and flows generally from north to south and joins Tumen River at Tumen City.The river has a length of 205.2 km and drains an area of 13,565 square km.
