= Hunchun River =

River in Jilin, China

Coordinates: 42°43′27.98″N 130°15′1.01″E

Hunchun River (Chinese: 珲春河), is a river located in the Yanbian Korean Autonomous Prefecture, in the Chinese province of Jilin. It is the tributary of the left bank of the Tumen River.
