= Rason =

Coordinates: 42°20′40″N 130°23′04″E

Rason 라선시
- Special city
- 라선특별시 · Rason Special City

Korean transcription(s)
  - Chosŏn'gŭl: 라선특별시
  - Hancha: 羅先特別市
  - McCune-Reischauer: Rasŏn T'ŭkpyŏlsi
  - Revised Romanization: Raseon Teukbyeolsi
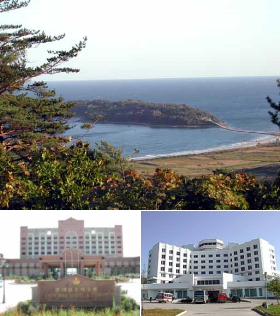
- Bipaseom Island (top), Imperial Hotel and Casino (bottom left), Rason Hotel (bottom right)

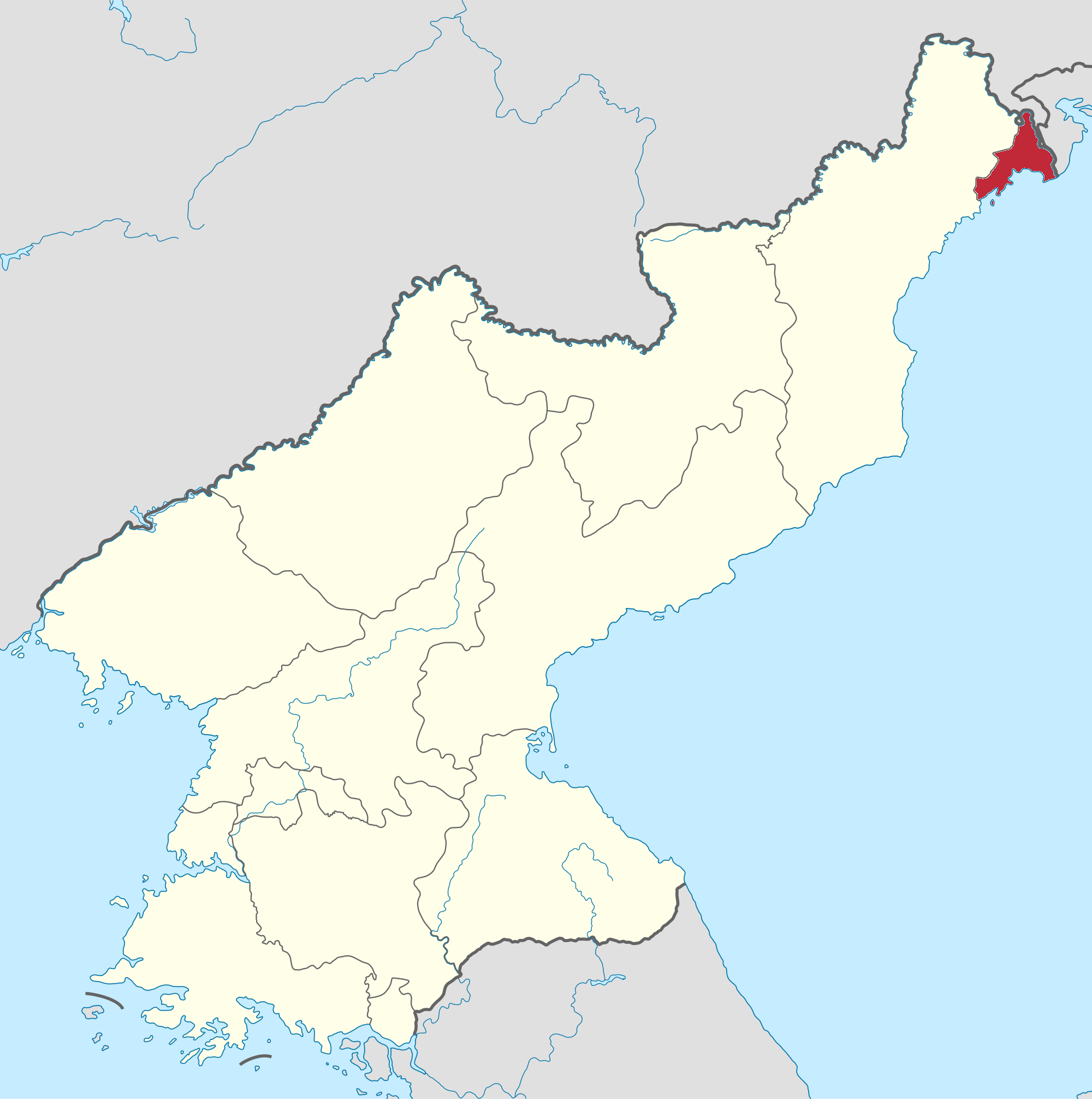
- Country: North Korea
- Region: Kwanbuk

Government
  - Municipal Party Committee Chief Secretary: Shin Young-cheol (WPK)
  - Municipal People's Committee Chairman: Shin Chang-il

Area
  - Total: 746 km^{2} (288 sq mi)
- Elevation: 27 m (89 ft)

Population (2019)
  - Total: 205,000
  - Density: 275/km^{2} (710/sq mi)
  - Dialect: Hamgyŏng
- Time zone: UTC+9 (Pyongyang Time)
- ISO Code: KP-13

Rason (formerly Rajin-Sŏnbong; Korean pronunciation: [ɾa.sʌ̹n, ɾa.dʑin.sʰʌ̹n.boŋ]) is a North Korean special city and ice-free port in the Sea of Japan in the North Pacific Ocean on the northeast tip of North Korea. It is in the Kwanbuk region and location of the Rason Special Economic Zone.

In South Korean pronunciation, the initial "R" of the name is pronounced as "N" (나선, Naseon) as per standard Korean phonology. In 2000, the name was shortened from "Rajin-Sŏnbong" to "Rason". During the 1930s, the Japanese called it Rashin; at that time, it was an important port at the end of a railroad line. It fell under the control of the Red Army on 14 August 1945.

Before 1991, Rason was used by the Soviet Union as an alternative warm-water port in case Vladivostok was unavailable. The Soviet naval facilities were built starting in 1979. From 1993 to 2004, it was administered separately from North Hamgyŏng as the directly governed city (chikhalsi) of Rason. Prior to 1993 and from 2004 to 2009, the city had been part of the North Hamgyŏng Province. Since 2010, the city is a "special city", again breaking from provincial control, but different from its older designation as a directly governed city. What this means in practice is unclear.

Rason borders Hunchun county in Jilin province of China and Khasansky District in Primorsky Krai of Russia. China is making investments in the port as it gives it access to the Sea of Japan. In July 2011, North Korea allowed China's domestic trade cargo to be shipped via its port of Rajin from northeast to east China. Coal is shipped from nearby Chinese mines to Shanghai. A casino by the sea caters to Chinese visitors.

== Administrative divisions ==
Rason is divided into two districts (kuyŏk).

=== Rajin-guyŏk (라진구역; 羅津區域) ===
- Anhwa-dong (안화동 / 安和洞)
- Anju-dong (안주동 / 安住洞)
- Jigyŏng-dong (지경동 / 地境洞)
- Junghyŏn-dong (중현동 / 中峴洞)
- Changphyŏng-dong (창평동 / 倉坪洞)
- Chŏnggye-dong (청계동 / 淸溪洞)
- Hahyŏn-dong (하현동 / 下峴洞)
- Haebang-dong (해방동 / 解放洞)
- Kwangok-dong (관곡동 / 寬谷洞)
- Namsan-dong (남산동 / 南山洞)
- Tongmyŏng-dong (동명동 / 東明洞)
- Sanghyŏn-dong (상현동 / 上峴洞)
- Sinan-dong (신안동 / 新安洞)
- Sinhae-dong (신해동 / 新海洞)
- Sinhŭng-dong (신흥동 / 新興洞)
- Songphyŏng-dong (송평동 / 松坪洞)
- Yŏkchŏn-dong (역전동 / 驛前洞)
- Yuhyŏn-dong (유현동 / 踰峴洞)
- Muchang-ri (무창리 / 武倉里)
- Huchang-ri (후창리 / 厚倉里)

=== Sŏnbong-guyŏk (선봉군; 先鋒郡) ===
- Sŏnbong-ŭp (선봉읍 / 先鋒邑)
- Tuman'gang-rodongjagu (두만강로동자구 / 豆滿江勞動者區)
- Ungsang-rodongjagu (웅상로동자구 / 雄尙勞動者區)
- Chosal-li (조산리 / 造山里)
- Hahoe-ri (하회리 / 下檜里)
- Hayŏp'yŏng-ri (하여평리 / 下汝坪里)
- Hongŭi-ri (홍의리 / 洪儀里)
- Kulp'o-ri (굴포리 / 屈浦里)
- Paekhang-ri (백학리 / 白鶴里)
- Pup'o-ri (부포리 / 鮒浦里)
- Sahoe-ri (사회리 / 四會里)
- Uam-ri (우암리 / 牛岩里)
- Wŏnjŏng-ri (원정리 / 元汀里)

== Climate ==
Rason has a humid continental climate (Köppen climate classification: Dwb).

Climate data for Rason
Month	Jan	Feb	Mar	Apr	May	Jun	Jul	Aug	Sep	Oct	Nov	Dec	Year
Mean daily maximum °C (°F)	−3.8 (25.2)	−1.1 (30.0)	4.4 (39.9)	11.4 (52.5)	16.1 (61.0)	19.0 (66.2)	23.2 (73.8)	24.8 (76.6)	21.3 (70.3)	15.3 (59.5)	6.0 (42.8)	−1.1 (30.0)	11.3 (52.3)
Daily mean °C (°F)	−9.1 (15.6)	−6.8 (19.8)	−1.3 (29.7)	5.2 (41.4)	9.9 (49.8)	14.2 (57.6)	19.1 (66.4)	20.7 (69.3)	16.0 (60.8)	9.4 (48.9)	0.9 (33.6)	−6.2 (20.8)	6.0 (42.8)
Mean daily minimum °C (°F)	−14.4 (6.1)	−12.5 (9.5)	−6.9 (19.6)	−0.9 (30.4)	3.8 (38.8)	9.5 (49.1)	15.0 (59.0)	16.6 (61.9)	10.8 (51.4)	3.5 (38.3)	−4.2 (24.4)	−11.2 (11.8)	0.8 (33.4)
Average precipitation mm (inches)	6 (0.2)	8 (0.3)	21 (0.8)	30 (1.2)	71 (2.8)	101 (4.0)	116 (4.6)	196 (7.7)	114 (4.5)	55 (2.2)	24 (0.9)	10 (0.4)	752 (29.6)
Source: Climate-Data.org

== Port ==
The Korean People's Navy maintains a naval training base at the Rajin Port in the city of Rason. In addition, a Chinese company in 2017 leased a dock for 10 years at the port. This port may also be known as the Port of Rajin.

== Military activity ==
Since North Korea joined the Russo-Ukrainian war, Rason and the wider area surrounding it which borders Russia has been used as a way to transfer arms shipments and manpower to Russia.

== Tourism ==
Since 2025, North Korea has allowed tourism for everyone except American and South Korean citizens to visit the area. The YPT's plans were to immediately open the entire city with Chinese tourists expected first. Given the recent opening, there is no tourism data. However it is confirmed that there are large amounts of Russian and Chinese tourists.

== Economy ==
=== Foreign investments ===
The Rason Emperor Hotel and Casino is a resort and casino in Rason owned by the Emperor Group, a diversified Hong Kong based commercial group.

=== Oil refinery ===
Sŭngri Petrochemical Complex, one of two oil refineries in North Korea, is located in Rason. Although North Korea itself lacks oil wells, they can and do import oil from other countries to supply their refineries. Large oil tankers are spotted multiple times unloading at the Rajin port.

=== Mining ===
Rason has a number of mineral resources within the locality, including coal, iron, magnesite, and clay.

=== Ship building ===
Rason is home to No 28 Shipyard Najin, a shipbuilder and supplier to the Korean People's Navy.

== Transport ==
=== Rail ===
Rajin Station is on the Pyongra Line and Hambuk Line. The Hongui Line was opened in 1959, connecting Rason with the Russian Khasan on the Tumen River; the river is the natural North Korea–Russia border.

=== Road ===
The Tumen River Bridge connects between Hunchun in China and Rason. The newly opened Yakov Novichenko Bridge connects between Khasan in Russia and Rason.

== Sister cities ==
- Hunchun, China

== See also ==
- List of cities in North Korea
- Rajin University of Marine Transport
- Geography of North Korea

== Bibliography ==
- Dormels, Rainer (2014). North Korea's Cities: Industrial facilities, internal structures and typification. Jimoondang. ISBN 978-89-6297-167-5.
