= Yakov Novichenko Bridge =

- Coordinates: 42.412022°N 130.645833°E
- Carries: AH6
- Crosses: Tumen River, North Korea–Russia border
- Locale: Khasan, Tumangang
- Official name: Мост Якова Новиченко (Russian) 야꼬브 노비첸꼬명칭 두만강자동차다리 (Korean)
- Other name(s): DPRK–Russia Road Bridge; Автомобильный мост между Россией и КНДР (Russian) 로씨야-조선민주주의인민공화국을 잇는 자동차 다리 (Korean)
- Named for: Yakov Novichenko

Characteristics
- Design: Girder bridge
- Total length: 1.0057 km (0.6 mi)
- Width: 7 m (23 ft)
- No. of lanes: 2

History
- Constructed by: TunnelYuzhStroy
- Construction start: 30 April 2025
- Opened: 7 September 2026

Location
- Interactive map of Yakov Novichenko Bridge

The Yakov Novichenko Bridge (Russian: мост Якова Новиченко), officially the Tumen River Road Bridge Named after Yakov Novichenko (Korean: 야꼬브 노비첸꼬명칭 두만강자동차다리), alternatively the DPRK–Russia Road Bridge (Russian: Автомобильный мост между Россией и КНДР; Korean: 로씨야-조선민주주의인민공화국을 잇는 자동차 다리) is an international road bridge across the Tumen River on the North Korea–Russia border. The crossing connects Khasan, Russia and Tumangang, North Korea. The bridge supplements the existing Korea–Russia Friendship Bridge through providing a road transit link between the cities of Vladivostok and Chongjin. It is sited approximately 15km upstream from the river's mouth at the Sea of Japan, and approximately 1km downstream from the limit of extent of Chinese territory down the Tumen River.

== Name ==
The bridge is named after the Soviet military officer Yakov Novichenko, who protected Kim Il Sung, the first leader of North Korea, from an assassination attempt in 1946.

== History ==
Since August 1959, the sole crossing point between the Russia and North Korea has been the Korea–Russia Friendship Bridge. Planks are laid between the tracks, making the crossing of road vehicles possible by special arrangement, but it is primarily a rail bridge. Logistics are further complicated by the North Korean railway network primarily using standard-gauge railways, with the Russian gauge line terminating at the port city of Rason. In April 2015, the deputy transport ministers of Russia and North Korea—Nikolai Asaul and Kwok Il-ryong, respectively—signed an agreement to develop a road connection between the two countries.

== Design ==
The bridge spans the Tumen River and is located 415 meters to the east of the existing Korea–Russia Friendship Bridge. The bridge is supported by concrete supports and steel spans of a distance of 1,005.7 meters, with 581.4 meters on the North Korean side and 424.3 meters on the Russian side. The road deck contains two lanes with a width of seven meters. On the Russian side, a 2.4 km road around Khasan was also built.

Border marker on the Tumen River

Markers are located on the bridge above the thalweg of the North Korea–Russia border. Border checkpoints are located on both sides of the bridge. The Tumangang border checkpoint is marked by a large decorated archway, as well as immigration and customs warehouse located nearby. The Khasan border checkpoint is designed to process up to 300 vehicles per day.

The cost of construction is estimated to be approximately 9 billion rubles. In 2025, 120 million rubles for design and 5.38 billion rubles for construction were allocated from the federal budget. The remaining 3.57 billion rubles was planned for 2026.

== Construction ==
Foundation plaque

In February 2025, Russian prime minister Mikhail Mishustin signed government decree no. 157 on the construction of a road bridge between the two countries.

In early 2025, the tender for construction work on the Russian side was awarded to the Sochi based TunnelYuzhStroy. In addition preparatory work began on the Tumangang side in early 2025.

Construction work on the bridge began on 30 April 2025, following a virtual announcement by Mikhail Mishustin and Premier of North Korea, Pak Thae-song. Russian sources indicated that the target completion date was set for December 2026.

Speaking at the 2025 Eastern Economic Forum in September 2025, Russian President Vladimir Putin clarified that the bridge would be completed in 2026.

By October 2025, construction had progressed significantly, with a new aggregate plant, border checkpoint, access road and support piers progressing on the North Korean side. On the Russian side, support piers, access roads and a helipad were underway.

In early January 2026, Russian media reported that the bridge was expected to be complete by 19 June 2026.

By mid-March 2026, both Korean and Russian bridge spans were close to being connected, spanning the width of the Tumen River. Satellite imagery showed that progress on border infrastructure and connecting roads on both sides of the river had also progressed.

In April 2026, Russian transport minister Andrei Nikitin and his North Korean counterpart Cho Jong-ryong reported at the International Transport and Logistics Forum in Saint Petersburg that construction was proceeding according to schedule, with an expected opening in Summer 2026. On 21 April 2026, a ceremony marking the connection of both sides of the bridge was held.

By June 2026, significant progress had been made in the construction of buildings at the Russian customs area and by early August, satellite imagery showed the exterior nearing completion.

In late August 2026, Russian officials reported that the construction of border infrastructure continued to progress. Images of the bridge and border checkpoint facilities under construction were shared, showing several buildings in a state of near completion, as well as the now paved road deck. Satellite imagery confirmed this progress, showing paving works underway to connect the bridge to the existing highway in Khasan. It was further reported that the Sochi based contractor TonnelYuzhStroi was facing a lawsuit from Primorskaya Nerudnaya, a supplier of rock soil for the project. In September 2026, it was reported that costs had further increased, due to the procurement of checkpoint canopies for the Khasan border checkpoint.

Construction timeline

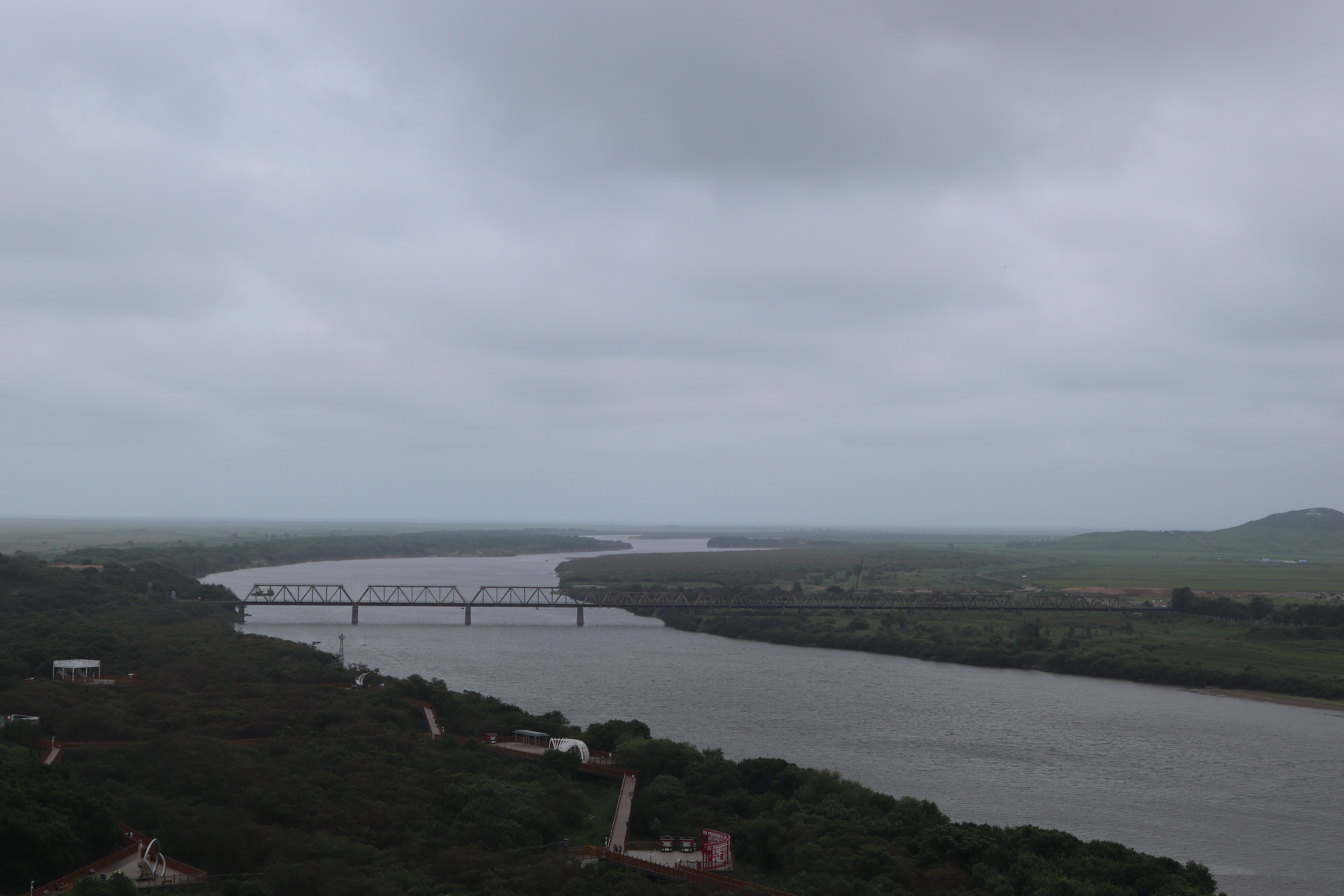
View of the bridge site from China, July 2025.

Bridge span over the Tumen River, January 2026

Golden Joint, April 2026

Completion of paving, June 2026

Opening ceremony, September 2026

== Opening ==
Opening ceremony for the Yakov Novichenko Bridge

On 7 September 2026, Russia and North Korea opened the bridge to vehicle traffic. The bridge was formally opened by the Sin Hong-chol (North Korean Ambassador to Russia), Alexander Kozlov (Minister of Natural Resources and Environment), Andrey Nikitin (Minister of Transport) and Aleksey Chekunkov (Minister for the Development of the Russian Far East and Arctic). The ceremony was attended remotely by Russian Prime Minister Mikhail Mishustin and Premier of North Korea Pak Thae Song. It was further reported that the bridge would bear the name of the Soviet military officer Yakov Novichenko, who protected Kim Il Sung, the first leader of North Korea, from an assassination attempt in 1946. An information board describing the construction of the bridge, as well as the life of its namesake was installed, describing Novichenko's role in participating in the Battles of Khalkhin Gol and the Manchurian Strategic Offensive Operation, as well as his postwar stationing in Pyongyang as part of the Soviet Civil Administration. A parade of vehicles crossed the bridge for the opening ceremony, led by a restored Zaporozhets that formerly belonged to Novichenko.

Mishustin stated that relations between Russia and North Korea were "at an unprecedented level", remarking that the opening of the bridge was a historic event. North Korean state media KNCA stated that the bridge was a sign of expanding economic cooperation between the two countries, which would benefit culture, tourism and trade in goods.

It was reported that construction of the Khasan checkpoint had been completed, but work on several ancillary buildings was still underway per satellite imagery. Cargo trucks could to use the bridge immediately, while passenger traffic would be allowed by the end of the year.

== See also ==
- List of international bridges
- Korea–Russia Friendship Bridge
- New Yalu River Bridge
