= North Korea–Russia border =

International border

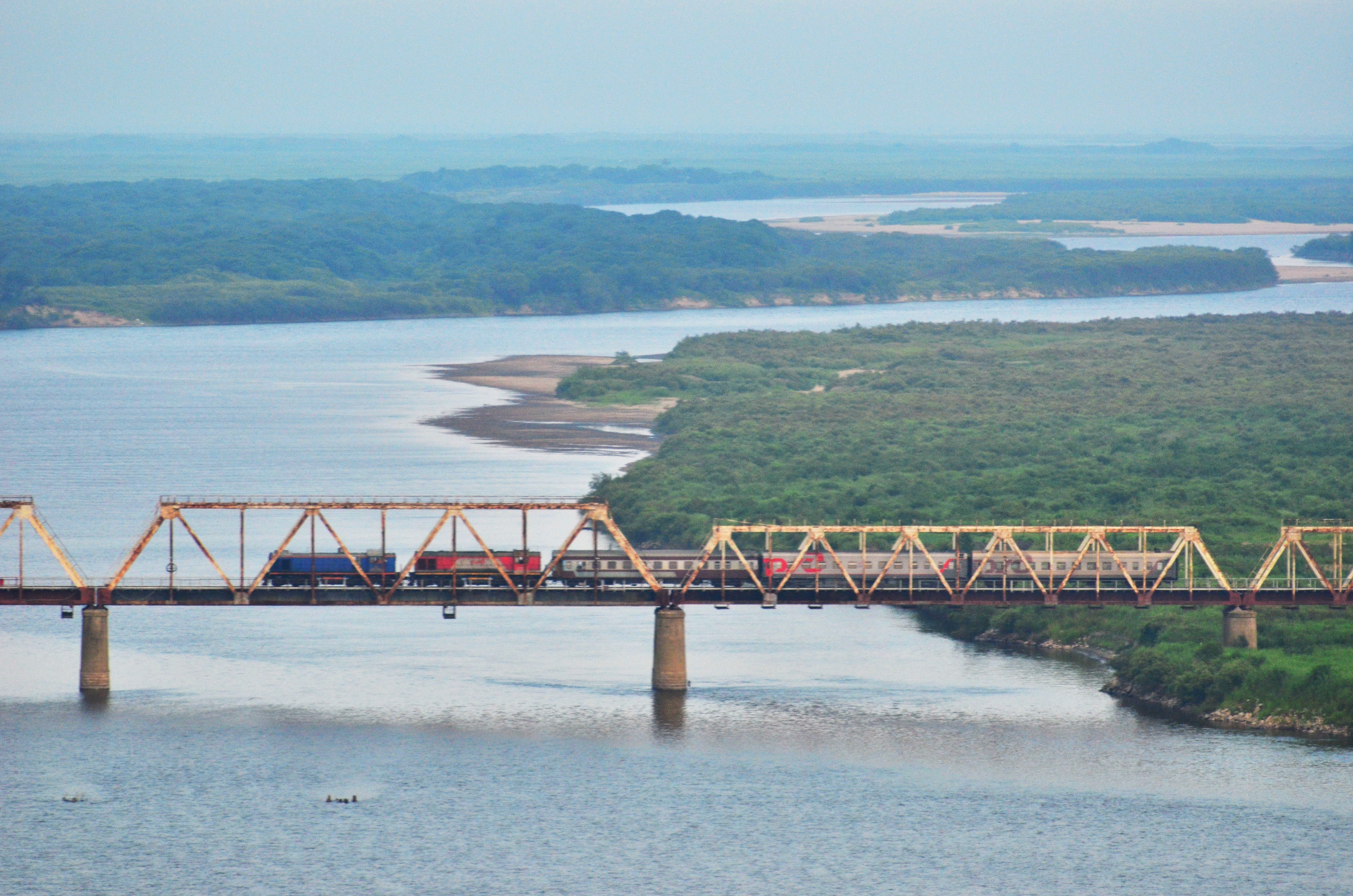
- The Friendship Bridge linking North Korea and Russia.

Characteristics
- Entities: North Korea; Russia
- Length: 39.1 km

History
- Established: 1860; Convention of Peking
- Current shape: 1985; USSR-DPRK border agreement
- Treaties: Treaty of Shimonoseki, Japan–Korea Treaty of 1905, Treaty of San Francisco

The North Korea–Russia border, according to the official Russian definition, consists of 17 kilometres (11 mi) of "terrestrial border" and 22.1 km (12 nautical miles) of "maritime border". It is the shortest of the international borders of Russia.

== Description ==
The terrestrial boundary between Russia and North Korea runs along the thalweg of the Tumen River and its estuary, while the maritime boundary separates the two countries' territorial waters in the Sea of Japan.

The principal border treaty was signed on April 17, 1985. A separate, trilateral treaty specifies the position of the China–North Korea–Russia tripoint. The North Korea–Russia and China–North Korea borders run along the middle of the Tumen River, while the China–Russia border approaches the junction point overland from the north. Because the theoretical tripoint is in the middle of the river, where it would be impractical to install a border monument, the agreement provides instead that the three countries install border monuments on the riverbank, and that the position of the tripoint be determined with respect to those monuments.

The administrative unit on the Russian side of the border is the Khasansky District of Primorsky Krai; on the Korean side, it is the city of Rason. The main Russian border guard station in the area is Peschanaya.

== History ==
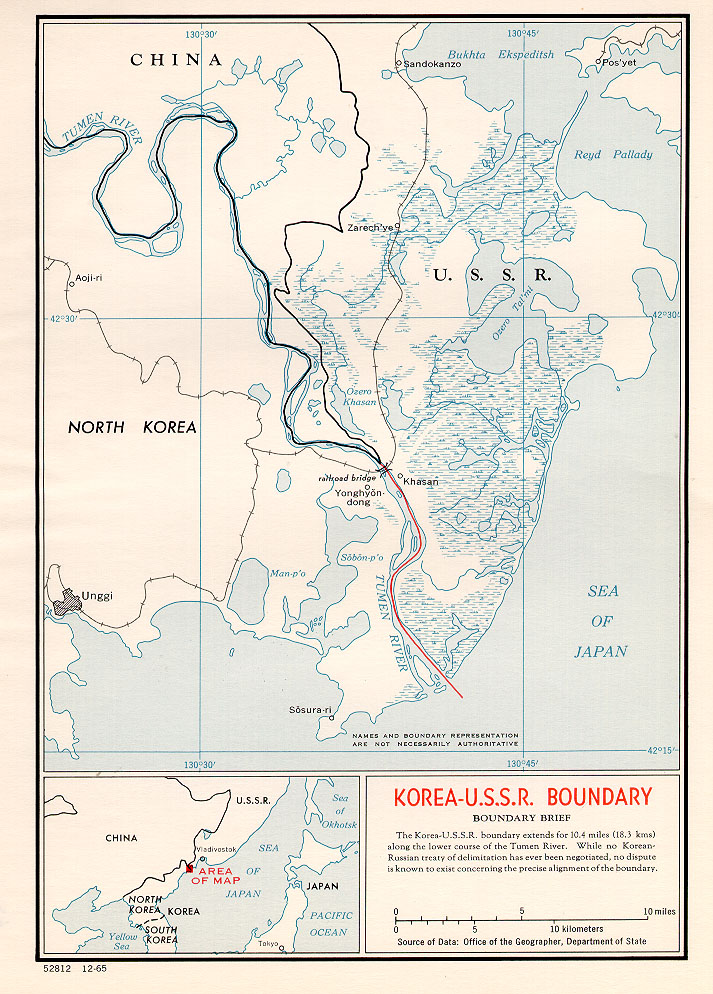
Map of the North Korea-USSR border, now the North Korea-Russia border.

The border between the Russian Empire and the Joseon, then a tributary state of the Qing dynasty, was established by the Convention of Peking in November 1860. Under the agreement, the Qing dynasty ceded territories east of the Ussuri River to the Russians. The original description of the border included the lower course of the Tumen River — the last 20 li (about 10.75–13 kilometres or 6.68–8.08 miles) — as its southernmost section, leaving the rest of the course of the river as a Korea-Russian boundary by default. A wooden pillar was then erected marking the tripoint, which was later replaced with a more permanent pillar in c. 1886.

According to the Institute of Qing History the ceding of territory which created the modern border between Russia and North Korea and blocks China's access to the Sea of Japan was caused as a result of mismanagement during the demarcation process: Article 1 of the 1860 Sino-Russian Peking Convention stipulates that the southeastern section of the Sino-Russian eastern border "...from the mouth of the Bailing River along the mountains to the mouth of the Hubutu River, and then from the mouth of the Hubutu River along the Hunchun River and the ridge between the sea to the mouth of the Tumen River, the east belongs to Russia; the west belongs to China." In 1861, Chinese and Russian representatives signed the "Sino-Russian Eastern Boundary Agreement: (Chinese: 中俄勘分東界約記), in which the border between the two countries is on the east bank of the Tumen River estuary and the Sea of Japan. The coast from the north-eastern bank of the lower reaches of the Tumen River to the coast of the Sea of Japan still belongs to China, where China separates Russia and Korea through the 3km wide Japanese coast. However, the "Border Map from the Ussuri River to the Sea" (Chinese: 烏蘇里江至海交界記文) document handed to China by Russia in 1862 shows that the border between the two countries is 20km north of the Tumen River estuary. This omission was allegedly caused by the director of the Ministry of Revenue Cheng Qi, who was serving as the special Chinese envoy for Sino-Russian border survey in 1861. Cheng Qi was addicted to opium and went to nearby Jilin City to replenish his drug stash, and entrusted the establishment of the border markers entirely to the Russian survey representatives. The Russian side took the opportunity to unilaterally draw a boundary map, thereby connecting Russia and the Korean Peninsula across the Tumen River, gaining a foothold for invading Korea, and blocking China's passage to the Sea of Japan through the Tumen River. Cheng Qi was shortly fired from all official posts after the incident.

The existence of Korea as a separate country was not mentioned in the 1860 convention between Russia and China, but in the late 19th and early 20th centuries, Chinese influence in Korea waned and Japanese influence grew. The Treaty of Shimonoseki in 1895 ended the tributary relationship with Korea, and the Japan–Korea Treaty of 1905 made Korea a protectorate of Japan. The Japan–Korea Treaty of 1910 finalised Japan's annexation of Korea. Thus, the Tumen River became a border between the Russian Empire (later, the Soviet Union) and the Japanese Empire; this continued until the end of Japanese rule in Korea in 1945.

In 1985, the Soviet Union and North Korea signed an agreement establishing a border along the middle of the Tumen. The former Noktundo Island, 32 square kilometres (12 sq mi) in size, was recognized by North Korea as part of Russia. This agreement was not accepted by South Korea, which continues to view Noktundo as Korean territory.

In the second half of the 20th century, thousands of North Korean refugees and displaced people crossed the border. Their descendants now live throughout Russia and other Commonwealth of Independent States countries.

== Border crossing ==
There are two crossings on the North Korea–Russia border: the first is Friendship Bridge over the Tumen River, 800 metres (2,600 ft) southwest of the railway station in Khasan, Russia. On the North Korean side, the border railway station is at Tumangang. The crossing is railway-only, used by freight and passenger trains, but planks laid between the tracks make crossing of road vehicles possible by special arrangement.It was commissioned in 1959 as a replacement for a temporary wooden bridge.

Passenger train service over the Friendship Bridge includes a Khasan–Tumangang shuttle, as well as a Korean State Railway direct car on the Moscow–Pyongyang route. The direct car travels from Moscow to Ussuriysk with a Moscow–Vladivostok train, to Khasan with an Ussuriysk–Khasan train, across the border with the Khasan–Tumangang shuttle train, and then to Pyongyang with a domestic Korean train. At 10,272 km (6,383 mi) total, this is the longest direct (one-seat ride) passenger rail service in the world.

Normally, the crossing is used only by citizens of Russia and North Korea, and is not open to nationals of other countries. In 2008, however, two Western tourists managed to enter North Korea from Russia by taking a train over the Friendship Bridge. In 2019, a Western-run travel agency specializing in North Korea tourism announced a Moscow–Pyongyang train tour that would also use the Khasan–Tumangang border crossing.

In April 2015, the deputy transport ministers of Russia and North Korea—Nikolai Asaul and Kwok Il-ryong, respectively—signed an agreement to develop a road connection between the two countries. The bridge opened in September 2026, under the name Yakov Novichenko Bridge.

== Riverbank protection ==
Because the North Korean side of the river is mountainous and the Russian side is lower, shore erosion may cause the Tumen River, which floods annually, to gradually change its course toward the Russian side. (A similar phenomenon is seen on the China–Russia border, with the Amur River). To prevent the loss of national territory, and to shield Khasan and the Peschanaya border guard station from flooding, Russian authorities carried out a riverbank protection project using rock fill from 2004 to 2008.

== Incidents ==
On 16 October 2016, a Russian border guard killed a North Korean fisherman and injured eight others after opening fire on a fishing vessel in the Sea of Japan. The Federal Security Service (FSB) claimed the vessel, trawler Dae Yong No. 10, was encroaching in Russian waters in the Sea of Japan on Saturday. During a search of the vessel, the FSB guards found "illegally obtained aquatic bio-resources" on board, a statement said. The statement says the ship then attempted to flee while its crewmembers tried to wrest weapons from the Russian guards. A Russian coast guard ship fired at the trawler's propulsion system, disabling it, and on the North Korean crewmen, the statement said.

On 17 September 2019, the FSB said a Russian Coast Guard ship detected two North Korean vessels and 11 motorboats fishing illegally in Russian territorial waters. While one of the vessels was detained, the crew of the other opened fire, wounding four Russian servicemen before it was captured, along with the 11 motorboats, according to the FSB. A total of 161 North Koreans were detained, including some wounded in the confrontation, who were given medical assistance. Both North Korean vessels, their crews, and 11 motorboats were taken to the Russian port of Nakhodka, where they were expected to stay until the end of the investigation.

On 18 September 2019, Russia summoned the top North Korean diplomat in the country over a skirmish between the coast guard and fishing vessels in the Sea of Japan. Russia's Foreign Ministry expressed "serious concern" over the incident to Jin Jong-hyeop, the interim chargé d'affaires at the North Korean Embassy in Moscow. This was not the first time the countries have had run-ins in the region. North Korea had previously seized Russian boats - arresting a fishing crew in July 2019.

== Gallery ==
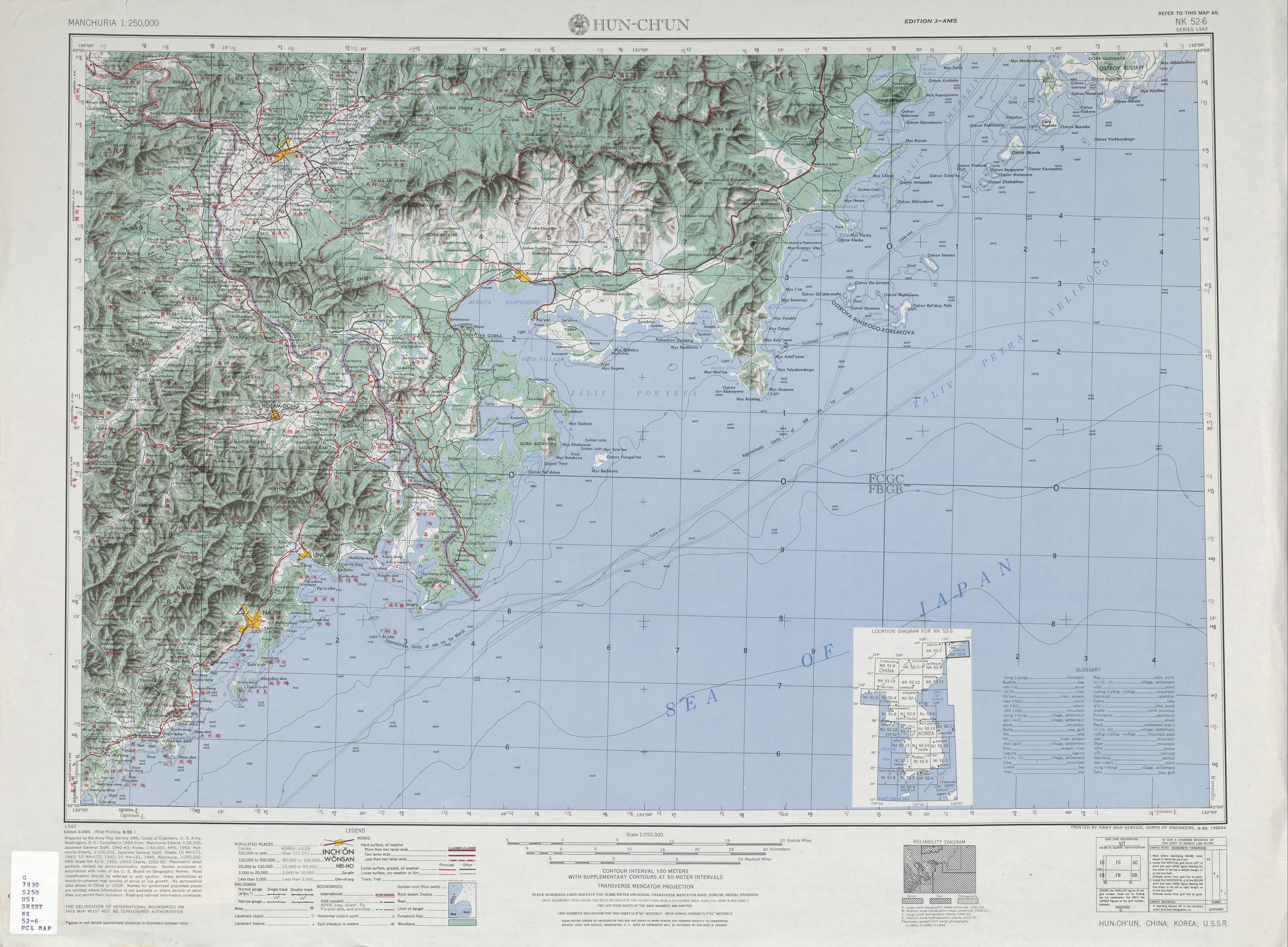
Map including the DPRK–USSR border (1954)

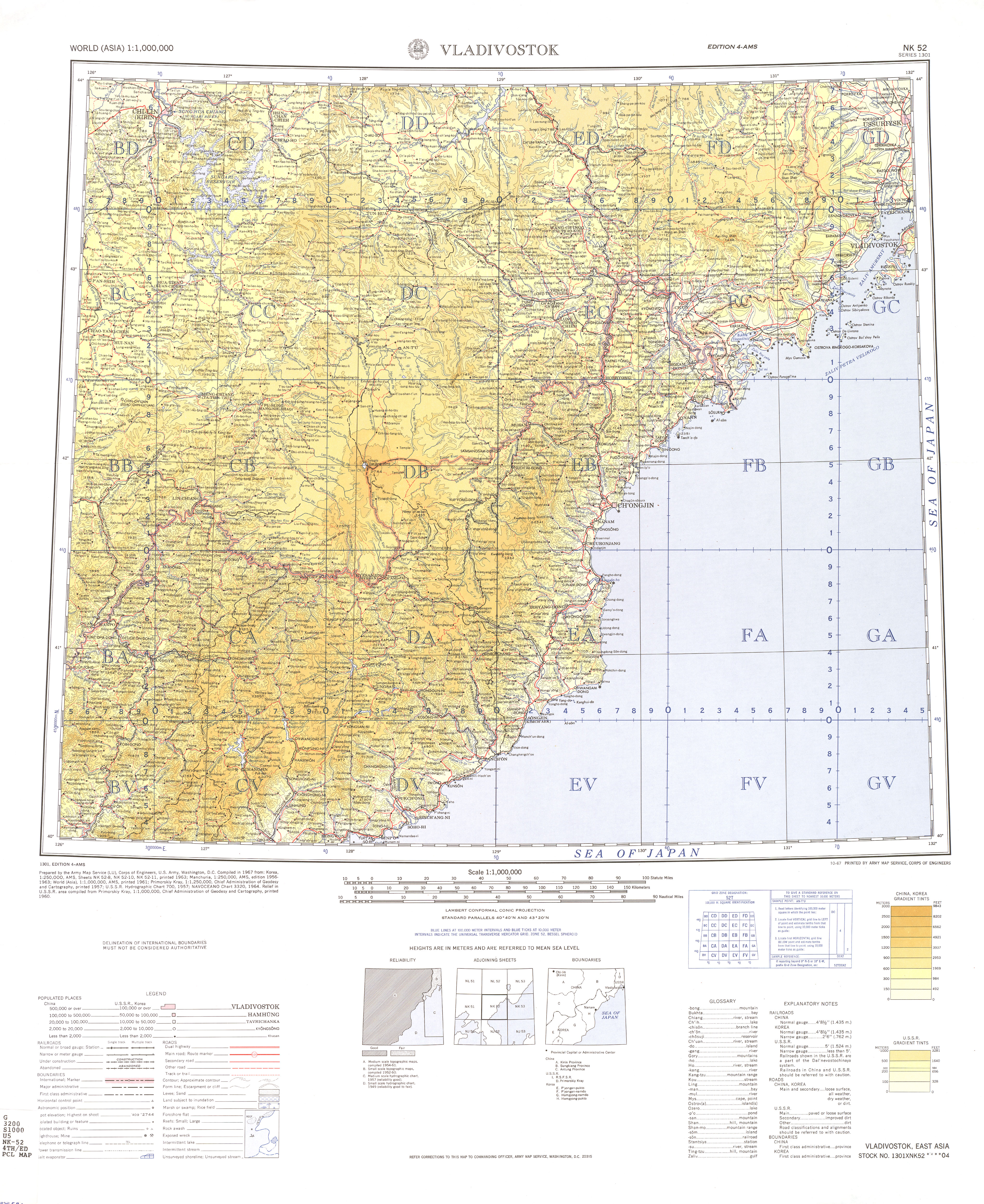
Map including the DPRK–USSR border from the International Map of the World (1967)

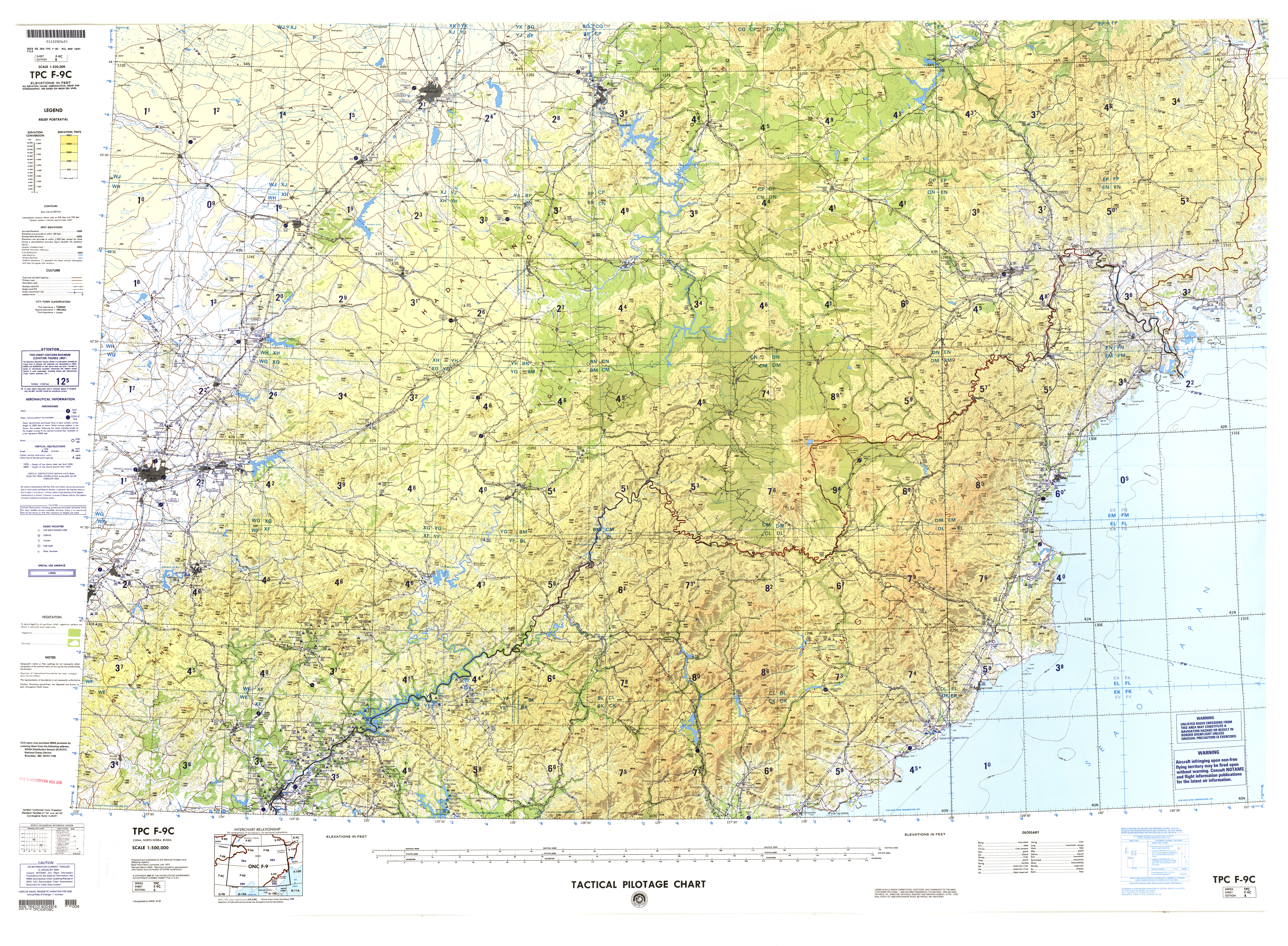
Map including the North Korea–Russia border
