= Tumen River =

River in China, North Korea, and Russia

Tumen River 图们江 Duman River (두만강; 豆滿江) or Tuman River
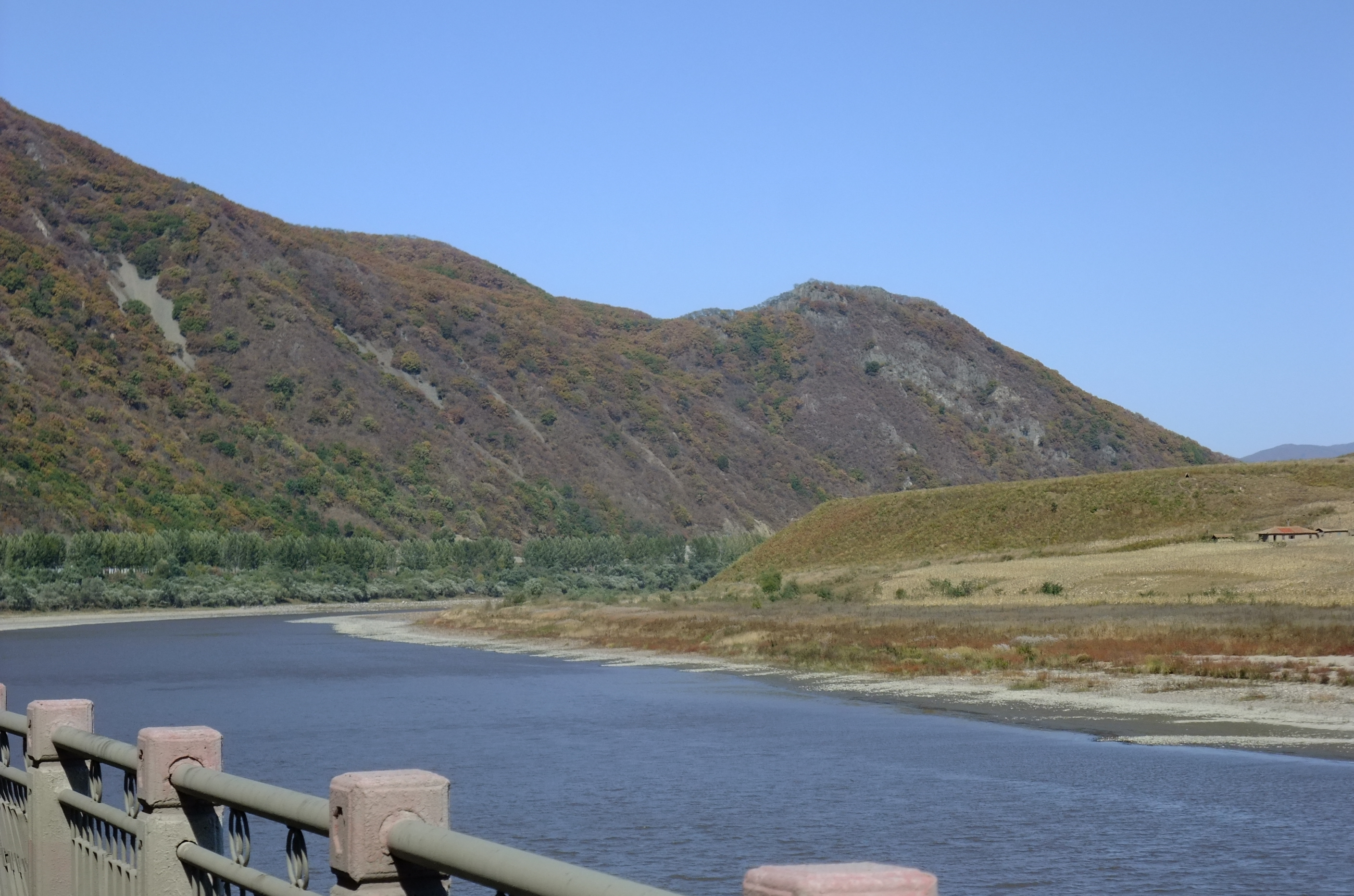
- Tumem River near Tumen City, China

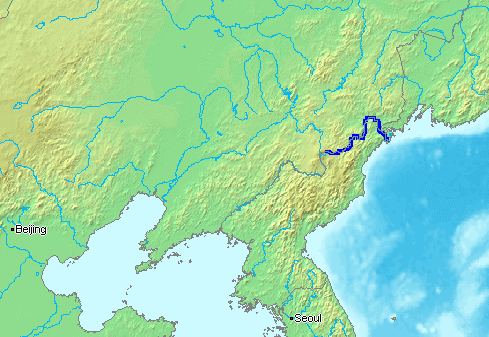
- Location of the Tumen River
- Etymology: Old Turkic and Mongolian, tümen "ten thousand"
- Native name: 图们江 (Chinese)

Location
- Country: North Korea (DPRK), China (PRC), Russia
- Province (DPRK): North Hamgyong, Ryanggang
- Province (PRC): Jilin
- Federal subject (Russia): Primorsky Krai

Physical characteristics
- Source: Paektu Mountain
- Mouth: Sea of Japan
  - location: Sea of Japan, Russia, North Korea
  - coordinates: 42°17′34″N 130°41′56″E
  - elevation: 0 m (0 ft)
- Length: 521 km (324 mi)
- Basin size: 33,800 km^{2} (13,100 sq mi)

Basin features
- Tributaries
  - left: Gaya River; Hunchun River

Tumen River

Chinese name
- Traditional Chinese: 圖們江
- Simplified Chinese: 图们江
Transcriptions
Standard Mandarin
- Hanyu Pinyin: Túmén Jiāng
- Wade–Giles: Tʻu²-mên² Chiang¹

Korean name
- Chosŏn'gŭl: 두만강
- Hancha: 豆滿江
Transcriptions
- Revised Romanization: Dumangang
- McCune–Reischauer: Tuman'gang

Chinese Korean name
- Chosŏn'gŭl: 도문강
- Hancha: 圖們江
Transcriptions
- Revised Romanization: Domungang
- McCune–Reischauer: Tomun'gang

Mongolian name
- Mongolian Cyrillic: Түмэн гол
Transcriptions
- SASM/GNC: Tümen gol

Manchu name
- Manchu script: ᡨᡠᠮᡝᠨ ᡠᠯᠠ
- Romanization: Tumen ula

Russian name
- Russian: Туманная река
- Romanization: Tumannaya reka

The Tumen River (Chinese: 图们江; pinyin: Túmén Jiāng, Russian: река Туманная, Korean: 두만강; Korean pronunciation: [tuman.gaŋ]), also known as the Tuman River or Duman River, (Note: In the 19th century, the river was also known to the West as the Mi Kiang.) is a 521-kilometre (324 mi) long river that serves as part of the boundary between China (left shore), North Korea (right) and Russia (left), rising on the slopes of Mount Paektu and flowing into the Sea of Japan. The river has a drainage basin of 33,800 km^{2} (13,100 sq mi).

The river flows in northeast Asia, on the border between China and North Korea in its upper reaches, and between North Korea and Russia in its last 17 kilometers (11 mi) before entering the Sea of Japan. The river forms much of the southern border of Jilin Province in Northeast China and the northern borders of North Korea's North Hamgyong and Ryanggang provinces. Paektu Mountain on the Chinese-North Korean border is the source of the river, as well as of the Yalu River. The two rivers and the region of Paektu Mountain between their headwaters form the border between North Korea and China.

The name of the river comes from the Mongolian word tümen, meaning "ten thousand" or a myriad. In Tumen, Jilin, a riverfront promenade has restaurants where patrons can gaze across the river into North Korea. The Russian name of the river is Tumannaya, literally meaning foggy.

In 1938 the Japanese built the Tumen River Bridge, where the Quan River meets the Tumen River, between the villages of Wonjong (Hunchun) and Quanhe. Important cities and towns on the river are Hoeryong and Onsong in North Korea, Tumen and Nanping (南坪镇, in the county-level city of Helong) in China's Jilin province.

In 1995, the People's Republic of China, Mongolia, Russia, North Korea and South Korea signed three agreements to create the Tumen River Economic Development Area.

== Noktundo ==
Noktundo, a former island (now effectively a peninsula) at the mouth of the Tumen, has been a boundary contention between Russia and North Korea. The Qing dynasty ceded the island to Russia as part of the Primorsky Maritimes (East Tartary) in the 1860 Treaty of Peking. In 1990, the then Soviet Union and North Korea signed a border treaty which made the border run through the center of the river, leaving territory of the former island on Russian side. South Korea refuses to acknowledge the treaty and demanded that Russia return the territory to Korea.

== Fishing ==
There are several popular species of fish endemic to Tumen river, such as Tumen lenok and bighead gudgeon. In 2016, China released 800,000 salmon seedlings into Tumen river in order to expand the regional fishing industry and meet the increasing demand for sea products.

== Illegal crossings ==
The Tumen has been crossed for years by North Korean refugees defecting across the Chinese border. Most refugees from North Korea during the 1990s famine crossed it, and most recent refugees have also used it, as it is far easier than crossing the Amnok River. The Tumen is the preferred crossing because, unlike the swift, deep and broad Amnok River that runs along most of the border between the two countries, the Tumen is shallow and narrow. In some areas it can be crossed on foot, or by short swims. It freezes in winter, allowing dry crossings. Defectors wishing to cross the Tumen often ignore its pollutants and dangerous border patrol, and spend weeks if not months or years waiting for the perfect opportunity to cross. "Long, desolate stretches of the Chinese-North Korean border are not patrolled at all", according to a New York Times article.

Refugees rarely cross the Tumen into Russia. This is because Russia's short stretch of the river is far better patrolled than China's stretch. In addition, the rewards for doing so are not as high since the ethnic Korean community in Russia is far smaller to receive sufficient support from, as opposed to China, which has a larger Korean population. Lastly, North Korean authorities have been known to infiltrate Russia looking for defectors and those who collaborate to assist them; the 1996 murder of Choe Deok-geun in the border city of Vladivostok prompted South Korean authorities to be very reluctant to provide defectors with any assistance.

The Tumen is also crossed illegally by soldiers and others seeking food and money. Some Chinese villagers have left the border area because of the attacks.

The history of conflict in the area (examples include incidents during the Battle of Lake Khasan) was alluded to in singer Kim Jeong-gu's song 'Tearful Tumen River (눈물 젖은 두만강)', which became an ode to families separated by such tragedies and by defections during the Korean War. The humanitarian crisis along the Tumen River was dramatized in the 2010 feature-length film Dooman River.

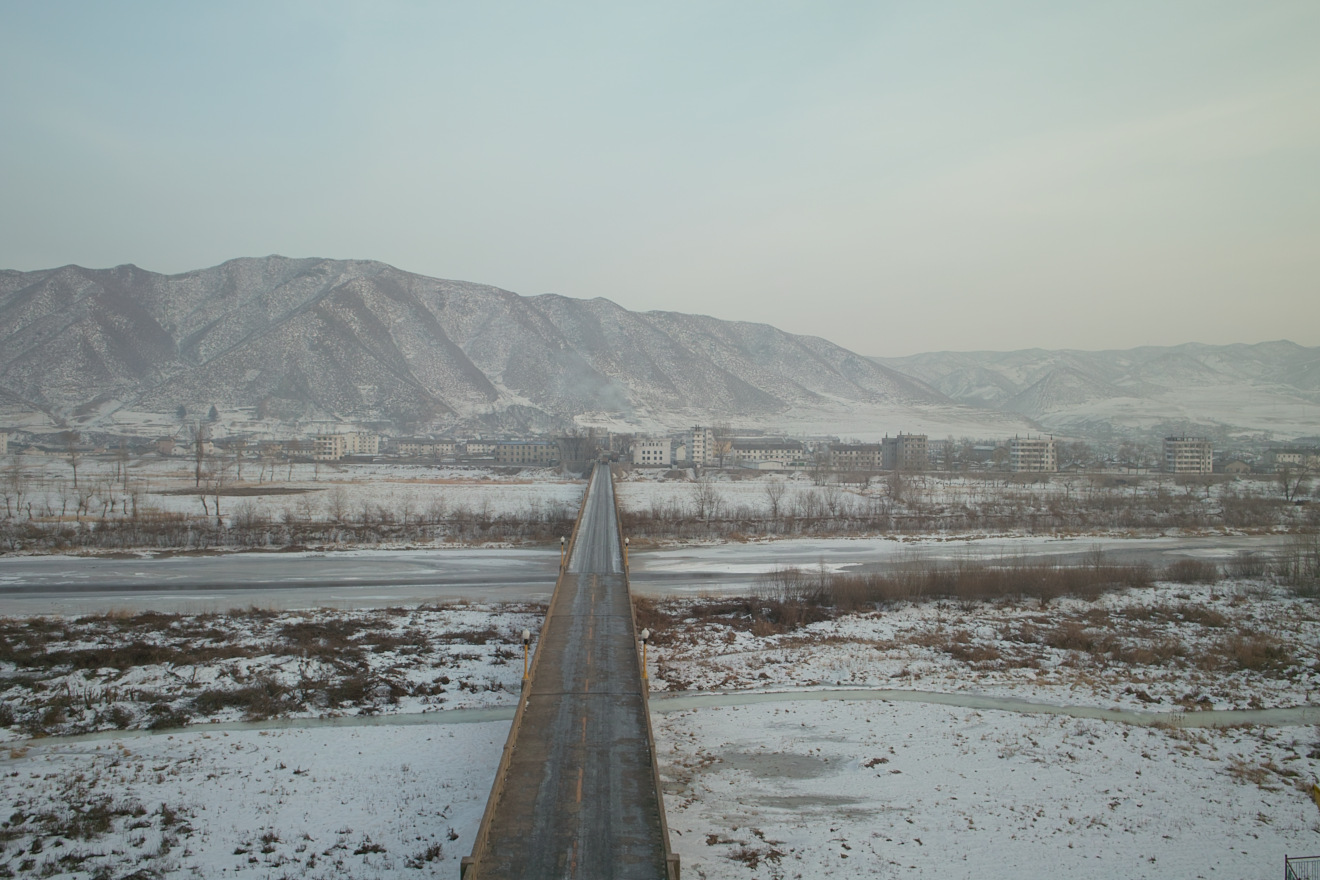
Bridge of Tumen River, built in 1941

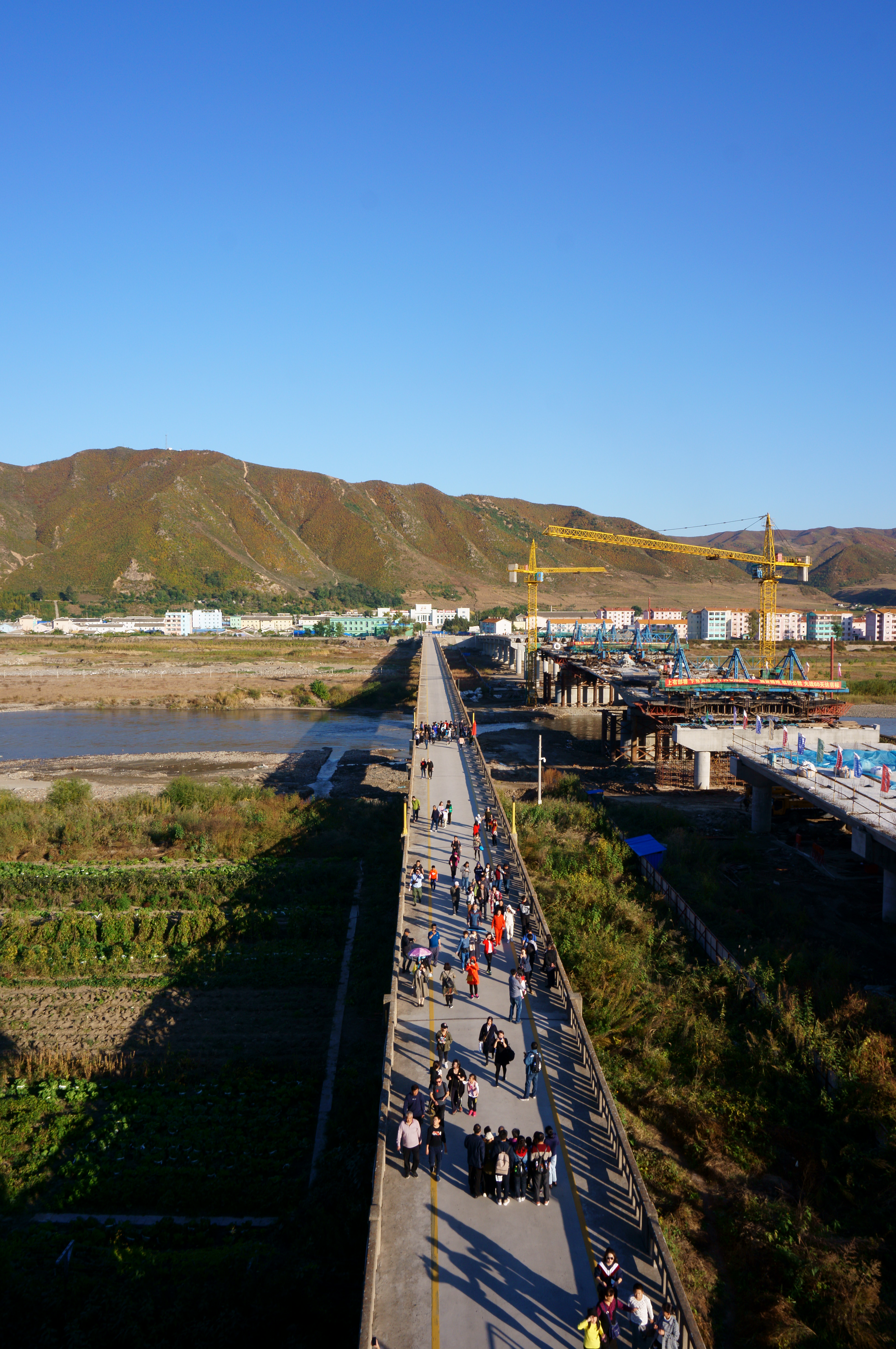
Bridge of Tumen River, shot in 2018

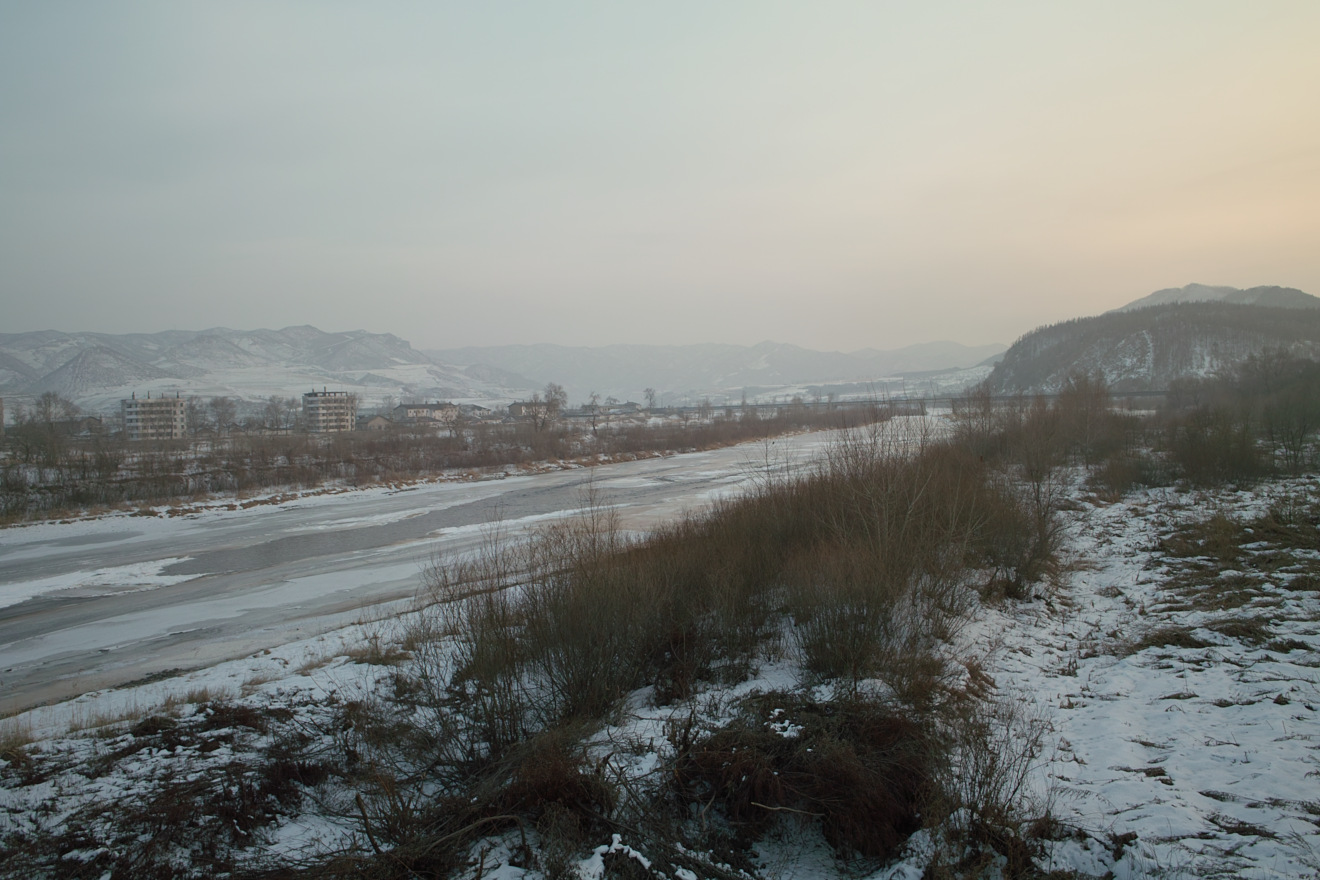
North Korea is on the other side of the Tumen River

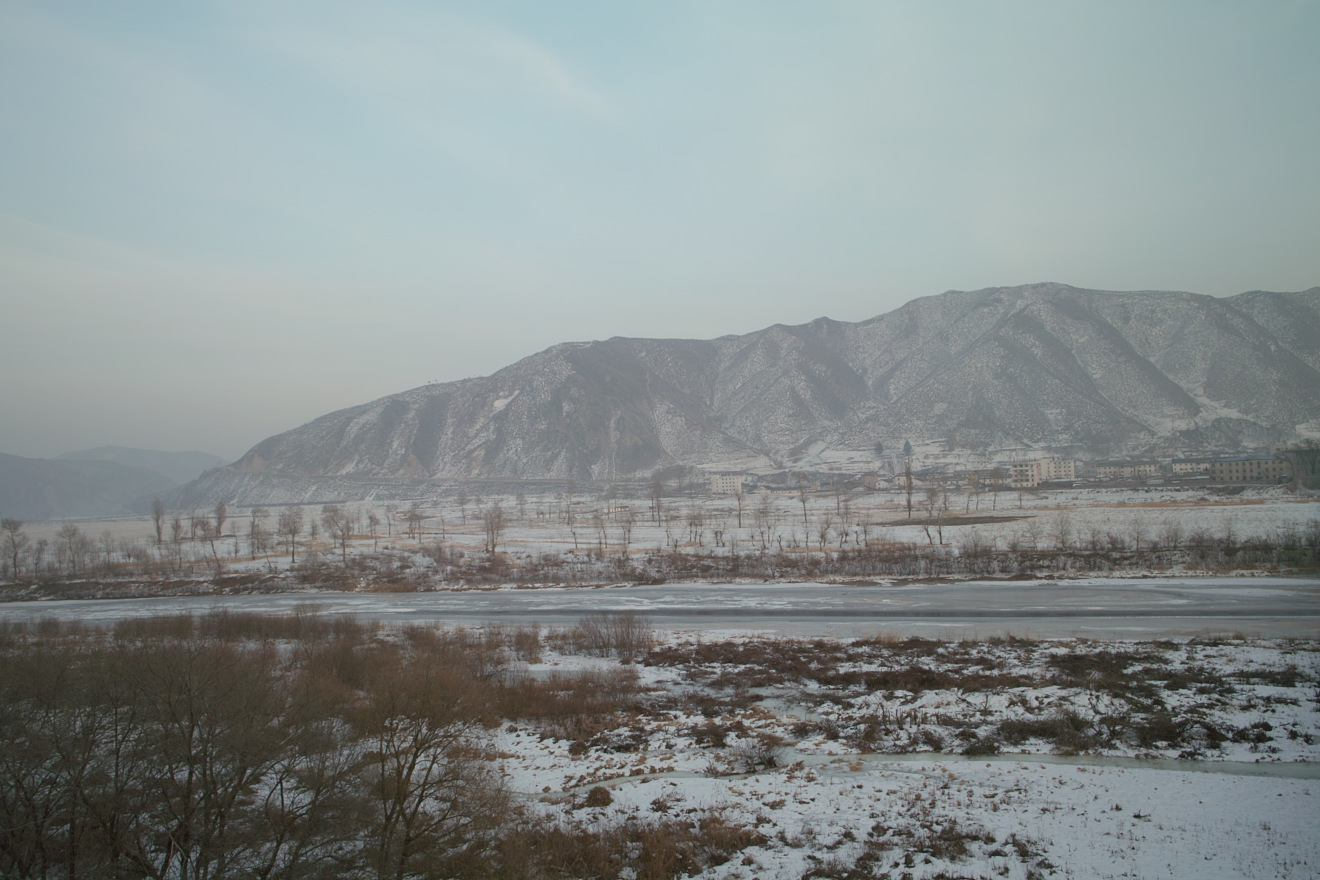
View across the river from Tumen city in China to the town of Namyang in North Korea

== Recent developments ==
In May 2026, Chinese leader Xi Jinping and Russian President Vladimir Putin issued a joint statement invoking a 1991 trilateral border agreement as the basis for consultations aimed at advancing Chinese commercial navigation along the river's final stretch. According to analysis by Seong Hyeon Choi, published in Eagle Intelligence Reports, the topic was notably absent from Xi's June 2026 visit to Pyongyang, which the analysis interprets as evidence that North Korea retains effective veto power over opening the river to Chinese navigation, despite closer China–Russia alignment.

In September 2026, Yakov Novichenko Bridge, the first road bridge connecting Russia and North Korea, was opened over the Tumen River between Rason and Khasan.
