= Chongam-guyok =

Ch'ŏngam 청암
- District
- 청암구역

Korean transcription(s)
  - Hancha: 青岩區域
  - McCune–Reischauer: Ch'ŏngam-guyŏk
  - Revised Romanization: Cheongam-guyeok
- Interactive map of Ch'ŏngam
- Coordinates: 42°01′17″N 129°54′20″E
- Country: North Korea
- Region: Kwanbuk
- Province: North Hamgyong
- City: Chongjin
- Administrative divisions: 21 tong, 6 ri

Population (2008)
  - Total: 136,659

Ch'ŏngam-guyŏk is a district of the 7 kuyŏk that constitute Chongjin, North Hamgyong Province, North Korea.

The Chongam Revolutionary Site in Haebang-dong is associated with Kim Jong-suk. She met there with fellow guerilla fighters in November 1945 to further Kim Il Sung's political agenda.

== Administrative divisions ==
Chongam-guyok is divided into 21 neighbourhoods (tong) and 6 villages (ri).

	Chosŏn'gŭl	Hancha
Ragyang-dong	락양동	洛陽洞
Yokchon-dong	역전동	驛前洞
Haebang-dong	해방동	解放洞
Chongsan-dong	정산동	靜山洞
Ingok-tong	인곡1동	仁谷一洞
Ingok-tong	인곡2동	仁谷二洞
Munhwa-dong	문화1동	文化一洞
Munhwa-dong	문화2동	文化二洞
Kumbawi-dong	금바위동	
Chongam-dong	청암1동	靑岩一洞
Chongam-dong	청암2동	靑岩二洞
Ryonjin-dong	련진동	連津洞
Majon-dong	마전동	麻田洞
Ryongje-dong	룡제동	龍濟洞
Pangjin-dong	방진동	方津洞
Rijin-dong	리진동	梨津洞
Kwanhae-dong	관해동	觀海洞
Rasok-tong	라석동	羅石洞
Samhae-dong	삼해동	三海洞
Rochang-dong	로창동	蘆倉洞
Raksan-dong	락산동	洛山洞
Chikha-ri	직하리	稷下里
Ryonchol-li	련천리	連川里
Pugo-ri	부거리	富巨里
Sagu-ri	사구리	沙口里
Kyowol-li	교원리	橋院里
So-ri	서리	西里
