= Puyun-guyok =

Puyun 부윤
- District
- 부윤구역 · Puyun District

Korean transcription(s)
  - Hancha: 富潤區域
  - McCune–Reischauer: Puyun-guyŏk
  - Revised Romanization: Buyun-guyeok
- Interactive map of Puyun
- Country: North Korea
- Region: Kwanbuk
- Province: North Hamgyong
- City: Chongjin
- Administrative divisions: 7 tong, 1 ri

Population (2008)
  - Total: 20,258

Puyun-guyŏk is a district of the 7 kuyŏk that constitute Chongjin, North Hamgyong Province, North Korea.

== Administrative divisions ==
Puyun-guyok is divided into 7 neighbourhoods (tong) and one village (ri).

	Chosŏn'gŭl	Hancha
Puyun-dong	부윤1동	富潤洞
Puyun-dong	부윤2동	富潤洞
Chonsu-dong	천수동	千水洞
Kosong-dong	고성1동	古城洞
Kosong-dong	고성2동	古城洞
Sonbawi-dong	선바위동	
Ayang-dong	아양동	阿陽洞
Oyu-ri	어유리	漁游里
