= Pohang-guyok =

Coordinates: 41°47′56″N 129°46′51″E

P'ohang 포항
- District
- 포항구역 · Pohang District

Korean transcription(s)
  - Hancha: 浦港區域
  - McCune–Reischauer: P'ohang-guyŏk
  - Revised Romanization: Pohang-guyeok
- Interactive map of P'ohang
- Country: North Korea
- Region: Kwanbuk
- Province: North Hamgyong
- City: Chongjin
- Administrative divisions: 14 tong

Population (2008)
  - Total: 104,007

P'ohang-guyŏk is one of the seven kuyŏk (wards) that constitute Chongjin, North Hamgyong Province, North Korea.

== Administrative divisions ==
Pohang-guyok is divided into 14 neighbourhoods (tong).

	Chosŏn'gŭl	Hancha
Namgang-dong	남강1동	南江洞
Namgang-dong	남강2동	南江洞
Namgang-dong	남강3동	南江洞
Chongsong-dong	청송1동	靑松洞
Chongsong-dong	청송2동	靑松洞
Chongsong-dong	청송3동	靑松洞
Suwon-dong	수원1동	水源洞
Suwon-dong	수원2동	水源洞
Subuk-tong	수북1동	水北洞
Subuk-tong	수북2동	水北洞
Subuk-tong	수북3동	水北洞
Namhyang-dong	남향동	南鄕洞
Pukhyang-dong	북향동	北鄕洞
Sanop-tong	산업동	産業洞
