= Sunam-guyok =

Sunam 수남
- District
- 수남구역 · Sunam District

Korean transcription(s)
  - Hancha: 水南區域
  - McCune–Reischauer: Sunam-guyŏk
  - Revised Romanization: Sunam-guyeok
- Interactive map of Sunam
- Country: North Korea
- Region: Kwanbuk
- Province: North Hamgyong
- City: Chongjin
- Administrative divisions: 9 tong

Population (2008)
  - Total: 82,765

Sunam-guyŏk is a district of the 7 kuyŏk that constitute Chongjin, North Hamgyong Province, North Korea.The Susong plains is located in this district.

== Administrative divisions ==
Sunam-guyok is divided into 9 neighbourhoods (tong).

| | Chosŏn'gŭl | Hancha | Notes |
|---|---|---|---|
| Sinhyang-dong | 신향동 | 新鄕洞 | Created from Sunam dong right after liberation of korea.Was named as such because it is a new town. |
| Ohang-dong | 어항동 | 漁港洞 | It was named as such for its harbor with fishing boats.The susongchon river is located here. |
| Marum-dong | 말음1동 | 末陰洞 | Originally part of Chonghamyeon. It was abolished in 1914 as it became part of Sunamdong under Chongammyon. Recreated from Sunam dong in 1963. |
| Marum-dong | 말음2동 | 末陰洞 | Originally part of Chonghamyeon. It was abolished in 1914 as it became part of Sunamdong under Chongammyon. Recreated from Sunam dong in 1963. |
| Sunam-dong | 수남1동 | 水南洞 | |
| Sunam-dong | 수남2동 | 水南洞 | |
| Chongnam-dong | 청남동 | 靑南洞 | |
| Chumok-tong | 추목동 | 楸木洞 | Created from part of the area of Chupyong-dong. |
| Chupyong-dong | 추평동 | 楸坪洞 | Created from Sunam dong.The place was named as such for its Tiger nuts. |
