= Songpyong-guyok =

Songp'yŏng 송평
- District
- 송평구역 · Songp'yŏng District

Korean transcription(s)
  - Hancha: 松坪區域
  - McCune–Reischauer: Songp'yŏng-guyŏk
  - Revised Romanization: Songpyeong-guyeok
- Interactive map of Songp'yŏng
- Country: North Korea
- Region: Kwanbuk
- Province: North Hamgyong
- City: Chongjin
- Administrative divisions: 13 tong, 5 ri

Population (2008)
  - Total: 146,973

Songp'yŏng-guyŏk is a district of the 7 kuyŏk that constitute Chongjin, North Hamgyong Province, North Korea.

== Administrative divisions ==
Songpyong-guyok is divided into 13 neighbourhoods (tong) and 5 villages (ri).

	Chosŏn'gŭl	Hancha
Sŏngp'yŏng-dong	송평동	松坪洞
Sŏhang 1-dong	서항1동	西港1洞
Sŏhang 2-dong	서항2동	西港2洞
Songhyang-dong	송향동	松鄕洞
Chech'ŏl-dong	제철동	製鐵洞
Namp'o-dong	남포동	南浦洞
Sabong-dong	사봉동	沙峯洞
Songrim-dong	송림동	松林洞
Ŭnjong 1-dong	은정1동	恩情1洞
Ŭnjong 2-dong	은정2동	恩情2洞
Susŏng-dong	수성동	輸城洞
Kangdŏk 1-dong	강덕1동	康德1洞
Kangdŏk 2-dong	강덕2동	康德2洞
Songgong-ri	송곡리	松谷里
Ryongho-ri	룡호리	龍湖里
Wŏlp'o-ri	월포리	月浦里
Namsŏng-ri	남석리	南夕里
Kundong-ri	근동리	芹洞里
