= Sinam-guyok =

Sinam 신암
- District
- 신암구역 · Sinam District

Korean transcription(s)
  - Hancha: 新岩區域
  - McCune–Reischauer: Sinam-guyŏk
  - Revised Romanization: Sinam-guyeok
- Location within North Korea
- Country: North Korea
- Region: Kwanbuk
- Province: North Hamgyong
- City: Chongjin
- Administrative divisions: 10 tong

Population (2008)
  - Total: 64,924

Sinam-guyŏk is a district of the 7 kuyŏk that constitute Chongjin, North Hamgyong Province, North Korea.

== Administrative divisions ==
Sinam-guyok is divided into 10 neighbourhoods (tong).

	Chosŏn'gŭl	Hancha
Haean-dong	해안동	海岸洞
Sinam-dong	신암동	新岩洞
Chonma-dong	천마동	天摩洞
Sohung-dong	서흥동	西興洞
Kwanhae-dong	관해동	觀海洞
Pohang-dong	포항동	浦項洞
Kunhwa-dong	근화동	槿花洞
Kyo-dong	교동	校洞
Sinjin-dong	신진동	新津洞
Unhye-dong	은혜동	恩惠洞
