= Ranam-guyok =

Ranam 라남
- District
- 라남구역 · Ranam District

Korean transcription(s)
  - Hancha: 羅南區域
  - McCune–Reischauer: Ranam-guyŏk
  - Revised Romanization: Nanam-guyeok
- Interactive map of Ranam
- Country: North Korea
- Region: Kwanbuk
- Province: North Hamgyong
- City: Chongjin
- Administrative divisions: 19 tong, 2 ri

Population (2008)
  - Total: 112,343

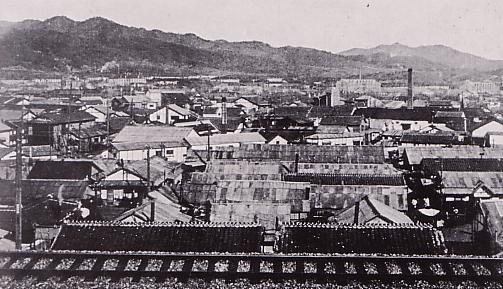
View of Ranan

Ranam-guyŏk is a district of the 7 kuyŏk that constitute Chongjin, North Hamgyong Province, North Korea.

== Administrative divisions ==
Ranam-guyok is divided into 19 neighbourhoods (tong) and 2 villages (ri).

	Chosŏn'gŭl	Hancha
Rahung-dong	라흥1동	羅興洞
Rahung-dong	라흥2동	羅興洞
Punggok-tong	풍곡동	豊谷洞
Rigok-tong	리곡동	梨谷洞
Pyonghwa-dong	평화동	平和洞
Rasong-dong	라성동	羅城洞
Sinhung-dong	신흥동	新興洞
Hoehyang-dong	회향동	檜鄕洞
Rabuk-tong	라북1동	羅北洞
Rabuk-tong	라북2동	羅北洞
Ragwon-dong	락원1동	樂園洞
Ragwon-dong	락원2동	樂園洞
Saegori-dong	새거리동	
Bongchon-dong	봉천1동	鳳泉洞
Bongchon-dong	봉천2동	鳳泉洞
Bongchon-dong	봉천3동	鳳泉洞
Undok-tong	은덕동	恩德洞
Puam-dong	부암동	富岩洞
Ryongchon-dong	룡천동	龍川洞
Ryongam-ni	룡암리	龍岩里
Pongam-ni	봉암리	鳳岩里
