= Kim Chaek =

North Korean general and politician (1903–1951)

- 김책
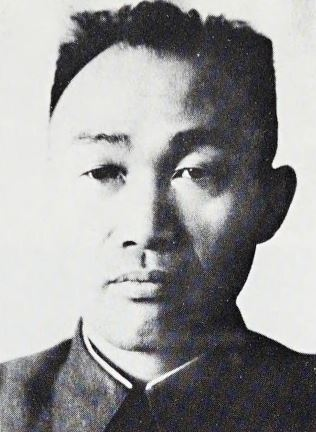
- Official photograph of Kim Chaek used by the North Korean government

Vice Premier of the Cabinet
- In office 9 September 1948 – 31 January 1951 Serving with Pak Hon-yong, Hong Myong-hui and Ho Ka-i.
- Premier: Kim Il Sung

Minister of Industry
- In office 9 September 1948 – 31 January 1951
- Premier: Kim Il Sung
- Preceded by: Position established
- Succeeded by: Chong Il-yong

Personal details
- Born: Kim Hong-gye; 14 August 1903 Sŏngjin, Haksong County, North Hamgyong Province, Korean Empire
- Died: 31 January 1951 (aged 47) Pyongyang, South Pyongan Province, North Korea
- Citizenship: North Korean
- Children: Kim Kuk-thae
- Occupation: North Korean general and politician
- Awards: North Korea's National Reunification Prize

Military service
- Allegiance: Korean People's Army
- Years of service: 1932–1951
- Commands: KPA front commander
- Battles/wars: See battles Korean independence movement: Pacification of Manchukuo; Chinese Civil War; World War II: Pacific War; Korean War: Operation Pokpoong; Battle of P'ohang-dong; First Battle of Seoul; Battle of Pusan Perimeter; Battle of Kyongju; Battle of Taegu; Pusan Perimeter offensive; UN offensive into North Korea; Battle of Inchon; Hungnam evacuation; UN September 1950 counteroffensive

Korean name
- Hangul: 김책
- Hanja: 金策
- RR: Gim Chaek
- MR: Kim Ch'aek

Kim Chaek (Korean: 김책; Hanja: 金策, 14 August 1903 – 31 January 1951) was a North Korean revolutionary, military general, and politician. His birth name was Kim Hong-gye (김홍계; 金洪啓).

== Life ==
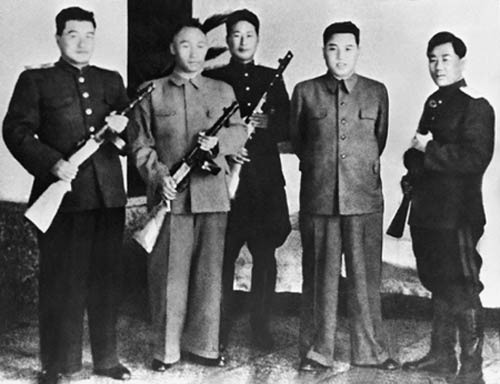
Choe Yong-gon, Kim Chaek, Kim Il, and Kang Kon receiving the first domestically produced Type 49 submachine guns from President Kim Il Sung, 1949.

Kim Chaek was born in Sŏngjin, North Hamgyong, Korea, in 1903. He and his family fled to Manchuria after Korea was colonized by Japan. In 1927, Kim joined the Chinese Communist Party and the Anti-Japanese movement to oppose the Japanese occupation. He was imprisoned for his resistance activities. After his release from prison, Kim joined the Northeast Anti-Japanese United Army in 1935 and fought alongside Kim Il Sung. He fled to the Soviet Union to escape the Japanese conquest of the partisans in 1940. He lived in Khabarovsk where he met with Kim Il Sung and formed the 88th Special Brigade. After the Soviet invasion of Manchuria, he returned to Korea along with the Soviet Army in 1945. On 9 September 1948, North Korea was established, Kim became the industry minister and deputy prime minister under Kim Il Sung. He was appointed number 2 Committee Vice Chairman in the Workers' Party of Korea. In the Korean War, he was a commander of the North Korean troops on the front lines.

A Japanese history of the Kim Il Sung family claims that Kim Chaek was purged when he was found responsible for the failure at the Inchon landing, and died in January 1951 after an American military air raid bombing or was assassinated following a power struggle. Kim Il Sung's memoir With the Century states instead that Kim died of heart failure after a long night of work.

== Posthumous honours ==
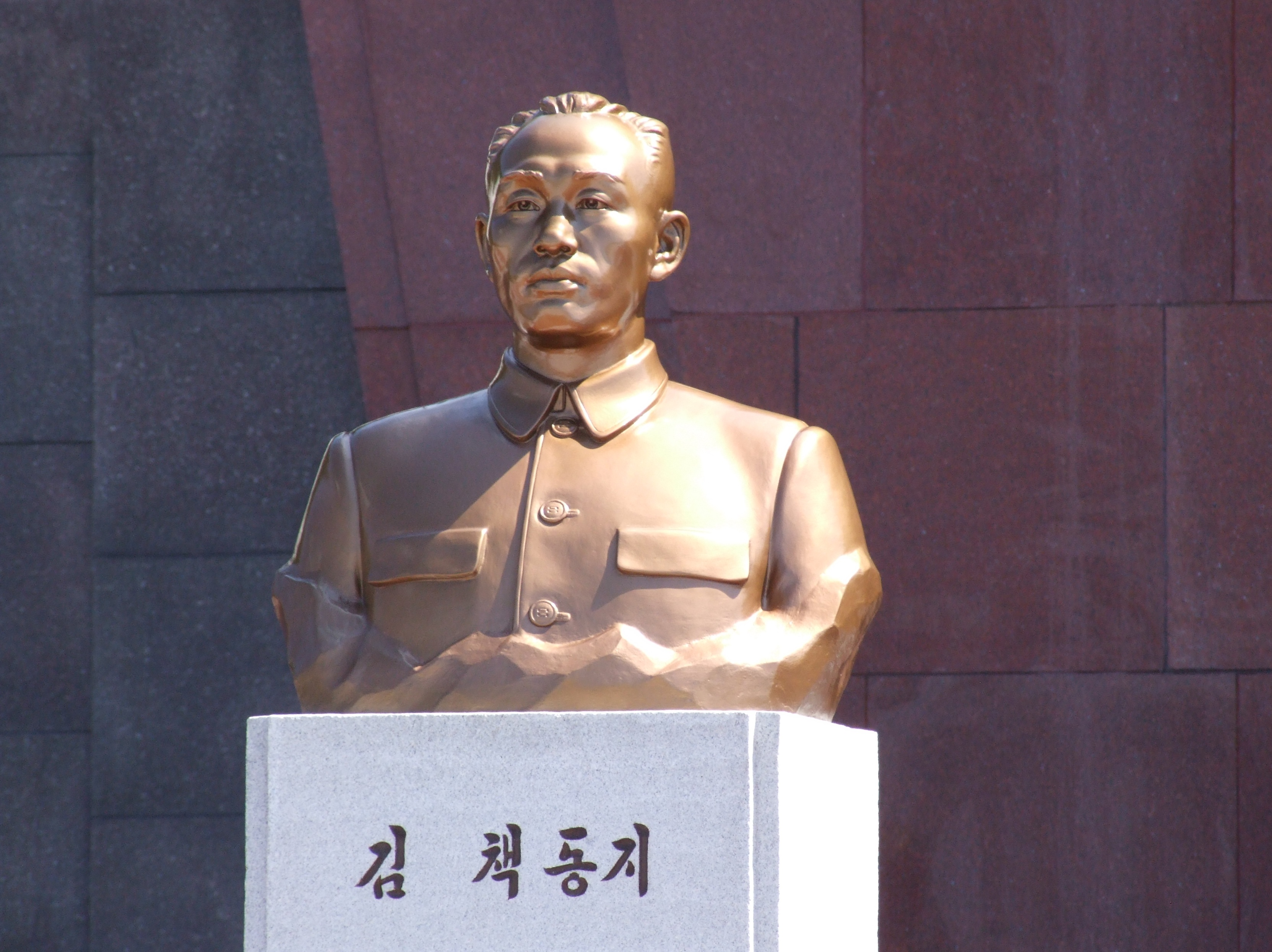
Bust at the Revolutionary Martyrs' Cemetery

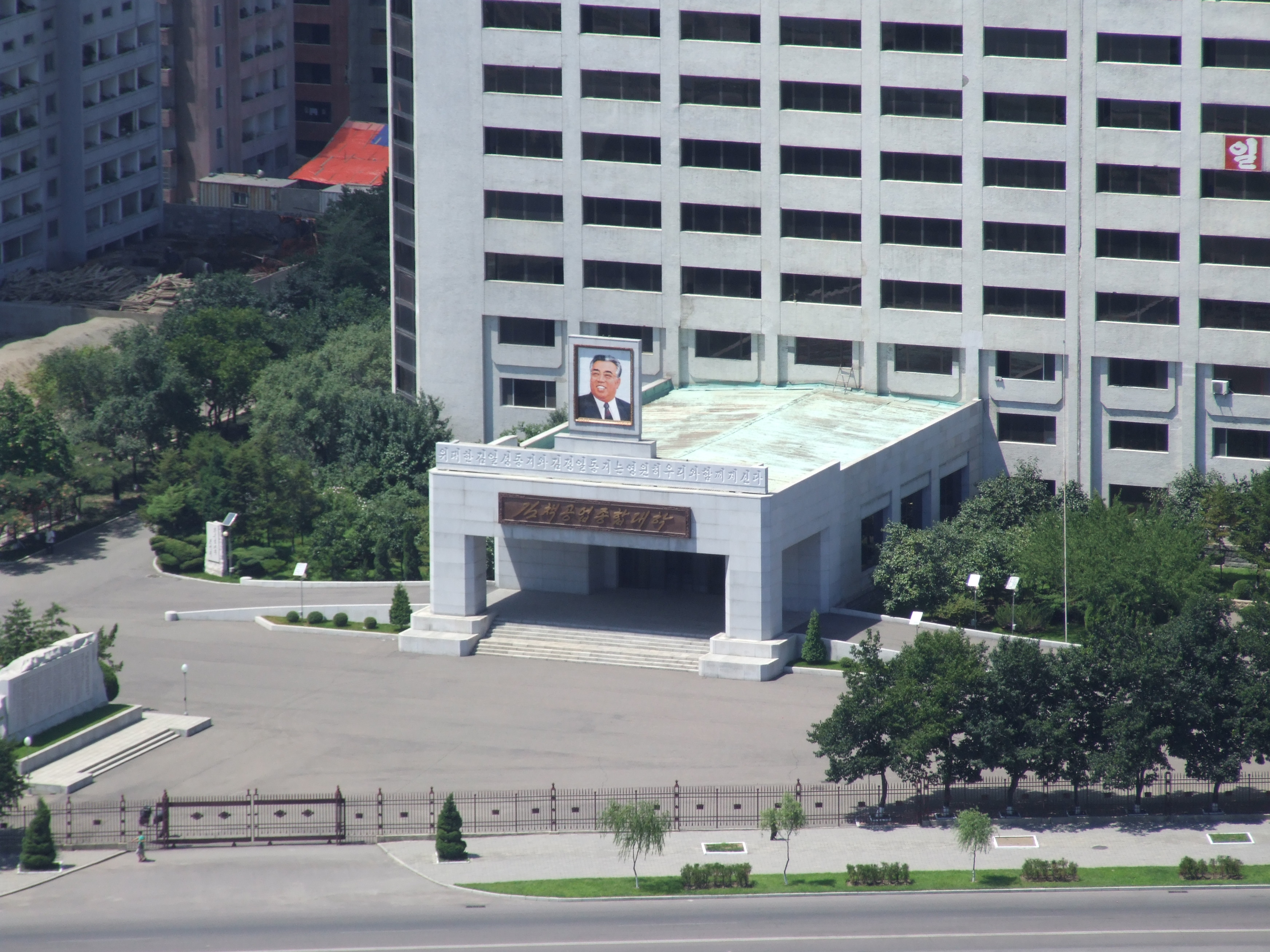
The Kim Chaek University of Technology in Otan-Kangan Street, Pyongyang

After his death, Kim Chaek's birthplace Haksong County, combined with the neighboring city of Songjin, was formally renamed to Kim Chaek City to commemorate his life and accomplishments. Kim Chaek University of Technology in Pyongyang and Kim Chaek Iron and Steel Complex in Chongjin are also named after him.

He was awarded North Korea's National Reunification Prize in 1998.

== Work ==
- Feature-length epic "Mt. Paektu" 《장편 대서사시 백두산》
