= Seishin Operation =

1945 WWII Soviet–Japanese battle in Korea

- Part of the Soviet–Japanese War of World War II
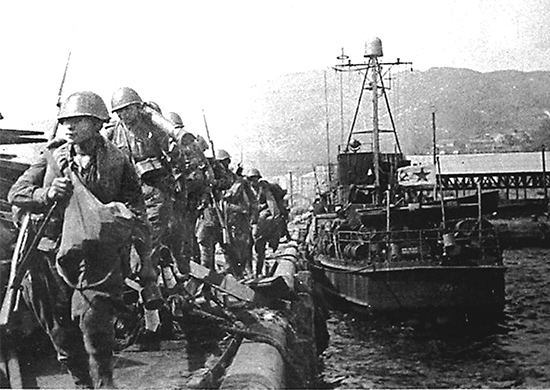
- Soviet troops in Korea, 15 August 1945
| Date | 13–16 August 1945 |
| Location | Chongjin, northern Korea |
| Result | Soviet victory |

Belligerents
| Soviet Union | Japan |

Commanders and leaders
| Ivan Yumashev; Vasily Trushin | Sokichi Nishiwaki; Hiroshi Takumi |

Units involved
| Soviet Pacific Fleet: 140th Reconnaissance Detachment; 13th Marine Brigade; 355th Marine Battalion; 62nd Machine Gun Battalion; Far Eastern Front: 335th Rifle Division; 205th Rifle Regiment; 390th Machine Gun Battalion; 393rd Rifle Division | Ranam-guyok Military District: 19th Division; 73rd Infantry Regiment; 76th Infantry Regiment; 19th Reconnaissance Regiment; Ranam Infantry School Battalion; 3rd Army: 79th Division; 289th Infantry Regiment; 79th Cavalry Regiment; Local police force |

Strength
| Over 6,500 men | 4,000–5,700 men |

Casualties and losses
| 230–300 killed and missing | 227 killed |

The Seishin Operation (Russian: Сэйсинская операция, romanized: Seysinskaya operatsiya, Korean: 청진 상륙 작전), also called Chongjin Landing Operation, was an amphibious assault on northern Korea (present day North Korea) over 490 miles from Pyongyang between 13–16 August 1945, carried out by the forces of the Soviet Northern Pacific Flotilla of the Pacific Fleet during the Soviet–Japanese War at the end of World War II.

== Prelude ==
During the Soviet invasion of Manchuria in August 1945, the 1st Far Eastern Front under Kirill Meretskov advanced south along the coast of northern Korea. It was decided to conduct three amphibious landings in the rear of the Japanese Kwantung Army.

From 11 to 13 August, the first two landings by the Pacific Fleet were executed, in which they occupied seaports Yuki (today Sonbong) and Racine (today Rason) on the Korean coast, which encountered only some small resistance in Racine.

Encouraged by the success, the fleet commander, Admiral Ivan Yumashev ordered the launch of the next amphibious assault at the port of Seishin (now Chongjin). Unlike the previous ports, Seishin was well fortified and had a strong Japanese garrison. It had some 4,000 soldiers and was enforced by retreating units of the 3rd Japanese Army, commanded by Lieutenant General Keisaku Murakami of the Kwantung Army.

In view of the successful development of the offensive of the 1st Far Eastern Front, the front commander, Marshal of the Soviet Union Kirill Meretskov, on 12 August, cancelled the previously scheduled landing in Seishin. However, the fleet command continued preparations for the landing, hoping for an easy success. Yumashev managed to get permission to conduct the operation from the Commander-in-Chief of the Soviet troops in the Far East, Marshal of the Soviet Union A. M. Vasilevsky. But, with the previous decision of Meretskov to cancel the operation, the fleet did not receive the rifle division previously planned for the landing in Seishin, and Yumashev was forced to go ahead with a limited number of troops, a brigade of marines and some individual units.

To compensate for his small force, he ordered powerful pre-strikes of aviation and torpedo boats on the port (daily bomb-assault strikes from 9 to 13 August). Nevertheless, the overall plan of the operation remained unchanged – preliminary landing of a reconnaissance group, and then building up the strength of the landing force.

Since 9 August, continuous air strikes were inflicted on the port of Seishin in which, according to Soviet data, about 10 Japanese ships were sunk. On 12 August, some Soviet ships entered the harbour and established the absence of Japanese warships there. As a result, it was decided to start the operation, without waiting for the final completion of the battle in Racine and the redeployment of the light forces of the fleet there. Therefore, the starting point for the operation remained Vladivostok, significantly remote from Seishin, which immediately deprived the Soviet command of the ability to quickly respond to a changing situation.

== Opposing forces ==
The Soviet force was composed of one destroyer, one minelayer, eight patrol ships, seven minesweepers, two small hunter boats, 18 torpedo boats, 12 landing ships and seven transports. For aviation support, 261 aircraft were allocated, 188 bombers and 73 fighters. The commander of the Naval forces was Captain First Rank A. F. Studenichnikov, and the commander of the landing party was Major General Vasily Trushin. The general command of the operation was in the hands of fleet commander Admiral I. S. Yumashev.

The Japanese had an infantry battalion, an officer's school, and a naval base in the city. During the operation, the number of Japanese troops was increased with retreating units of the Kwantung Army — first 2 infantry regiments, then the Guards Infantry Division. The Japanese troops were led in battle by the commander of the Ranan fortified area, Lieutenant General Munekichi Nishiwaki.

== Operation ==
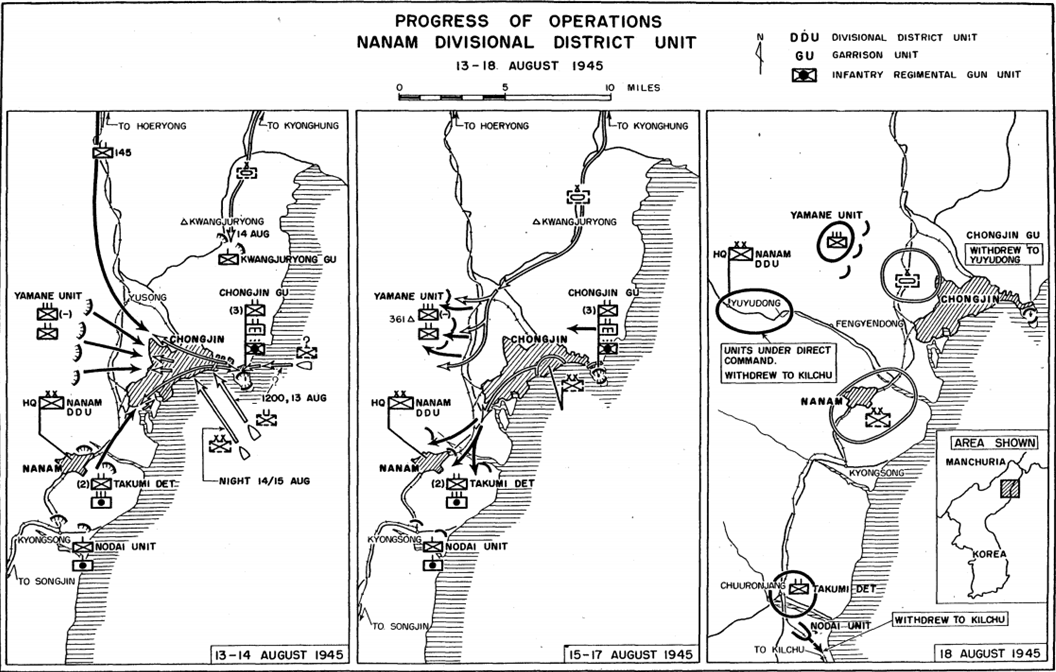
Map of the Soviet landing at Chongjin, 1945

In the afternoon of 13 August ten torpedo boats entered the port at Seishin, from which the 140th reconnaissance unit of the Pacific Fleet headquarters under the command of Lieutenant Viktor Leonov and a company of submachine gunners from the 13th Naval Infantry brigade (in total 181 men under command of Colonel A. Z. Denisin) entered the city. Leaving two boats for cover from the sea, the rest of the ships returned to Vladivostok.

The assault force easily occupied the port and the surrounding urban areas, taking advantage of the enemy's complete surprise. However, the Japanese soon launched a counterattack, at first disorderly and fragmented. The Japanese command soon restored order and launched an organized offensive against the landing force. The position of the scouts immediately deteriorated: they were cut off from the coast in an unfamiliar city and the Japanese also succeeded in cutting the detachment in two. By 18:30 pm, seven more torpedo boats landed 90 more soldiers (a machine-gun company) away from the battlefield. This unit could not break through to join the reconnaissance detachment, suffered heavy losses and was forced to conduct a defensive battle. Thus, the situation for the Soviet landing force became critical and they were threatened with annihilation.

By the end of the day, the fleet commander sent an EK-2 sentry ship and two minesweepers from Vladivostok with the 355th separate battalion of marines on board, which could reach Seishin only the next day. Another major flaw was also revealed – aviation spotters were not included in the landing, so fleet aviation struck at a distance from the battlefield to avoid bombing its own troops. As such, direct air support for the landing was absent. During the night, the paratroopers fought an extremely fierce battle in three separate groups, beating off continuous counterattacks and soon lacking ammunition.

On the morning of 14 August, the reinforcement convoy reached Seishin and landed a battalion of marines (710 men under command of Major M. P. Barabolko). The battalion commander led his troops into the city and advanced 1–3 kilometers. However, by introducing fresh forces into battle and supported by the artillery fire of an armored train, the Japanese command pushed the Soviets back to the port by the night of 14 August, where they held a bridgehead 2 km along the front and 1 km deep. Only part of the battalion led a defensive battle at the piers, several more groups of soldiers were cut off from their unit and fought separately in high-rise buildings in the city. In addition, because of the lack of knowledge of the situation, the battalion had been landed too far away from all three advanced landing groups in the city and therefore could not unite with them.

The critical situation persisted. A volunteer detachment (25 men, commander of the 3rd Rank G. V. Ternovsky) hastily formed from the crews of the ships, landed on the shore. During the night, the Soviets had to repel 14 enemy attacks. Only thanks to exceptional courage and a high level of combat training, the Marines managed to survive. The ships that arrived in the morning remained in the harbor and supported the troops with their artillery fire. Due to the bad weather on that day, aviation was practically not used in the operation (only two bombers could fly to Seishin, but they had little impact). The main detachment (23 ships) left Vladivostok with the 13th Marine Brigade aboard, and at night, also the destroyer Voikov and a tank landing barge with seven T-26 tanks sailed for Seishin.

At about 04:00 on 15 August, the ships entered the port of Seishin and the main forces of the landing force (up to 5,000 men) began to disembark at the occupied bridgehead in the port under heavy Japanese fire. The resistance of an ever-increasing adversary was so powerful that the launch of an entire brigade into battle did not lead to a turning point in the battle. Only in the middle of the day with the help of tanks and artillery fire from the ships that damaged the Japanese armored train, which was forced to leave the battlefield, the port was finally cleared and the fighting began to take the city. By evening, the city was almost completely cleared of the Japanese, saving the surviving advanced groups of paratroopers. Stubborn fighting continued in the outskirts of the city. The commander, Lieutenant General S. I. Kabanov, arrived at the port and assumed leadership of the operation.

In the afternoon, another detachment of ships left Vladivostok (one destroyer, two minesweepers, three transports, one patrol and border boat), carrying the third echelon of assault forces: 615 soldiers, 60 guns and mortars, and 94 cars. Almost all the ships remained in the harbor and supported the offensive with artillery fire. The Japanese tried to counteract them with fire from the still surviving coastal artillery and with attacks of individual aircraft. In the harbor a minesweeper was damaged by a US naval mine.

On 16 August, the third echelon of the landing force was landed in the port, while two more minesweepers were significantly damaged by mines. The fleet command, realizing that it had underestimated the enemy, was now fully building up the power of the landing force. At first, another tank landing barge with seven T-26 tanks and two vehicles aboard was sent to Seishin. Then, the next detachment of ships, not initially planned, left Vladivostok: one patrol ship, one minesweeper, six landing craft, one tank landing ship, carrying the 205th infantry regiment and military equipment. During the day, the landing forces executed a limited offensive from Seishin towards the north and north-west.

Japanese troops in the area of the city received a message about the order of the Emperor of Japan about the cessation of resistance. Although a number of units refused to lay down their arms, organized resistance had almost ceased by the end of the day. In some areas, the surrender of Japanese soldiers began.

On 17 August, the ships that had left Vladivostok the previous day, arrived at the port and the landing of the troops was carried out safely. There were small skirmishes and shootouts with individual groups and subunits of the enemy. The Japanese were taken prisoner, some of their units left the front and tried to go south overland.

Around 11:30, a forward detachment of the 25th Army under command of Colonel General Ivan Chistyakov of the 1st Far Eastern Front reached the positions of the landing force. The Seishin Landing Operation had ended.

== Awards ==
Several hundred soldiers and commanders were awarded. The commander of the 140th reconnaissance unit, Sr. Lt. Viktor Leonov received his second Hero of the Soviet Union on 14 September 1945. Chŏng Sangjin, the only Korean on the Soviet side, received an Order of the Red Banner. Red Army Nurse Mariya Tsukanova, who had been captured and tortured to death by the Japanese, was posthumously awarded the title Hero of the Soviet Union by decree of the Supreme Soviet of the USSR, becoming the only woman that fought in the Soviet-Japanese war to receive the title.
