= Kim Chaek Iron and Steel Complex =

Largest steel mill in North Korea

Kim Chaek Iron & Steel Works (Korean: 김책제철련합기업소) is the largest steel mill in North Korea, named after national independence hero and military official Kim Chaek. It is located in Songpyong-guyok, Chongjin, North Hamgyŏng Province. It was established by Nippon Steel under Japanese rule and was nationalised after the establishment of the DPRK. It is known as "The Great Metallurgical Base of the North (북방의 대야금기지)". It has fifty thousand employees.

The facility is served by the Korean State Railway via Songpyung Station.

Researchers from Yale University and Cornell University have conducted research in method of utilizing satellites and machine learning model to estimate production output of a steel plant, for Kim Chaek complex it is estimated steel output in 2023 was at 1.16 million tonnes.
