= Mariya Tsukanova =

Soviet combat medic (1924–1945)

Mariya Nikitichna Tsukanova
- Мария Никитична Цуканова
- Born: 14 September 1924; Smolensky, Omsk district, Russian SFSR, Soviet Union
- Died: 15 August 1945 (aged 20); Seysin, Japanese Korea (present-day Chongjin, North Korea)
- Military career
- Allegiance: Soviet Union
- Branch: Soviet Navy
- Service years: 1942–1945
- Rank: Corporal (Note: Most sources report her rank as Corporal, but her Hero of the Soviet Union sheet listed her as a Red Army man.)
- Unit: 355th Independent Guards Naval Infantry Battalion
- Conflicts: World War II; Soviet–Japanese War; Seishin Landing Operation †
- Awards: Hero of the Soviet Union

Mariya Nikitichna Tsukanova (Russian: Мария Никитична Цуканова; 14 September 1924 – 15 August 1945) was a combat medic in the 355th Independent Guards Naval Infantry Battalion of the Pacific Fleet during World War II. After she was killed in action in August 1945 she was posthumously awarded the title Hero of the Soviet Union on 14 September 1945, becoming the only woman who fought in the Soviet–Japanese War to be awarded the title.

== Early life ==
Tsukanova was born on 14 September 1924 to a Russian peasant family in Omsk district of the Russian SFSR. Her father died several months before she was born and her mother was a schoolteacher. Her mother remarried five years later before the family relocated to Khakassia. Both her mother and stepfather actively took part in her education. After completing primary school in Tashtyp she entered secondary school but left in 1941 after the German invasion of the Soviet Union before completing her education to work as a telephone operator after her brother and stepfather were deployed to the front; her brother was soon killed in action, resulting in her sending a request to serve in the regiment her brother fought in but was denied. Starting in December 1941 she worked as a nurse in a Rostov hospital. When she and the rest of her family that were not yet in the war were relocated to Irkutsk she found work at an aircraft production facility starting in February while taking medical courses in addition to joining the Komsomol.

== Military career ==
In April she again requested to be sent to the Eastern front, but after the establishment of women's naval detachment of the Pacific fleet in May by decree of the State Defense Committee she was sent to the Pacific front to fight in the Soviet-Japanese war as part of the 51st artillery battalion as a signalman. She was later reassigned to the 100th and 419th artillery batteries as a rangefinder. In 1944 she was reassigned to undergo further training at Naval Hospital No.8 in Vladivostok, and after completion of training, she was deployed as a medical orderly in the 355th Independent Guards Naval Infantry Battalion. The battalion saw heavy combat after the start of the Soviet–Japanese War, which began August 9, 1945; several days after the Soviet invasion of Manchukuo, she was part of a landing group to take control of the port of Seishin (present-day Chongjin, North Korea). Many of the transports used in the landing were shelled by the Japanese, during which she attended to soldiers injured from the attacks. After the landing, she continuously provided medical care to the injured, carrying wounded soldiers and their weapons to shelter. Throughout nearly two days of intense battle she saved the lives of an estimated 52 Soviet paratroopers. After her legs were wounded on the battlefield she made an improvised bandage but did not retreat. After running through the battlefield towards a group of soldiers surrounded by the Japanese, firing on enemy combatants with a machine gun, she attempted to establish a defensive position to wait for reinforcements so she could evacuate the wounded, but was heavily outnumbered and was captured by the Japanese after she lost consciousness. Seeking information about the military operations, Japanese soldiers brutally tortured Tsukanova, having gouged out her eyes and cut her with knives before burying her mutilated body.

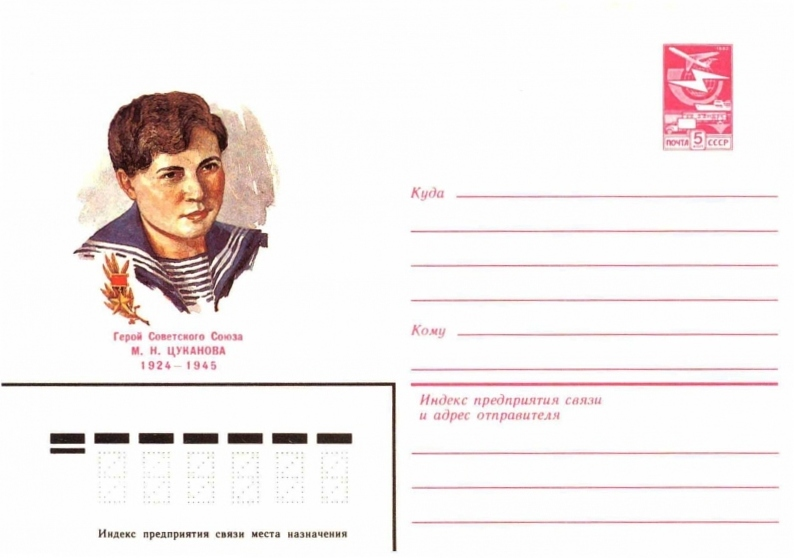
1983 Soviet envelope featuring Tsukanova.

== Honors and commemoration ==
Tsukanova was posthumously awarded the title Hero of the Soviet Union by decree of the Supreme Soviet of the USSR, becoming the first (and only) woman that fought in the Soviet-Japanese war to receive the title; a memorial to Soviet soldiers that died in the Soviet-Japanese war was constructed on the mass grave where she was buried, with an accompanying bust made in her likeness. The cities of Vladivostok where she studied medicine for several months and the city of Fokino also contain statues in her likeness. In 1983 the USSR issued envelope featuring her portrait (pictured). Streets in Abakan, Barnaul, Fokino, Irkutsk, Krasnoyarsk, and Omsk were named after her in addition to a school and fishing boat. The memorial plaque by the eternal flame in Irkutsk on Lenin Street lists her name with those of other Heroes of the Soviet Union that lived in the city as well as numerous other memorials including the Vladivostok memorial of Heroes of the Soviet Union that fought in the Pacific war.

== See also ==
External images
- Statue in Vladivostok, Russia
- Bust in Chongjin, North Korea by mass grave
- Statue in Fokino, Russia

- List of female Heroes of the Soviet Union
- Kseniya Konstantinova
- Galina Petrova

== Bibliography ==
- Cottam, Kazimiera (1998). Women in War and Resistance: Selected Biographies of Soviet Women Soldiers. Newburyport, MA: Focus Publishing/R. Pullins Co. ISBN 1-58510-160-5.
- Simonov, Andrey; Chudinova, Svetlana (2017). Женщины - Герои Советского Союза и России [Women – Heroes of the Soviet Union and Russia]. Moscow: Russian Knights Foundation and Museum of Technology Vadim Zadorozhny. ISBN 9785990960701. OCLC 1019634607.
