= Yujin Point =

Headland in North Korea

Coordinates: 40°40′38″N 129°18′06″E

Location of Yujin Point in North Korea.

Yujin Point (Korean: 유진단; Hanja: 楡津端; MR: Yujindan; "Elm-Ferry Cape") is a North Korean headland in the middle of the country's eastern coast along the Sea of Japan. It forms the eastern side of Kimchaek Bay (the former "Songjin" or "Plaksin Bay") in North Hamgyong's Kimchaek County.

Dangerous wrecks lie about half a mile (.8 km) SSW of the point.

== See also ==
- Yujin Village, its namesake village
