= Special cities of North Korea =

Special city
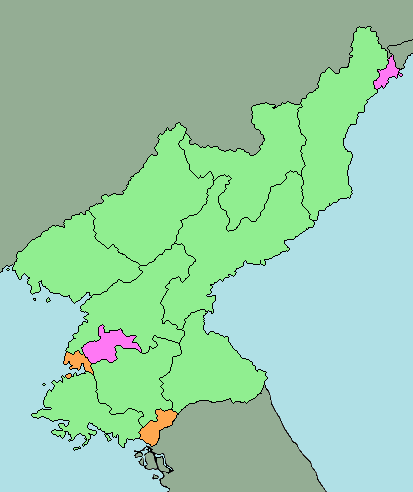
- Category: Unitary state
- Territory: Democratic People's Republic of Korea
- Current number: 4 Special Cities
- Population range: 205,000 (Rason) to 3,255,388 (Pyongyang)
- Area range: 710 square miles (1,800 km^{2}) (Rason) to 400 square miles (1,000 km^{2}) (Pyongyang)
- Government: Single-Party Government
- Subdivision: District, County

Korean name
- Hangul: 특별시
- Hanja: 特別市
- RR: teukbyeolsi
- MR: t'ŭkpyŏlsi

Special cities (Korean: 특별시) are one of the first-level administrative divisions within North Korea. There are four special cities in North Korea.

== Position in hierarchy and types ==
Special cities are the higher-ranked administrative divisions in North Korea. There are three kinds of special cities in North Korea.

Type	Hangul	Hanja	McCune–Reischauer	City names	Number of cities
Direct-administered city	직할시	直轄市	chikhalsi	Pyongyang	1
Special city	특별시	特別市	t'ŭkpyŏlsi	Rason, Nampo, Kaesong	3
Special-level city	특급시	特級市	t'ŭkkŭpsi	None	0

The first level cities have equal status to the provinces.

== List of special cities ==
Name	Chosŏn'gŭl	Hancha	Type	ISO	Population	Area (km^{2})	Density (/km^{2})	Capital	Region	Province related	Year of assignment
Pyongyang	평양직할시	平壤直轄市	Directly administered city	KP-01	3,255,288	3,194	1,019	Chung-guyok	Kwanso	South Pyongan	1946
Rason	라선특별시	羅先特別市	Special city	KP-13	205,000	746	275	Rajin-guyok	Kwanbuk	North Hamgyong	2010
Nampo	남포특별시	南浦特別市	Special city	KP-??	366,815	829	442	Waudo-guyok	Kwanso	South Pyongan	2011
Kaesong	개성특별시	開城特別市	Special-level city	none	308,440	1,309	235		Haeso	North Hwanghae	2019

Note: Pyongyang is classified as a capital city (chikhalsi), not a special city as Seoul in South Korea. In fact, the North Korean national newspaper and broadcasting say "Pyongyang Chikhalsi". Some sources, most of them coming from South Korea, refer the city as a special city; however, these are old sources. Moreover, South Korea has corrected the city as a directly governed city, according to a South Korean newspaper in 1994. The official name of Pyongyang would be "Pyongyang-si" in the Republic of Korea, which officially claims to represent the entire peninsula.

== List of defunct special cities ==
Division name	Chosŏn'gŭl	Hancha	Province absorbed into	Administered Years
Chongjin	청진시	淸津市	North Hamgyong	1960–1967, 1977–1985
Hamhung	함흥시	咸興市	South Hamgyong	1960–1967

== See also ==
- Administrative divisions of North Korea
- List of cities in North Korea
- Special cities of South Korea
- Independent city
  - Direct-administered municipality (Mainland China)
  - Special municipality (Taiwan)
  - Municipalities of Vietnam
- Federal city
  - Federal cities of Russia — similar systems
