= North Hamgyong Province E-Library =

Public library in Chongjin, North Korea

Coordinates: 41.7891707°N 129.7942002°E

- 함경북도도서관
- Entrance of North Hamgyong Province E-Library (in 2014)
- Location: Chongjin, North Hamgyong Province, North Korea
- Type: Public
- Established: 2012 (14 years ago)

North Hamgyong Province E-Library is a public library located in Chongjin, North Hamgyong Province, North Korea. The library was opened in 2012, it is situated very close to the Grand Monument Statues in the middle of Chongjin City. North Hamgyong Provincial E-Library has 301 computers, all loaded with science and technical manuals, language lessons, and various vocational courses that visitors here can take advantage of.

Interior（in 2014）
