= Sinam =

Sinam may refer to:

- Sinam, Taplejung, a village development committee in Taplejung District, Nepal
- Sinam-guyok, a district of Chongjin City, North Korea
- Sinam (2022 film), an Indian Tamil-language crime thriller film
- Sinam, a 2012 Indian film, a version of Yagam
- Sinam station, a railway station on the Gyeongbu Line in South Korea
