= Kaesimsa =

Buddhist temple in North Korea

Coordinates: 41.0542°N 129.5970°E

- Hangul: 개심사
- Hanja: 開心寺
- RR: Gaesimsa
- MR: Kaesimsa

Kaesim-sa is a Korean Buddhist temple located in the Chilbosan Mountains, North Hamgyong Province, North Korea. Founded in 826 under the Palhae kingdom and restored in 1377 by the Koryo dynasty, the temple long served as a religious retreat. The temple serves as a repository for many important buddhist sculptures, paintings, and scriptures. The temple grounds also hold a 180 kg bronze bell dating from 1764 and a famed 200-year-old chestnut tree. It is one of National Treasures of North Korea. The temple comprises the following buildings:

- Taeung Hall (대웅전/大雄殿)
- Kwanum Hall (관음전/觀音殿)
- Simgom Hall (심검당/尋劍堂)
- Umhyang Shrine (음향각/音響閣)
- Sansin Shrine (산신각/山神閣
- Manse Pavilion (만세루/萬歲樓)

== See also ==
- National Treasures of North Korea
- Korean Buddhism
- Korean architecture
