= Vasily Trushin =

Soviet naval officer

Vasily Prokofyevich Trushin
- Born: 7 February [O.S. 26 January] 1899; Vladykino, Serdobsky Uyezd, Saratov Governorate, Russian Empire
- Died: 5 April 1974 (aged 75); Moscow, Russian SFSR, Soviet Union
- Burial place: Khimkinskoye Cemetery
- Military career
- Allegiance: USSR
- Branch: Soviet Navy
- Service years: 1919–1955
- Rank: Major-General
- Conflicts: Russian Civil War; Sino-Soviet conflict Second World War; Soviet–Japanese War
- Awards: Hero of the Soviet Union; Order of Lenin (twice); Order of the Red Banner (three times); Order of the Red Star (twice)

Vasily Prokofyevich Trushin (Russian: Василий Прокофьевич Трушин; 7 February [O.S. 26 January] 1899 – 5 April 1974) was an officer of the Soviet Navy. He worked in the Naval Infantry, reaching the rank of major-general and being awarded the title of Hero of the Soviet Union.

Born in 1899, Trushin joined the Red Army in 1919 and saw action on the Turkestan Front during the Russian Civil War. By the late 1920s he was in the Far East, fighting in the Sino-Soviet conflict in 1929. He rose through the ranks and positions to command rifle battalions and regiments, before serving in the Pacific Fleet, commanding the 14th and then the 13th Marine Brigades. In August 1945, the Soviet–Japanese War began and Trushin was ordered to lead the carry out a landing operation to capture the Japanese naval base of Seishin. The Seishin Operation ran into difficulties when, contrary to expectations, the Japanese chose to defend the city. Trushin landed with the main force and took command on the spot, securing the city. For his performance in this operation, Trushin was awarded the title of Hero of the Soviet Union.

Trushin remained in the navy following the war, serving in the Baltic Fleet and the Black Sea Fleet. He ended his career as a chief of department of the Navy's Combat Training Directorate, retiring in December 1955 with the rank of major-general. He died in 1974 at the age of 75.

== Biography ==
=== Early years and wartime service ===
Trushin was born on 7 February [O.S. 26 January] 1899 in the village of Vladykino, in what was Serdobsky Uyezd, Saratov Governorate, in the Russian Empire. He joined the Red Army in 1919 and served during the Russian Civil War on the Turkestan Front, initially as a squad commander, then platoon commander, and finally assistant company commander. After studies at the 4th Tashkent Command Staff United School, he graduated in 1921, joined the All-Union Communist Party (Bolsheviks), and took part in campaigns against the Basmachi movement. In March 1923, Trushin was appointed company commander in the 9th Don Rifle Division in the North Caucasus Military District, before transferring to the Far East in July 1929, and serving as commander of a company, and then a stage point of the 1st Chita Rifle Regiment. In this capacity he saw action during the Sino-Soviet conflict.

In December 1930, Trushin became secretary of the 1st Chita Rifle Regiment's party bureau, and then in April 1931, took command of a rifle battalion, and from November 1931, commanded a training battalion in the 1st Pacific Rifle Division. He commanded the Vladivostok Separate Rifle Regiment from June 1936, graduating from the Vystrel course that year, and in September 1937, was appointed commandant of Vladivostok. His next posting was as sector commander in the Posyet fortified area from April 1939, and in October that year, as commander of the Khasan coastal defence sector. He continued to be based in the Far East following the Axis invasion of the Soviet Union in June 1941, being appointed to command the Pacific Fleet's 14th Marine Brigade from October 1942, and then the 13th Marine Brigade from November 1943.

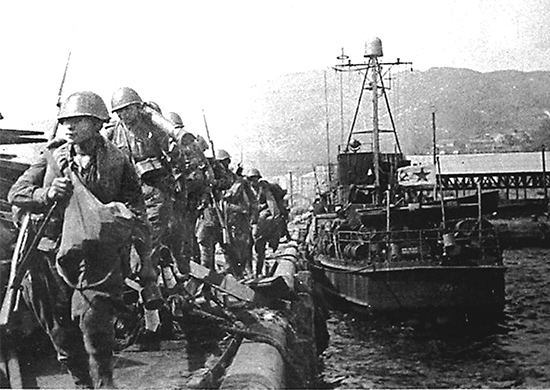
The Seishin Operation, 15 August 1945. Soviet troops landing at the port.

In August 1945, the Soviet–Japanese War began and Trushin was ordered to lead the brigade in action in a landing operation to capture the Japanese naval base of Seishin, present-day Chongjin, North Korea. The Seishin Operation ran into difficulties when, contrary to expectations, the Japanese chose to defend the city. On 14 August, Trushin oversaw the landing of the advanced detachment, followed by the main force on 15 August. Trushin himself landed with the main force and took command on the spot. After overcoming strong resistance, the Soviet forces secured the city by midday on 16 August. For his performance in this operation, Trushin was awarded the title of Hero of the Soviet Union on 14 September 1945.

=== Post-war service ===
Trushin remained in the navy following the war, and in April 1946, was appointed commander of the 63rd Marine Brigade of 4th Fleet in the Baltic. He was transferred from the Baltic to the Black Sea Fleet, taking charge of the fleet's training detachment in April 1947. He returned to the Baltic in June 1948, this time as commander of the 8th Fleet's 1st Machine Gun and Artillery Division. He took the Higher Courses at the Voroshilov Military Academy, graduating in 1950. In May that year he became deputy chief of the Coastal Artillery, Marines and Land Forces Combat Training Directorate, and chief of the Naval General Staff's Third Department. In September 1951, he became chief of the Third Department and deputy chief of the Coastal Defence Land Forces and Marines Navy Directorate, and in May 1953, deputy chief of the department. In June 1955, Trushin was appointed chief of department of the Navy's Combat Training Directorate. Trushin retired in December 1955 with the rank of major-general, settling in Moscow. He died on 5 April 1974 at the age of 75, was buried at the Khimkinskoye Cemetery.

== Awards and honours ==
Over his career Trushin was awarded the title of Hero of the Soviet Union, the Order of Lenin twice, three Orders of the Red Banner, two Orders of the Red Star, and various medals. In 2019 the Ivan Gren-class landing ship Vasily Trushin, named in his honour, was laid down.
