= Yi-kyung =

- Hangul: 이경
- RR: Igyeong
- MR: Igyŏng

Yi-kyung, also spelled Lee-kyung, is a Korean given name.

People with this name include:

- Chun Lee-kyung (born 1976), South Korean short track speed skater
- Kwak Yi-kyong (born 1979), South Korean LGBT rights activist
- Lee Yi-kyung (born 1989), South Korean male actor
- Woo Yi-kyung (우이경; born 1987), South Korean pop singer

Fictional characters with this name include:

- Han Yi-kyung, in 2005 South Korean television series Only You
- Han Yi-kyung, in 2007 South Korean television series Air City
- Song Yi-kyung, in 2011 South Korean television series 49 Days
- Jin Yi-kyung, in 2015 South Korean television series Angry Mom
- Seo Yi-kyung, in South Korean Netflix adaptation Sweet Home (TV series)

== See also ==
- List of Korean given names
- Kim Yik-yung (김익영, born 1935), South Korean ceramic artist
- Jeong Yi-kyeong (정의경, born 1985), South Korean handball player, whose given name is spelled Ui-gyeong in Revised Romanisation
