= Kimchaek =

Kimchaek 김책시 金策市
- Municipal City

Korean transcription(s)
  - Chosŏn'gŭl: 김책시
  - Hancha: 金策市
  - McCune-Reischauer: Kimch'aek si
  - Revised Romanization: Gimchaek-si
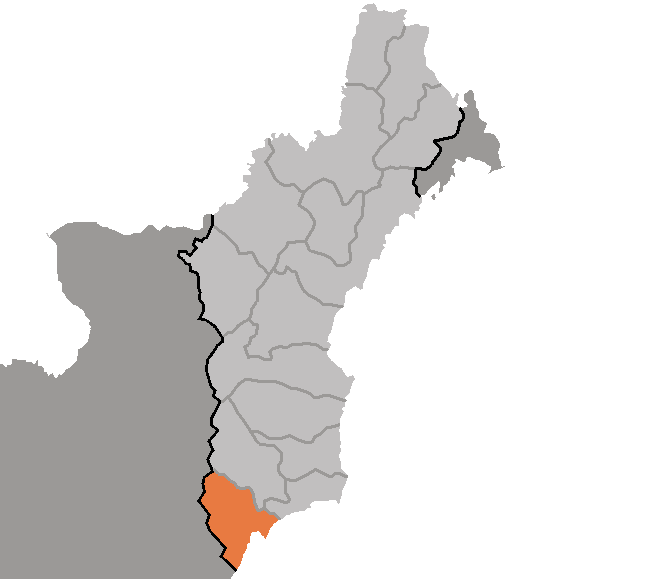
- Map of North Hamgyong showing the location of Kimchaek
- Interactive map of Kimchaek
- Location within North Korea
- Coordinates: 40°40′2″N 129°12′2″E
- Country: North Korea
- Province: North Hamgyong
- Administrative divisions: 22 tong, 22 ri

Population (2008)
  - Total: 207,699
  - Dialect: Hamgyŏng
- Time zone: UTC+9 (Pyongyang Time)

Kimch'aek (Korean pronunciation: [kim.tsʰɛk̚]), formerly Sŏngjin (Chosŏn'gŭl: 성진, Hancha: 城津), is a city in North Hamgyong Province, North Korea. It was an open port in 1899. It has a population of 207,699.

== Etymology ==
The city received its current name in 1951 during the Korean War, in honor of the Korean People's Army (KPA) general, Kim Chaek. It was known as Jōshin during Japanese rule between 1910 and 1945.

== Climate ==
Kimchaek has a hot-summer humid continental climate (Köppen climate classification: Dwa).

Climate data for Kimchaek (1991–2020 normals, extremes 1906–present)
Month	Jan	Feb	Mar	Apr	May	Jun	Jul	Aug	Sep	Oct	Nov	Dec	Year
Record high °C (°F)	14.0 (57.2)	16.7 (62.1)	27.8 (82.0)	35.2 (95.4)	34.0 (93.2)	34.3 (93.7)	37.0 (98.6)	36.6 (97.9)	32.9 (91.2)	30.2 (86.4)	23.7 (74.7)	17.8 (64.0)	37.0 (98.6)
Mean daily maximum °C (°F)	2.2 (36.0)	3.2 (37.8)	8.0 (46.4)	14.2 (57.6)	18.0 (64.4)	21.0 (69.8)	24.7 (76.5)	26.5 (79.7)	23.5 (74.3)	18.2 (64.8)	10.6 (51.1)	4.1 (39.4)	14.5 (58.1)
Daily mean °C (°F)	−3.3 (26.1)	−1.7 (28.9)	2.9 (37.2)	8.4 (47.1)	12.6 (54.7)	16.9 (62.4)	21.0 (69.8)	22.6 (72.7)	18.8 (65.8)	12.7 (54.9)	5.3 (41.5)	−1.1 (30.0)	9.6 (49.3)
Mean daily minimum °C (°F)	−7.9 (17.8)	−6.5 (20.3)	−1.5 (29.3)	3.8 (38.8)	8.8 (47.8)	14.1 (57.4)	18.6 (65.5)	19.6 (67.3)	14.5 (58.1)	7.5 (45.5)	0.5 (32.9)	−5.7 (21.7)	5.5 (41.9)
Record low °C (°F)	−26.0 (−14.8)	−20.0 (−4.0)	−15.0 (5.0)	−7.1 (19.2)	−0.5 (31.1)	1.0 (33.8)	9.0 (48.2)	10.6 (51.1)	2.8 (37.0)	−4.0 (24.8)	−16.6 (2.1)	−25.1 (−13.2)	−26.0 (−14.8)
Average precipitation mm (inches)	16.7 (0.66)	12.7 (0.50)	16.1 (0.63)	33.0 (1.30)	60.5 (2.38)	61.5 (2.42)	147.4 (5.80)	136.7 (5.38)	81.8 (3.22)	41.5 (1.63)	36.0 (1.42)	20.8 (0.82)	664.7 (26.17)
Average precipitation days (≥ 0.1 mm)	5.5	3.8	3.8	5.0	6.9	7.8	9.9	8.8	5.4	4.0	4.4	5.0	70.3
Average snowy days	7.2	4.6	3.8	0.5	0.1	0.0	0.0	0.0	0.0	0.1	2.3	5.6	24.2
Average relative humidity (%)	65.4	67.3	69.2	69.9	78.7	85.7	88.2	85.8	79.0	71.7	66.5	63.3	74.2
Mean monthly sunshine hours	173	197	231	225	222	141	141	173	207	218	172	161	2,261
Source 1: Korea Meteorological Administration
Source 2: Deutscher Wetterdienst (sun, 1961–1990), (Note: Station ID for Kimchaek is 47025 Use this station ID to locate the sunshine duration) Meteo Climat (extremes)

== Administrative divisions ==
Kimch'aek-si is divided into 22 tong (neighbourhoods) and 22 ri (villages):

- Changhyŏn-dong
- Chegang 1-dong
- Chegang 2-dong
- Chegang 3-dong
- Ch'ŏnghak-tong
- Haean-dong
- Haksŏng-dong
- Hanch'ŏn-dong
- Kŭmch'ŏn-dong
- Ŏb'ŏk-tong
- Ryŏnho-dong
- Sinp'yŏng-dong
- Sŏngnam-dong
- Songryŏng 1-dong
- Songryŏng 2-dong
- Song'am-dong
- Ssangryong-dong
- Suwŏn-dong
- Taedong 1-dong
- Taedong 2-dong
- T'anso-dong
- Yŏkchŏn-dong
- Ch'undong-ri
- Haktong-ri
- Hodong-ri
- Hŭngp'yŏng-ri
- Manch'ul-li
- Okch'ŏl-li
- Panghang-ri
- P'ungnyŏl-li
- Rimmyŏng-ri
- Ryongho-ri
- Sangp'yŏng-ri
- Sech'ŏl-li
- Sŏkho-ri
- Songhŭng-ri
- Songjung-ri
- Sŏngsang-ri
- Sudong-ri
- Tŏg'il-li
- Tonghŭng-ri
- T'apha-ri
- Ŭnho-ri
- Wŏnp'yŏng-ri

== Economy ==
Kimchaek is an important port on the Sea of Japan (East Sea of Korea), and is home to an ironworks and the Kimch’aek Polytechnic Institute.

== Transport ==
Kimchaek is on the Pyongra Line railway.

The city has one trolleybus line, with a length of 9.1 km, running from Songnam-dong to Haksong-dong with the depot located in Sinpyong-dong.

== Sport ==
Wolmido Sports Club, affiliated with the Ministry of Culture and Fine Arts of North Korea, play at the Kimchaek Municipal Stadium, which has a capacity of 30,000. The men's team plays in the DPR Korea Premier Football League, whilst the women's team plays in the DPR Korea Women's League.

== See also ==
- List of cities in North Korea
- Geography of North Korea
