= 19th Division (Imperial Japanese Army) =

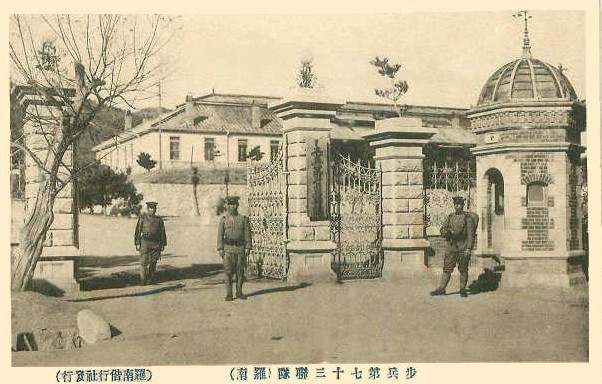
- IJA 73rd Infantry Regiment HQ, Ranam, Korea
- Active: 24 December 1915 - 1945
- Country: Empire of Japan
- Branch: Imperial Japanese Army
- Type: Infantry
- Garrison/HQ: Ranam, North Hamgyong Province, Korea
- Nickname: Tiger Division
- Engagements: Japanese invasion of Manchuria; Battle of Lake Khasan; Battle of Luzon

The 19th Division (第19師団, Dai-jūkyū Shidan) was an infantry division in the Imperial Japanese Army. Its tsūshōgō code name was the Tiger Division (虎兵團, Tora heidan). It was also occasionally referred to in Korean accounts as Ranam Division, after the location of its main base. The 19th Division and the 20th Division were both raised as a garrison force for Korea. After Japan's victory in the Russo-Japanese War of 1904-1905, and subsequent occupation, and then annexation of Korea in 1910, the need was felt for a dedicated garrison force, raised from people with local knowledge. The 19th Division was stationed in far northeast Korea, in what is now North Hamgyong Province. The division received its colors on 24 December 1915 and headquarters have moved to Yongsan District 16 April 1916; however, the division was not considered combat-ready until 1918. The delay was due to limited funding available for the division to build its facilities in Korea and the need to recruit and train personnel from mainland Japan. In addition, the new division was beset with problems related to malaria and shigellosis at its main base at Ranam in northern Korea, having recorded 672 disease-related officers casualties during 1917. As result, the headquarters have moved to Ranam-guyok only 10 April 1919. The first commander of the 19th Division was Lieutenant General Tachibana Koichirō.

== Action ==
After the Mukden Incident 18 September 1931, the regiment-sized detachment of the 19th Division, organized as 38th Independent Mixed Brigade was called upon to provide assistance to 20th division in Japanese invasion of Manchuria, during which it occupied Changchun and Harbin, and in the subsequent Pacification of Manchukuo. It continued to be stationed in Manchuria afterwards.

26 July 1938, the 19th division was called for a Battle of Lake Khasan against the Soviet Union. Afterwards, with increasing tension and subsequent border clashes the 19th Division had 500 killed and 900 wounded from 6 to 11 August 1938. It was then recalled to its original garrison location in Ranam on the Korean border area with the Soviet Union.

In May, 1943, the IJA 74th Infantry Regiment was separated from the 19th Division and was elevated to become the core of the new 30th Division. As the situation for Japan continued to deteriorate for Japan in the Pacific War, a decision was made to trust in the Soviet–Japanese Neutrality Pact, and reduce forces held back in reserve against the Soviet Union. In December 1944, the remainder of the 19th Division was transferred to the control of Japanese Fourteenth Area Army in the Philippines. The 19th Division was subsequently largely annihilated in combat in the mountains of central Luzon during the subsequent Battle of Luzon from January 1945 and ceased to exist a functional unit at that time.

As the sea blockade made reinforcement of Luzon problematic, parts of 19th division were re-routed to Kaohsiung, Taiwan 22 December 1944.

== See also ==
- List of Japanese Infantry Divisions
