= Hoeryong =

- Municipal City
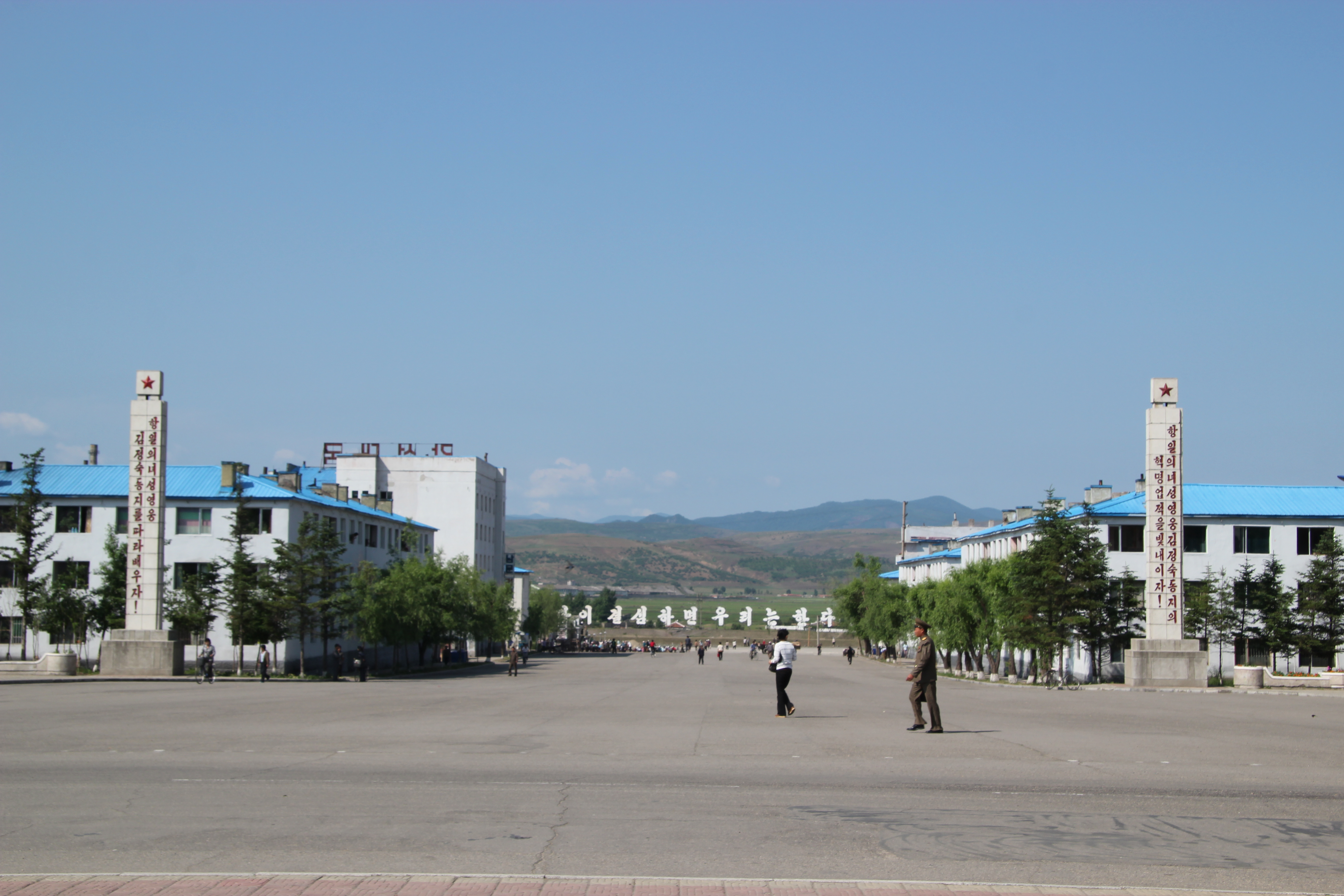
- Hoeryong City Centre

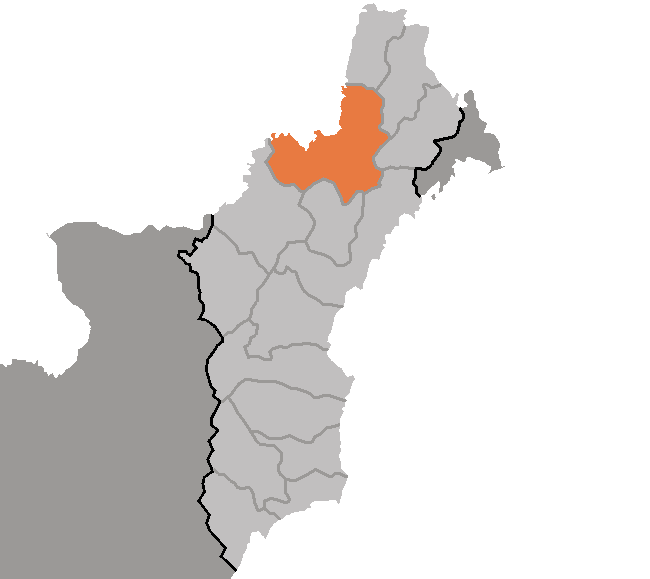
- Map of North Hamgyong showing the location of Hoeryong
- Interactive map of Hoeryong
- Location within North Korea
- Coordinates: 42°26′N 129°45′E
- Country: North Korea
- Province: North Hamgyong
- Administrative divisions: 19 tong, 28 ri

Population (2008)
  - Total: 153,532
  - Dialect: Hamgyŏng
- Time zone: UTC+9 (Pyongyang Time)

Korean name
- Hangul: 회령시
- Hanja: 會寧市
- RR: Hoeryeong-si
- MR: Hoeryŏng-si

Hoeryŏng (Korean: 회령시; Korean pronunciation: [ɸwe.ɾjʌŋ]) is a city in North Hamgyong Province, North Korea. It is located opposite Jilin Province, China, with the Tumen River in between. Sanhe (三合鎮), in Longjing City, is the closest Chinese town across the river. Hoeryŏng is the birthplace of Kim Il Sung's first wife and Kim Jong Il's mother, Kim Jong Suk. The Hoeryong Revolutionary Site commemorates the birthplace.

The former Hoeryŏng concentration camp (Kwalliso No. 22) was located 20 kilometres (12 mi) from the city.

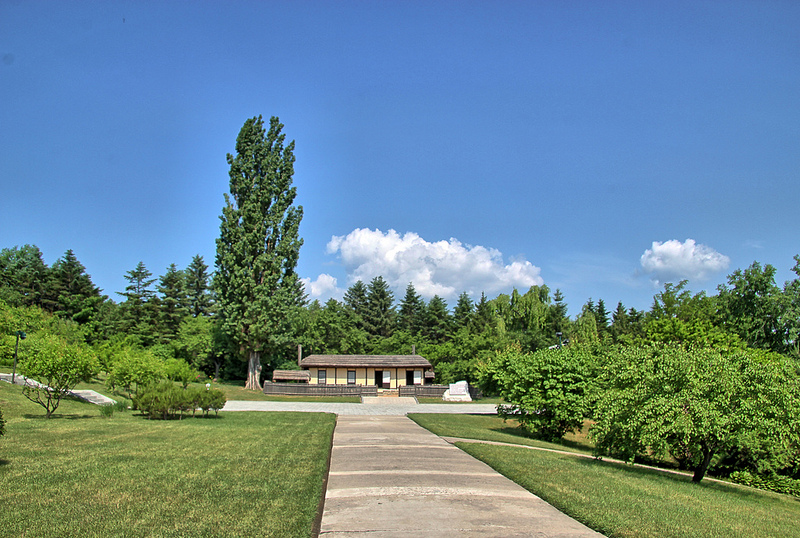
Birthplace of Kim Jong-suk

== History ==
Hoeryŏng was one of the six posts/garrisons (Chosŏngŭl: 육진, Hanja: 六鎭) established under the order of Sejong the Great of Joseon (1418 - 1450) to safeguard his people from the potentially hostile semi-nomadic Jurchens living north of the Yalu river. In 1952, some territories of Hoeryŏng (then a county), which included myoen of Poŭl and parts of myoens of Yonghung and Pyŏksŏng, were incorporated into the then newly created Yusŏn county. After the 1974 incorporation of Yusŏn county, the Yusŏn region became a up and was renamed as Yusŏn worker's region. In early May 2007, the newly appointed Prime Minister Kim Yong-il visited Hoeryŏng. At the time, the Prime Minister brought with him on his train one carriage worth of glass (made in South Korea) and 3 carriages worth of cement. After delivering the goods to the People's Committee of Hoeryŏng he ordered that the city of Hoeryŏng be decorated and adorned as much as a city where Mother Kim Jong Suk's birthplace should be.

== Administrative divisions ==
Hoeryŏng-si is divided into 19 tong (neighbourhoods) and 28 ri (villages):

- Chungdo-dong
- Chungbong-dong
- Ch'irwŏlp'aril-dong
- Kang'an-dong
- Kyerim-dong
- Kungsim-dong
- Mang'yang-dong
- Nammun-dong
- Osandŏk-tong
- Poŭl-dong
- Saemaŭl-dong
- San'ŏp-tong
- Sech'ŏn-dong
- Sinch'ŏn-dong
- Sŏngch'ŏn-dong
- Subuk-tong
- Tongmyŏng-dong
- Yŏkchŏn-dong
- Yusŏn-dong
- Ch'angt'ae-ri
- Ch'anghyo-ri
- Hakp'o-ri
- Hangyong-ri
- Hongsal-li
- In'ge-ri
- Kesang-ri
- Keha-ri
- Kulsal-li
- Kŭmsaeng-ri
- Musal-li
- Namsal-li
- Obong-ri
- Oryu-ri
- Pangwŏl-li
- Pyŏksŏng-ri
- P'ungsal-li
- Raksaeng-ri
- Ryongch'ŏl-li
- Saŭl-li
- Sinhŭng-ri
- Sŏngbung-ri
- Sŏngdong-ri
- Songhang-ri
- Taedong-ri
- Tokhŭng-ri
- Wŏnsal-li
- Yŏngsu-ri

== Economy ==
Hoeryŏng's main industries are mining machines and a paper mill. The area contains many mines. According to media reports, in 2017 ordinary residents in Hoeryong receive electricity for 3–4 hours per day. However, many people do not have electricity at all.

== Civil unrest ==
It is reported that on 24 September 2008 only about 20% of Hoeryŏng's city residents attended a civilian defence-training programme held in Hoeryŏng City. The other 80% are thought to have stayed home or tended to private patch fields. As punishment, authorities from the Civilian Defence ordered non-attendees to pay KP₩5,000, however this fine was largely ignored.

== 2016 Flood ==
On 29 August 2016, as the result of Typhoon Lionrock, the Tumen River flooded, making many of the residents homeless and causing substantial property damage. The displaced residents moved to China.

== Climate ==
Hoeryong has a humid continental climate (Köppen climate classification: Dwb).

Climate data for Hoeryong
Month	Jan	Feb	Mar	Apr	May	Jun	Jul	Aug	Sep	Oct	Nov	Dec	Year
Mean daily maximum °C (°F)	−5.1 (22.8)	−2.0 (28.4)	4.2 (39.6)	12.6 (54.7)	18.3 (64.9)	21.4 (70.5)	24.8 (76.6)	25.4 (77.7)	21.2 (70.2)	14.7 (58.5)	4.9 (40.8)	−2.7 (27.1)	11.5 (52.7)
Daily mean °C (°F)	−11.1 (12.0)	−8.5 (16.7)	−2.2 (28.0)	5.7 (42.3)	11.4 (52.5)	16.0 (60.8)	20.3 (68.5)	20.8 (69.4)	15.3 (59.5)	8.1 (46.6)	−0.8 (30.6)	−8.4 (16.9)	5.6 (42.0)
Mean daily minimum °C (°F)	−17.0 (1.4)	−15.0 (5.0)	−8.5 (16.7)	−1.2 (29.8)	4.6 (40.3)	10.7 (51.3)	15.8 (60.4)	16.3 (61.3)	9.4 (48.9)	1.5 (34.7)	−6.4 (20.5)	−14.0 (6.8)	−0.3 (31.4)
Average precipitation mm (inches)	6 (0.2)	6 (0.2)	14 (0.6)	29 (1.1)	61 (2.4)	94 (3.7)	112 (4.4)	155 (6.1)	82 (3.2)	38 (1.5)	20 (0.8)	8 (0.3)	625 (24.5)
Source: Climate-Data.org

== See also ==
- List of cities in North Korea
- Geography of North Korea
