= Chilbosan (North Hamgyong) =

Mountain in North Hamgyong, North Korea

Highest point
- Coordinates: 41°02′36″N 129°36′50″E

Geography
- Location: North Korea

Korean name
- Hangul: 칠보산
- Hanja: 七寶山
- RR: Chilbosan
- MR: Ch'ilbosan

Chilbosan (Korean: 칠보산), or Mount Chilbo, is a mountain in North Hamgyong Province, North Korea. The name translates as seven treasures, stemming from the legend that Chilbo-san has seven treasures buried in it. The name is also translated as Seven Jeweled Mountain. Chilbo-san is particularly noted for its views when covered in snow. The mountain is commonly divided into Inner Chilbo, Outer Chilbo, and Sea Chilbo. Amongst the main attractions apart from the views is the Kaesim Temple, dating from the 9th century.

== Environment ==
Major part of the mountain is covered by mixed broadleaf and coniferous forest and protected in a 30,000 ha national park. It has been identified by BirdLife International as an Important Bird Area (IBA) because it supports populations of Oriental storks and critically endangered Baer's pochards.

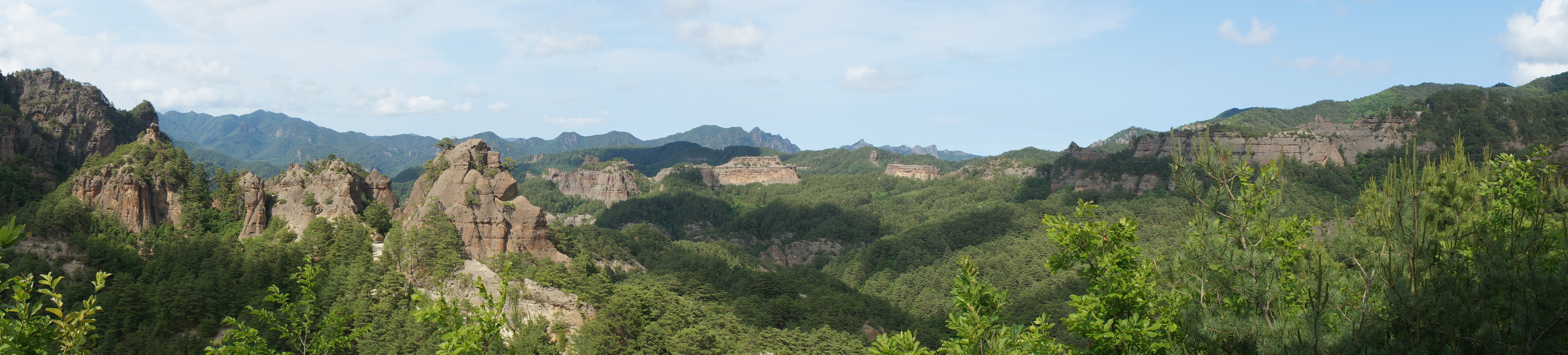
A view of Chilbosan. Much of the mountain is covered by mixed broadleaf and coniferous forest
