= Kim Yik-yung =

South Korean ceramic artist (born 1935)

Kim Yik yung
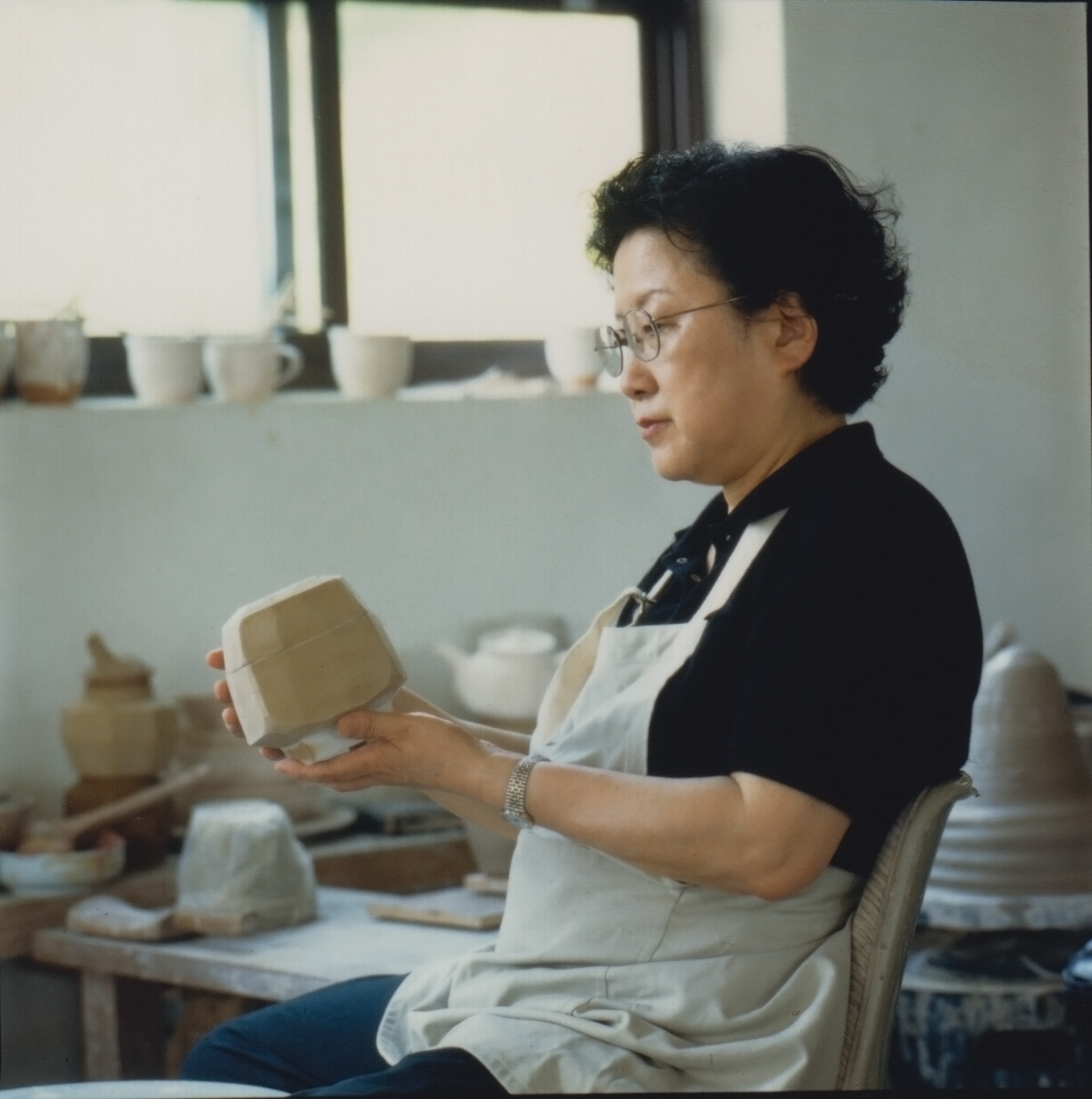
- Kim Yikyung at her studio
- Born: 19 February 1935 (age 91); Chongjin, Hamgyong Province, Korea, Empire of Japan
- Known for: Ceramic crafts

- Kim Yik-yung
- Hangul: 김익영
- Hanja: 金益寧
- RR: Gim Ikyeong
- MR: Kim Igyŏng

Kim Yik Yung (Korean: 김익영; born 19 February 1935) is a South Korean ceramic artist. Kim was born in Chongjin, Hamgyong Province, Korea, Empire of Japan.

She studied chemical engineering at Seoul National University and then went to the US, where she studied ceramics at Alfred University in New York. After returning to Korea, she worked as a researcher in the National Museum of Korea.

Kim was co-winner of the 2004 "Artist of the Year" award from the National Museum of Modern and Contemporary Art for significant contribution to the development of Korean contemporary ceramic art. Her work has been shown in major exhibitions in Korea, Japan, the United States, and Europe.

== Education ==
- 1957 B. S. Degree, Chemical Engineering, Seoul National University
- 1958 Finished 1-year course of Ceramic Engineering, Seoul National University
- 1959 Finished 1-year course of Crafts and Arts, Hongik University
- 1961 M. F. A. College of Ceramics at Alfred University

== Experiences ==
- 1958–1959 Research Assistant, AID Central Design Demonstration Center
- 1960–1961 Teaching Assistant, College of Ceramics at Alfred University
- 1961–1963 Assistant to the Curator, National Museum of Korea
- 1963–1964 Full-time Instructor, Duksung Women's University
- 1964–1965 Invitational Research instructor, Kyoto City University of Arts
- 1965–1967 Instructor, Housing and Interior Design, Yonsei University
- 1967–1968 Research Assistant, AID Design Development Project
- 1969–1974 Planning Manager, Design Development Section, Korea Trade Promotion Center
- 1975–2000 Professor, Ceramics Design, College of Design and Architecture, Kookmin University in Korea
- 2000–present Professor emeritus, Kookmin University

== Work in collections ==
- National Gallery of Contemporary Arts, South Korea
- Hoam Art Museum, Seoul, Korea
- Youngeun Museum of Art, Daeyu Cultural Foundation, Korea
- Everson Museum, Syracuse, U. S. A.
- Cleveland Museum of Art, Cleveland, U. S. A.
- Royal Museum of Mariemont, Brussels, Belgium
- British Museum, United Kingdom
- National Museum of Scotland, United Kingdom
- Victoria and Albert Museum, United Kingdom
- Detroit Institute of Art, U. S. A.
- Royal Ontario Museum, Canada
- Smithsonian Institution, U. S. A.
- National Museum of History, Taipei
- Asian Art Museum, U. S. A.
- Philadelphia Museum of Art, U. S. A.
- Smart Museum of Art, U. S. A.
- Honolulu Academy of Arts, U. S. A.
- Hawaii University Gallery, U. S. A.
- San Antonio Museum of Art, U. S. A.

== See also ==
- List of Korean ceramic artists and sculptors
- Korean ceramics
