= Chongjin =

Capital city of North Hamgyong Province, North Korea

Chongjin 청진
- Municipal city

Korean transcription(s)
  - Chŏsŏn'gŭl: 청진시
  - Hancha: 淸津市
  - McCune–Reischauer: Ch'ŏngjin-si
  - Revised Romanization of Korean: Cheongjin-si
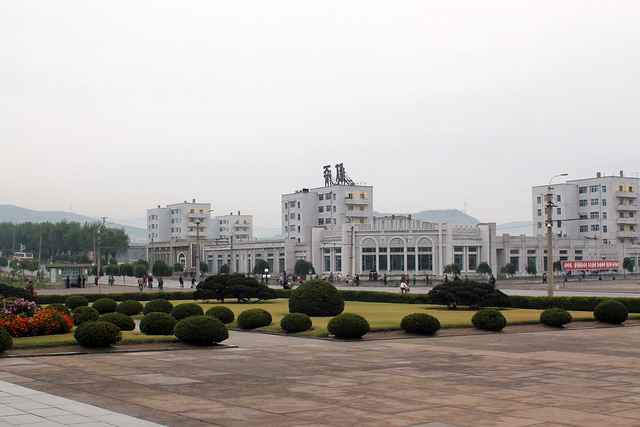
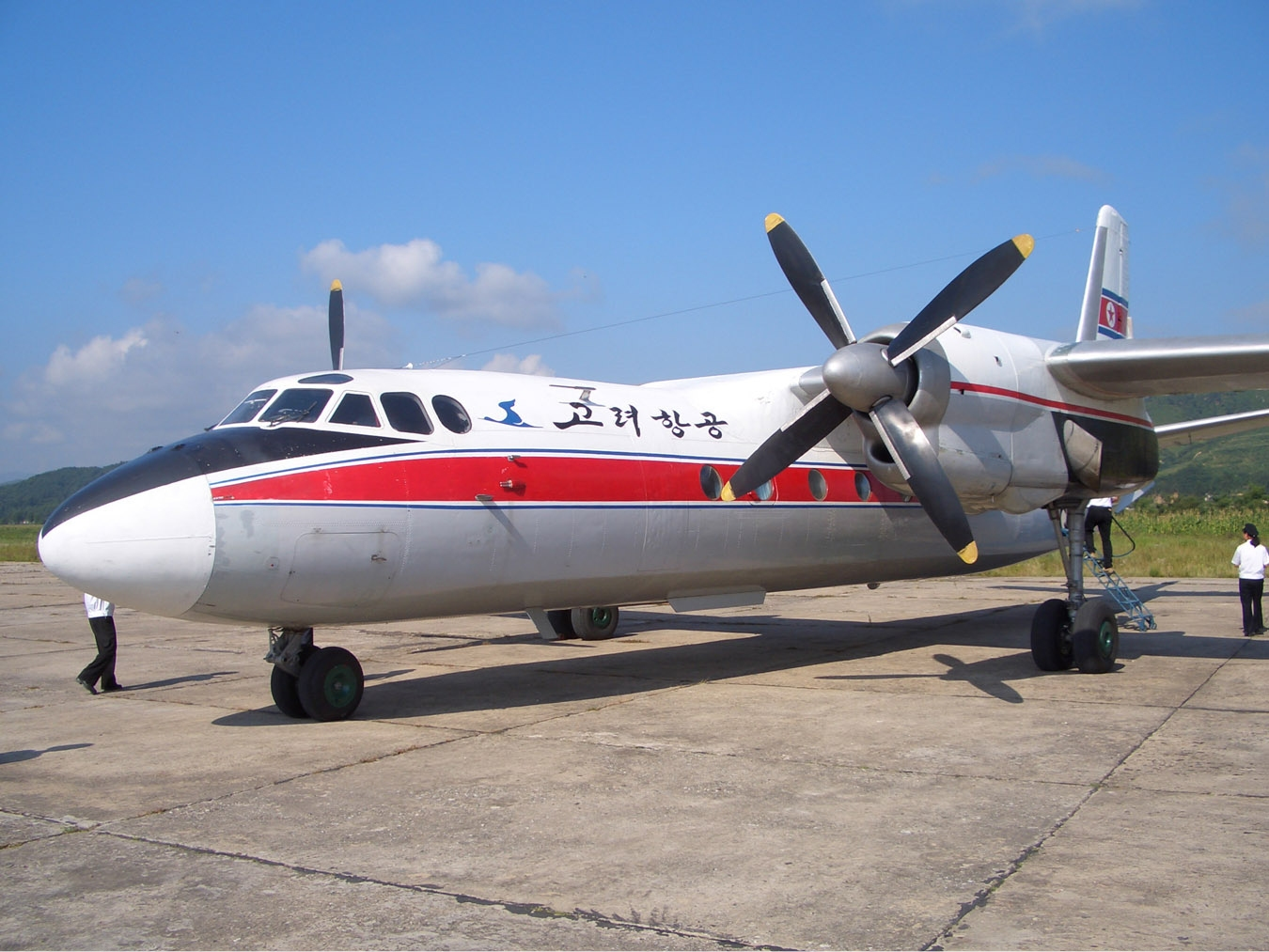
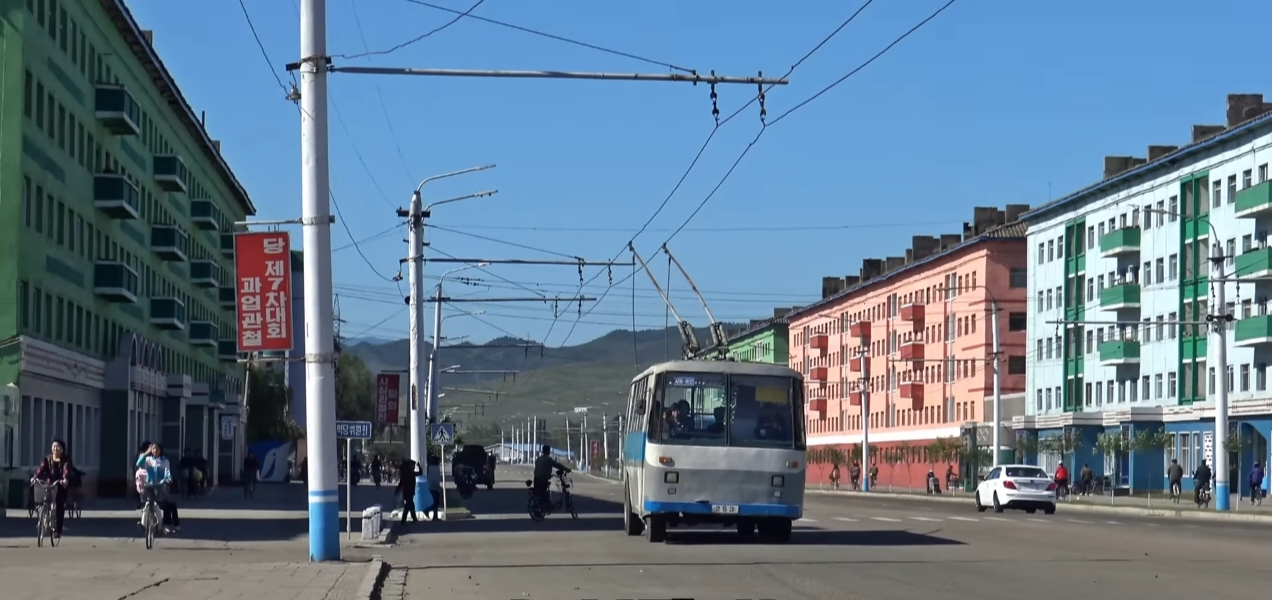
- Downtown Chongjin (in September 2011) Air Koryo Antonov An-24 aircraft at Chongjin Airport North Hamgyong Province E-Library Chongjin Trolleybus
- Nickname: City of Iron
- Interactive map of Chongjin
- Location in North Korea
- Coordinates: 41°46′01″N 129°43′24″E
- Country: North Korea
- Province: North Hamgyong
- Administrative divisions: 7 kuyok

Government
  - Chairman of the Chongjin City People’s Committee of North Hamgyong Province: Kang Jun

Area
  - Total: 269 km^{2} (104 sq mi)
- Elevation: 9.4 m (31 ft)

Population (2008)
  - Total: 627,000
  - Density: 2,330/km^{2} (6,000/sq mi)
  - Dialect: Hamgyong
- Time zone: UTC+09:00 (PYT)

Chongjin (Korean pronunciation: [tsʰʌŋ.dʑin]; Korean: 청진시; MR: Ch'ŏngjin-si) is the capital of North Korea's North Hamgyong Province. It is the third-largest city in the country, and an important port city on the northeastern coast. Originally a small fishing village, it industrialized significantly under Japanese rule and later under the North Korean government.

The city is a hub of trade and industry, despite having suffered heavily during the famine of the 1990s. Sometimes called the "City of Iron", Chongjin is one of North Korea's major industrial centers for steel and fiber. Chongjin also functions as a regional center of transport, culture, and education, and hosts foreign consulates from both China and Russia, a rarity in North Korea.

== History ==
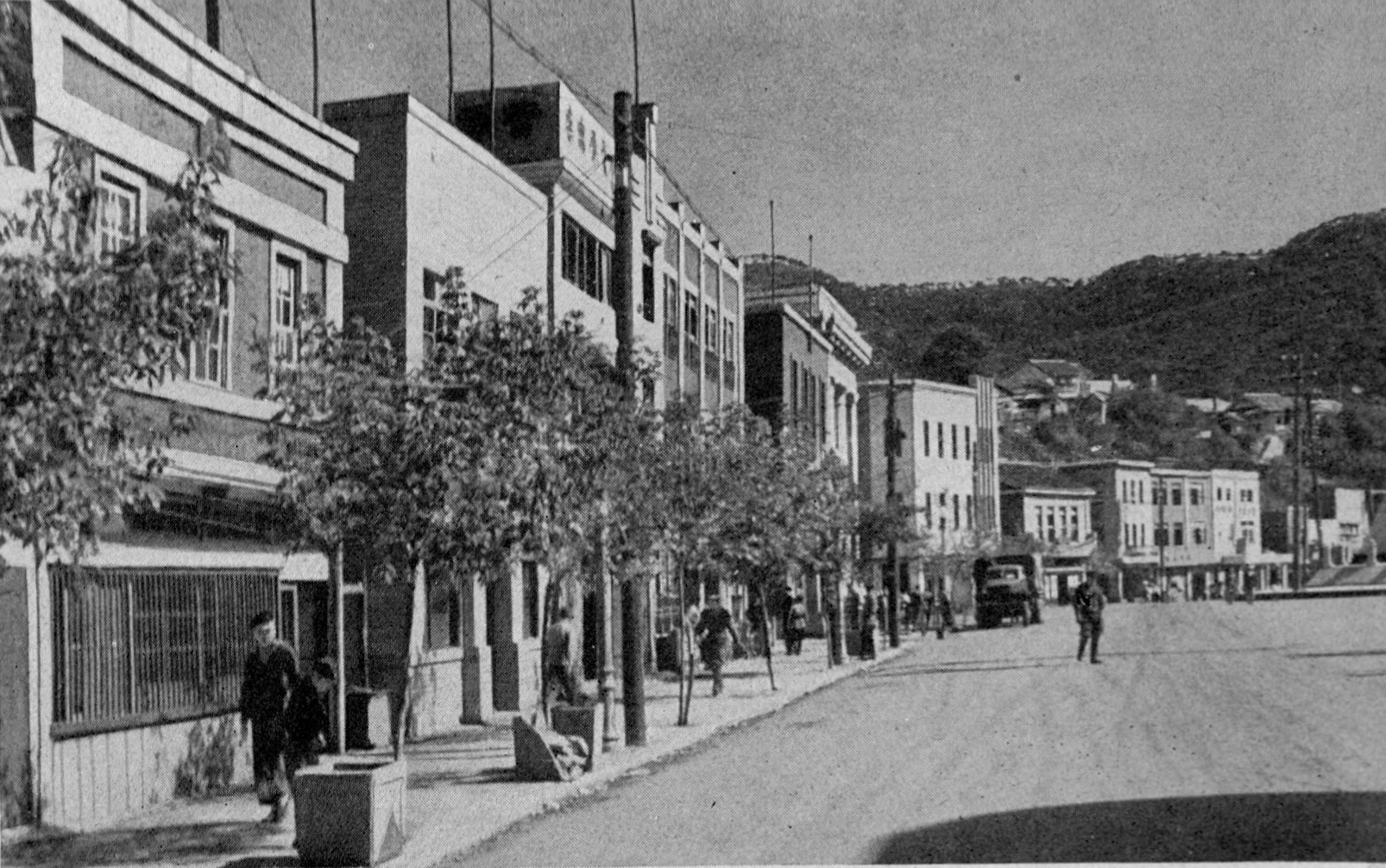
Main Street, September 1946

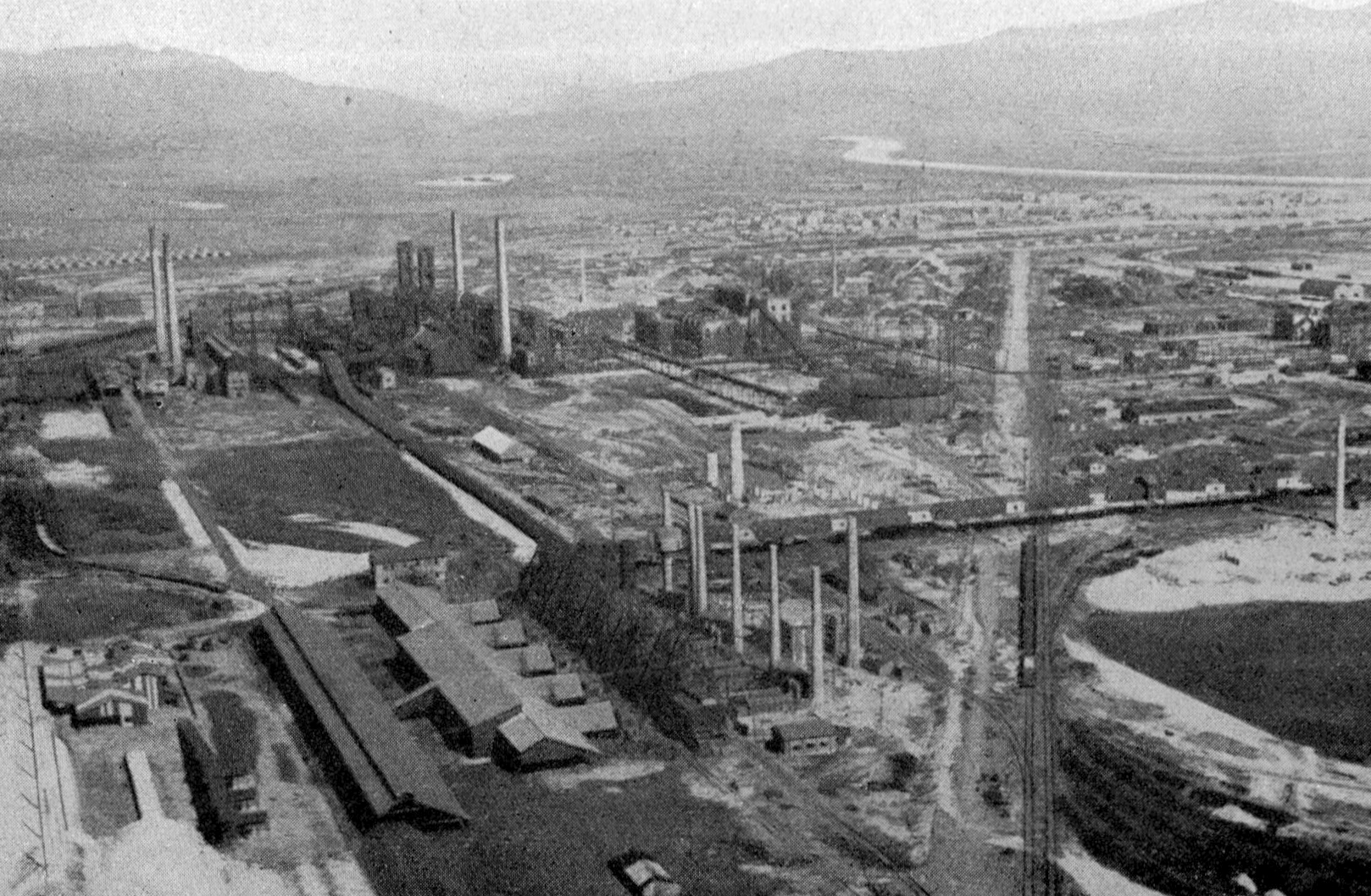
Aerial photograph of the industrial district, 1946

=== Prehistory ===
According to archaeological findings near the lower areas of the Tumen river, evidence of human living traces back to the Paleolithic period.

=== Ancient and medieval history ===
According to the Records of the Grand Historian, the region was where the tribe kingdoms of Buyeo, Mohe, Okjeo, Yilou, Yemaek and Sushen existed. The region later was the territory of Goguryeo. After the fall of Goguryeo in 668, the region was ruled by the Tang dynasty. During the reign of Balhae, the region was under the subdivision Donggyeongyongwonbu. The region was under the rule of the Jin dynasty and Yuan dynasty after the fall of Balhae by the Khitans.

=== Modern history ===
Emblem of Seishinfu(chongjin bu), administrative division Chongjin fell under Japanese rule

Chongjin was a small fishing village prior to the Japanese annexation of Korea; its date of establishment is unknown. The Chinese characters for its name mean 'clear river crossing'. During the Russo-Japanese War of 1904–1905, Japanese forces landed at Chongjin and established a supply base due to its proximity to the front lines in Manchuria. The Japanese remained after the end of the war, and in 1908, declared the city an open trading port both for the transport of Korean resources and as a stopping point for resources from China. The city was known during this period as “Seishin”, after the Japanese pronunciation of the Chinese characters for its name. The Imperial Japanese Army’s 19th Division was headquartered in Ranam from 1918, where the Japanese built a new planned city based on a rectangular street grid. In 1930, Nippon Steel built a large steel mill, the Seishin Iron and Steel Works, in the town. Ranam was annexed to Chongjin in 1940, which was elevated to city status. The Soviet Red Army overran the city after brief resistance on 13 August 1945, only two days before the end of World War II. Under the rule of North Korea, Chongjin remained an important military and industrial centre. It was directly administered by the central government from 1960–1967 and from 1977–1988.

In April 1969, a Lockheed EC-121M Super Constellation of the US Navy (135749) was shot down by two North Korean MiG-17 fighters SE of Chongjin over the Sea of Japan. All 31 occupants were killed, making it the deadliest plane crash in North Korean territory. The plane was on a military flight out of Atsugi NAS.

During the North Korean famine of the 1990s, Chongjin was one of the worst affected locations in the country; death rates may have been as high as 20%. Conditions there remain poor in terms of food availability. This problem has caused several instances of civil unrest in Chongjin, a rarity in North Korea. On 4 March 2008, a crowd of women merchants protested in response to tightened market controls. Rising grain prices and government attempts to prohibit "peddling in the market" have been cited as causes for the protests. As a result of the protest, the Chongjin local government "posted a proclamation allowing peddling in the market." On 24 August 2008, a clash occurred between foot patrol agents and female merchants, which escalated into a "massive protest rally". It was reported that the Chongjin local government issued verbal instructions relaxing the enforcement activity until the time of the next grain ration.

On May 21, 2025, a newly developed Korean People's Navy destroyer suffered a major accident in a side launch manoeuvre during an event in the Port of Chongjin. Kim Jong-un declared that criminal acts resulted in the incident. A chief engineer and 2 shipyard officials were arrested in connection with the incident. According to analysts from the Center for Strategic and International Studies, the Chongjin port only had experience in producing smaller vessels such as cargo ships and fishing boats, which likely made it ill-suited for launching a warship.

== Administrative divisions ==
From 1948 to 1960, 1967 to 1977, and 1987 to the present, Ch'ŏngjin was governed as a part of North Hamgyong Province. From 1960 until 1967, and again from 1977 to 1987, Chongjin was administered as a directly governed city.

Ch'ŏngjin is divided into seven wards (구역, kuyŏk, Korean pronunciation: [kujʌk]).

- Ch'ŏngam-guyŏk (청암구역, [tɕʰʌŋam ɡujʌk])
- P'ohang-guyŏk (포항구역, [pʰohaŋ ɡujʌk])
- Puyun-guyŏk (부윤구역, [pujun ɡujʌk])
- Ranam-guyŏk (라남구역, [ɾanam ɡujʌk])
- Sinam-guyŏk (신암구역, [ɕʰinam ɡujʌk])
- Songp'yŏng-guyŏk (송평구역, [sʰoŋpʰjʌŋ ɡujʌk])
- Sunam-guyŏk (수남구역, [sʰunam ɡujʌk])

== Geography ==
Coast village near Chongjin (in 2015)

Chongjin is located in the northeast of North Korea, in North Hamgyong Province, near the East Korea Bay (Kyŏngsŏng Bay) in the Sea of Japan. The Susong River (수성천) runs through the city; contained in the city are the Sodu Stream (서두수) and Mount Komal (고말산).

=== Climate ===
Chongjin has a humid continental climate (Köppen climate classification: Dwa, bordering on Dwb) with cold, dry winters and warm, rainy summers.

Climate data for Chongjin (1991–2020 normals, extremes 1957–present)
Month	Jan	Feb	Mar	Apr	May	Jun	Jul	Aug	Sep	Oct	Nov	Dec	Year
Record high °C (°F)	9.3 (48.7)	12.2 (54.0)	22.3 (72.1)	31.8 (89.2)	34.5 (94.1)	33.4 (92.1)	36.1 (97.0)	33.8 (92.8)	34.0 (93.2)	27.2 (81.0)	20.5 (68.9)	14.3 (57.7)	36.1 (97.0)
Mean daily maximum °C (°F)	−0.4 (31.3)	1.5 (34.7)	6.4 (43.5)	12.7 (54.9)	17.0 (62.6)	20.4 (68.7)	24.0 (75.2)	25.6 (78.1)	22.6 (72.7)	16.8 (62.2)	8.5 (47.3)	1.9 (35.4)	13.1 (55.6)
Daily mean °C (°F)	−4.7 (23.5)	−3.0 (26.6)	1.9 (35.4)	7.7 (45.9)	12.1 (53.8)	16.3 (61.3)	20.6 (69.1)	22.1 (71.8)	18.0 (64.4)	11.7 (53.1)	3.8 (38.8)	−2.5 (27.5)	8.7 (47.7)
Mean daily minimum °C (°F)	−8.8 (16.2)	−7.2 (19.0)	−2.2 (28.0)	3.4 (38.1)	8.4 (47.1)	13.4 (56.1)	18.0 (64.4)	19.1 (66.4)	13.6 (56.5)	6.6 (43.9)	−0.5 (31.1)	−6.5 (20.3)	4.8 (40.6)
Record low °C (°F)	−22.2 (−8.0)	−19.0 (−2.2)	−16.1 (3.0)	−6.0 (21.2)	0.0 (32.0)	5.0 (41.0)	8.6 (47.5)	9.4 (48.9)	2.4 (36.3)	−6.0 (21.2)	−15.0 (5.0)	−20.0 (−4.0)	−22.2 (−8.0)
Average precipitation mm (inches)	12.2 (0.48)	7.4 (0.29)	15.1 (0.59)	29.6 (1.17)	64.7 (2.55)	73.8 (2.91)	126.7 (4.99)	126.1 (4.96)	79.8 (3.14)	34.0 (1.34)	29.2 (1.15)	15.3 (0.60)	613.9 (24.17)
Average precipitation days (≥ 0.1 mm)	4.0	2.6	3.1	4.2	8.4	9.8	11.6	10.5	6.3	3.5	4.0	4.4	72.4
Average snowy days	8.0	4.9	3.9	0.9	0.1	0.0	0.0	0.0	0.0	0.1	3.3	7.5	28.7
Average relative humidity (%)	61.6	61.9	62.8	65.7	75.4	83.7	87.2	84.2	75.8	67.2	63.0	59.9	70.7
Source 1: Korea Meteorological Administration
Source 2: Pogoda.ru.net (extremes)

== Economy ==
Chongjin is one of the DPRK's important steel and fiber industry centers. It has a shipyard, a locomotive plant, and a rubber factory. Near the port area are the Chongjin Steel Co., Chemical Textile Co., May 10 Coal Mine Machinery Factory, and Kimchaek Iron & Steel (which was built by Nippon Steel under Japanese rule); however industrial activities in the city have been severely handicapped due to a lack of resources. Despite this, however, Chongjin is estimated to have a 24 percent share of the DPRK's foreign trade and is home to a resident Chinese consul who serves Chinese merchants and businesspersons operating in the northeast of the country. Chongjin also contains Sunam Market, an example of market economics in North Korea.

Because of the heavy concentration of industries in the area, Chongjin is also the DPRK's air pollution black spot. With the collapse of the Soviet Union and the subsequent shortage of oil to generate electricity, many factories have been shuttered. One of the first senior U.N. officials permitted to visit the area, Tun Myat, observed in 1997 when the North Korea economic crisis reached its peak, "Chongjin was like a forest of scrap metal, with huge plants that seem to go on for miles and miles that have been turned into rust buckets. I've been all over the world, and I've never seen anything quite like this."

Chongjin Bus Factory, established in 1981, supplies a large number of buses and trolleybuses to Chongjin. It also builds the trams used within Chongjin, including one articulated tram. In recent years, the factory has built more trolleybuses that visually resemble the Chollima-321 of the Trolleybuses in Pyongyang.

The city is powered by the Chongjin Thermal Power Plant. The coal used by the power plant is allegedly mined in Kwan-li-so No.22, although since then the prison has apparently been closed. The plant has an estimated generation capacity of 150 MW.

=== Other industries ===
- Chosun Clothing Factory – makes Vinalon cloth into uniforms
- North Hamgyong Provincial Broadcasting Company
- Majon Deer Company – makes medicine from deer antlers
- Second Metal Construction Company
- Onpho Hot Springs
- Soenggiryong mines – kaolin mine
- North Hamgyong Provincial E-Business Institute

The area has little arable land, so the famine in the 1990s hit the residents of Chongjin particularly hard. During the late 1990s, the city's residents experienced some of the highest death rates from famine, which might have been as high as 20 percent of the population. By 1995, the local frog population was wiped out due to overhunting.

=== Prisons ===
- In Chongjin political prison camp (Kwan-li-so No. 25), a large prison complex in Susong-dong (northern part of Chongjin), more than 3,000 political prisoners are allegedly forced to manufacture bicycles and other consumer goods.
- Chongori reeducation camp (Kyo-hwa-so No. 12) is located halfway between Chongjin and Hoeryong.
- The Nongpo Detention Center, which was built during the Japanese occupation, is still in use but under new management.

=== Shipping ===
Chongjin's port has established itself as a critical component of busy international shipping trade with neighbouring parts of Northeast and Southeast Asia. Of DPRK's eight international shipping ports, Chongjin is thought to be the second most economically important (after Nampho port on the west coast) and serves as a base of trade to Russia and Japan. Chongjin also boasts a seamen's club which serves to cater for foreign crews as well as a meeting base for North Koreans and foreigners engaged in the shipping trade.

The People's Republic of China and Russia have set up their consulates in Chongjin. It is unique for a North Korean city to have a foreign consulate. Chongjin is the administrative centre of the North Hamgyong Province.

== Transport ==
=== Air ===
Orang Airport located in Orang County, 40 kilometres from Chongjin, is equipped with a 2,500 m (8,200 ft) runway on a military and civilian dual purpose air station (CHO). North Korea planned to upgrade an old airport near Hamhung as late as 2003, so that it would have a 4,000 m (13,000 ft) runway, and would act as the nation's second international airport. However, it is still not completed.

=== Rail ===
The Wonson-Rason Railway and Chongjin-Rason Railway (Pyongra Line) electric railways operated by the Korean State Railway connect Rason and the capital Pyongyang.

=== Urban transit ===
Chongjin is the only city in North Korea other than Pyongyang and Wonsan to operate a tram system. These trams are all locally manufactured. It consists of one line built in two phases, phase 1,6 km (3.7 mi), and phase 2,7 km (4.3 mi). It has a turning loop in Pongchon and Namchongjin, with the depot located in Sabong.

A trolleybus system also operates with 3 lines: Chongam - Yokchon, Hae'an - Sabong and Namchongijn - Ranam.

== Education ==
Kindergarten in Chongjin (in 2014)

=== Universities and colleges ===
There are several state-run higher educational facilities located here, such as:

- Chongjin University of Technology
- Chongjin Mine University
- Chongjin University of Education No. 1 (Oh Jungheup University)
- University of Education No. 2
- Hambuk University It used to be called Hambuk Agricultural University until 1993.
- Chongjin University of Medicine
- Chongjin College of Light Industry
- Chongjin College of Metal Engineering
- Chongjin College of Automation Engineering

The Kim Jong-suk Teachers' College, which was named after Kim Jong Il's mother, Kim Jong-suk, is in Chongjin.

=== Schools ===
Schools for gifted and talented students include:

- Chongjin No.1 Senior Middle School: One of science high schools for gifted students in North Korea.
- Chongjin School of Foreign Languages
- Chongjin School of Arts

== Culture ==
There is an aquatic product research center. Famous scenic sites include hot springs and Mt. Chilbo. Chongjin's most famous product is processed squid. The city is home to the football team, the Ch'ŏngjin Chandongcha.

The local newspaper is the Hambuk Daily.

Chongjin is featured in the book Nothing to Envy: Ordinary Lives in North Korea by Barbara Demick.

=== Other cultural locations ===
North Hamgyong Province E-Library

- North Hamgyong Province Theater (함경북도 극장)
- Chonmasan Hotel for foreign visitors to stay at, built to convey the power of the government over the individual; in 1997, a French aid worker from Action contre la Faim was allowed to stay there but was not let out of the hotel to observe the famine conditions.
- Pohanng Square has a 25-foot bronze statue and the Revolutionary History Museum
- Inmin Daehakseup Dang (Grand People's Study House)
- Chongjin Children's Palace (청진학생소년궁전): Artistic talented students do extracurricular activities here after school.
- North Hamgyong Province E-Library

== Sister cities ==
Chongjin has two sister cities:

- Changchun, China
- Jilin, China

== Notable people from Chongjin ==
- Jang Song-thaek, North Korean politician and uncle of Kim Jong Un, current leader of North Korea
- Kim Swoo-geun, South Korean architect
- Kim Yik-yung, South Korean ceramic artist
- Pak Chang-sik, North Korean politician
- Ri Sol-ju, the First Lady of North Korea and the wife of North Korean Supreme Leader Kim Jong Un.
- Ri Ul-sol, North Korean Marshal and politician
- Shin Sang-ok, South Korean film producer and director

== Historic gallery ==
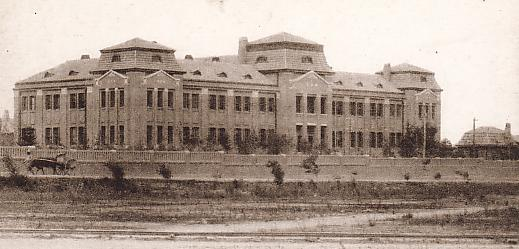
North Hamgyong Provincial Office during the Japanese colonial era

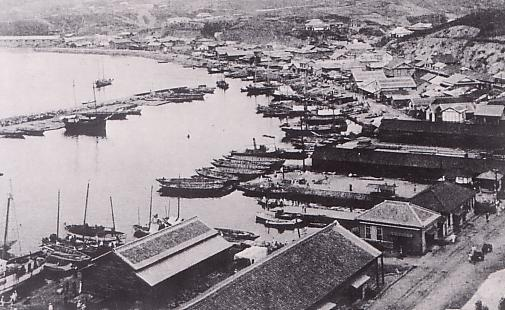
Port of Chongjin during the Japanese colonial era

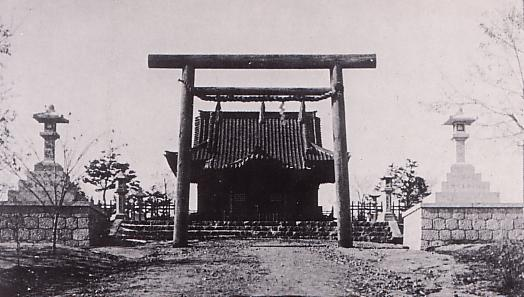
Ranam Shinto Shrine during the Japanese colonial era

== See also ==
- List of cities in North Korea
- Geography of North Korea
