= List of cities in North Korea =

Ten most populous cities of North Korea

The important cities of North Korea have self-governing status equivalent to that of provinces. Pyongyang, the largest city and capital, is classified as a chikhalsi (capital city), while three cities (see the list below) are classified as t'ŭkpyŏlsi (special city). Other cities are classified as si (city) and are under provincial jurisdiction, at the same level as counties (see Administrative divisions of North Korea).

== List ==
Notes

- All population figures come from the 2008 North Korean census.
- Several former special cities have been re-merged with their provinces, including Chongjin, Hamhung and Kaesong.
- Rason was annexed into North Hamgyong Province in 2004, but was later promoted back to special city in 2010 to help manage it for foreign investment.
- Chosŏn'gŭl has replaced Hancha; Hancha has not been officially used in North Korea since the 1950s.

Name	Korean		No.
Name	Chosŏn'gŭl	Hancha	No.
direct-administered city	직할시	直轄市	1
special city	특별시	特別市	3
special-level city	특급시	特級市	0
city	시	市	25

City	Chosŏn'gŭl	Hancha	Province	Population (2008)	Founded
Anju	안주시	安州市	South Pyongan	240,117	1987-08-
Chongjin	청진시	淸津市	North Hamgyong	667,929	1985- -
Chongju	정주시	定州市	North Pyongan	189,742	1994- -
Haeju	해주시	海州市	South Hwanghae	273,300	1945-09-02
Hamhung	함흥시	咸興市	South Hamgyong	768,551	1967- -
Hoeryong	회령시	會寧市	North Hamgyong	153,532	1991-07-08
Huichon	희천시	熙川市	Chagang	168,180	1967- -
Hyesan	혜산시	惠山市	Ryanggang	192,680	1954-10-
Kaechon	개천시	价川市	South Pyongan	319,554	1990-08-
Kaesong	개성특별시	開城特別市	none	308,440	2019-02-28
Kanggye	강계시	江界市	Chagang	251,971	1949-01-
Kimchaek	김책시	金策市	North Hamgyong	207,299	1953- -
Kusong	구성시	龜城市	North Pyongan	196,515	1967-10-
Manpo	만포시	滿浦市	Chagang	116,760	1961-10-
Munchon	문천시	文川市	Kangwon	122,934	1991-05-
Nampo	남포특별시	南浦特別市	none	366,341	2011-02-15
Pyongsong	평성시	平城市	South Pyongan	284,386	1969- -
Pyongyang	평양직할시	平壤直轄市	none	3,255,288	1946-09-
Rason	라선특별시	羅先特別市	none	196,954	2010-01-05
Sariwon	사리원시	沙里院市	North Hwanghae	307,764	1947- -
Samjiyon	삼지연시	三池淵市	Ryanggang	31,471	2019-12-10
Sinpo	신포시	新浦市	South Hamgyong	152,759	1960- -
Sinuiju	신의주시	新義州市	North Pyongan	359,341	1947- -
Songrim	송림시	松林市	North Hwanghae	128,831	1947- -
Sunchon	순천시	順川市	South Pyongan	297,317	1983-10-
Tokchon	덕천시	德川市	South Pyongan	237,133	1986-06-
Tanchon	단천시	端川市	South Hamgyong	345,876	1983- -
Wonsan	원산시	元山市	Kangwon	363,127	1946-09-

(Note: foundation dates are the dates the cities were legally founded as their current status by the North Korean government. They all existed as prior settlements before these dates.)

== See also ==
- Administrative divisions of North Korea
- Special cities of North Korea
- List of cities in South Korea
- Geography of North Korea
