= Provinces of North Korea =

First-level administrative divisions of North Korea

Provinces of the Democratic People's Republic of Korea
- Category: Unitary state
- Location: North Korea
- Number: 9
- Populations: 719,269 (Ryanggang Province) – 4,051,696 (South Pyongan)
- Areas: 11,255 km^{2} (4,346 sq mi) (Kangwon) – 18,970 km^{2} (7,320 sq mi) (South Hamgyong) – 28,955 km^{2} (11,180 sq mi) (Kangwon including ROK controlled-parts)
- Government: Communist state
- Subdivisions: City, County

Provinces (Korean: 도; Hanja: 道; RR: do; MR: to) are the first level of division within North Korea. There are nine provinces in North Korea: Chagang, North Hamgyong, South Hamgyong, North Hwanghae, South Hwanghae, Kangwon, North Pyongan, South Pyongan, and Ryanggang.

Unlike in decentralized states, the provinces of North Korea are not autonomous local governments and merely act as administrative arms of the central government, responsible for implementing directives from the Supreme People's Assembly, the Cabinet and ultimately the Workers' Party of Korea (WPK).

== History ==
Although the details of local administration have changed dramatically over time, the basic outline of the current three-tiered system was implemented under the reign of Gojong in 1895. A similar system also remains in use in South Korea.

Provinces (Korean: 도; Hancha: 道) are the highest-ranked administrative divisions in North Korea. Provinces have equal status to the special cities.

== List of provinces ==
The populations listed for each province are from the 2008 North Korea Census. From this census, an additional 702,372 people are living in military camps.

Name	Chosŏn'gŭl	Hancha	ISO	Population	Area (km^{2})	Density (/km^{2})	Capital	Region
Chagang	자강도	慈江道	KP-04	1,299,830	16,765	77.5	Kanggye	Kwanso
North Hamgyong	함경북도	咸鏡北道	KP-09	2,327,362	15,980	145.6	Chongjin	Kwanbuk
South Hamgyong	함경남도	咸鏡南道	KP-08	3,066,013	18,534	165.4	Hamhung	Kwannam
North Hwanghae	황해북도	黃海北道	KP-06	2,113,672	8,153.7	259.2	Sariwon	Haeso
South Hwanghae	황해남도	黃海南道	KP-05	2,310,485	8,450.3	273.4	Haeju	Haeso
Kangwon	강원도	江原道	KP-07	1,477,582	11,091	133.2	Wonsan	Kwandong
North Pyongan	평안북도	平安北道	KP-03	2,728,662	12,680.3	215.2	Sinuiju	Kwanso
South Pyongan	평안남도	平安南道	KP-02	4,051,696	11,890.6	340.7	Pyongsong	Kwanso
Ryanggang	량강도	兩江道	KP-10	719,269	13,880	51.8	Hyesan	Kwannam

== Claimed provinces ==
North Korea historically claimed seven provinces on the territory controlled by South Korea. These provinces were based on the divisions of the Japanese era, but corresponded somewhat to the present South Korean provinces and the special cities partitioned out of them, owing to the alterations in the provincial division affected by South Korea being more conservative relatively to those affected by the north. People's committees for these claimed provinces were elected in 1950 during the Korean War, when much of South Korea was under the DPRK's control.

Since the late 1950s, North Korea had a government-in-exile for South Korean administrative divisions similar to its South Korean counterpart. These were initially composed of South Korean defectors to the North who survived the post-war purges of 1953-1960, but their descendants later took over gradually as the initial defectors died out; an analogous situation is the Taiwan delegation to the PRC National People's Congress, which was likewise initially composed of Taiwanese communists but later replaced with their descendants in Mainland China. These individuals, who were to assume office after South Korea's "liberation", also generally served in other offices within North Korea at various levels. Top offices, such as the WPK Secretary of Seoul (though not the chairman of the Seoul City People's Committee, which was reserved for a southerner or a descendant of southerners), were reserved for people born in North Korea. These titular officials have access to documents about the South Korean city, town or county they are supposedly responsible for, and are sent to training camps once a year where they are given lectures about the current situation in South Korea. The status of this government-in-exile after North Korea's abandonment of peaceful reunification is unknown; however, since the new policy does not exclude the possibility of reunification by armed force, these officials could still be appointed as military governors were South Korea to be conquered by the North (as they were expected to assume office this way even before the abandonment of peaceful reunification).

As part of leader Kim Jong Un's declaration that deemed peaceful unification unfeasible with South Korea, the North Korean constitution was amended in 2024 to redefine the Republic of Korea — now recognising its existence, but without establishing bilateral relations — as its 'primary enemy state' (적대국); relinquishing its claim to the said areas, but at the same time vowed to reclaim the South through "nuclear force". However, the full copy of its updated constitution, which may include exact articles or amendments related to territorial changes, has yet to be released for international audiences to further substantiate the North's recent actions. On 23 March 2026, the Constitution was amended by the first session of the 15th Supreme People's Assembly, with the new amendments stating that North Korea's territory "includes the territory bordering the People's Republic of China and the Russian Federation to the north, and the Republic of Korea to the south, as well as the territorial seas and airspace established thereon".

Historical province	Name	Chosŏn'gŭl	Hancha	Capital	Equivalent South Korean provinces
Ch'ungch'ŏng	North Ch'ungch'ŏng	충청북도	忠淸北道	Ch'ŏngju	North Chungcheong Province
Ch'ungch'ŏng	North Ch'ungch'ŏng	충청북도	忠淸北道	Ch'ŏngju	Sejong Special Self-Governing City (part)
Ch'ungch'ŏng	South Ch'ungch'ŏng	충청남도	忠淸南道	Taejŏn	South Chungcheong Province
Ch'ungch'ŏng	South Ch'ungch'ŏng	충청남도	忠淸南道	Taejŏn	Daejeon Metropolitan City
Ch'ungch'ŏng	South Ch'ungch'ŏng	충청남도	忠淸南道	Taejŏn	Sejong Special Self-Governing City (part)
Kyŏnggi	Kyŏnggi	경기도	京畿道	Sŏul	Gyeonggi Province (except parts of Pocheon and Yeoncheon County)
Kyŏnggi	Kyŏnggi	경기도	京畿道	Sŏul	Seoul Special City
Kyŏnggi	Kyŏnggi	경기도	京畿道	Sŏul	Incheon Metropolitan City
Kyŏngsang	North Kyŏngsang	경상북도	慶尙北道	Taegu	North Gyeongsang (except Uljin County)
Kyŏngsang	North Kyŏngsang	경상북도	慶尙北道	Taegu	Daegu Metropolitan City
Kyŏngsang	South Kyŏngsang	경상남도	慶尙南道	Pusan	South Gyeongsang Province
Kyŏngsang	South Kyŏngsang	경상남도	慶尙南道	Pusan	Busan Metropolitan City
Kyŏngsang	South Kyŏngsang	경상남도	慶尙南道	Pusan	Ulsan Metropolitan City
Chŏlla	North Chŏlla	전라북도	全羅北道	Chŏnju	North Jeolla Province
Chŏlla	South Chŏlla	전라남도	全羅南道	Kwangju	South Jeolla Province
Chŏlla	South Chŏlla	전라남도	全羅南道	Kwangju	Jeju Special Self-Governing Province
Chŏlla	South Chŏlla	전라남도	全羅南道	Kwangju	Gwangju Metropolitan City

== See also ==
- Administrative divisions of North Korea
- Provinces of South Korea
- Special cities of North Korea
