= Kwanbuk =

Historical region now in North Korea

Kwanbuk 관북 · 關北
- Region of Korea
- Etymology: "North of the Ridge"
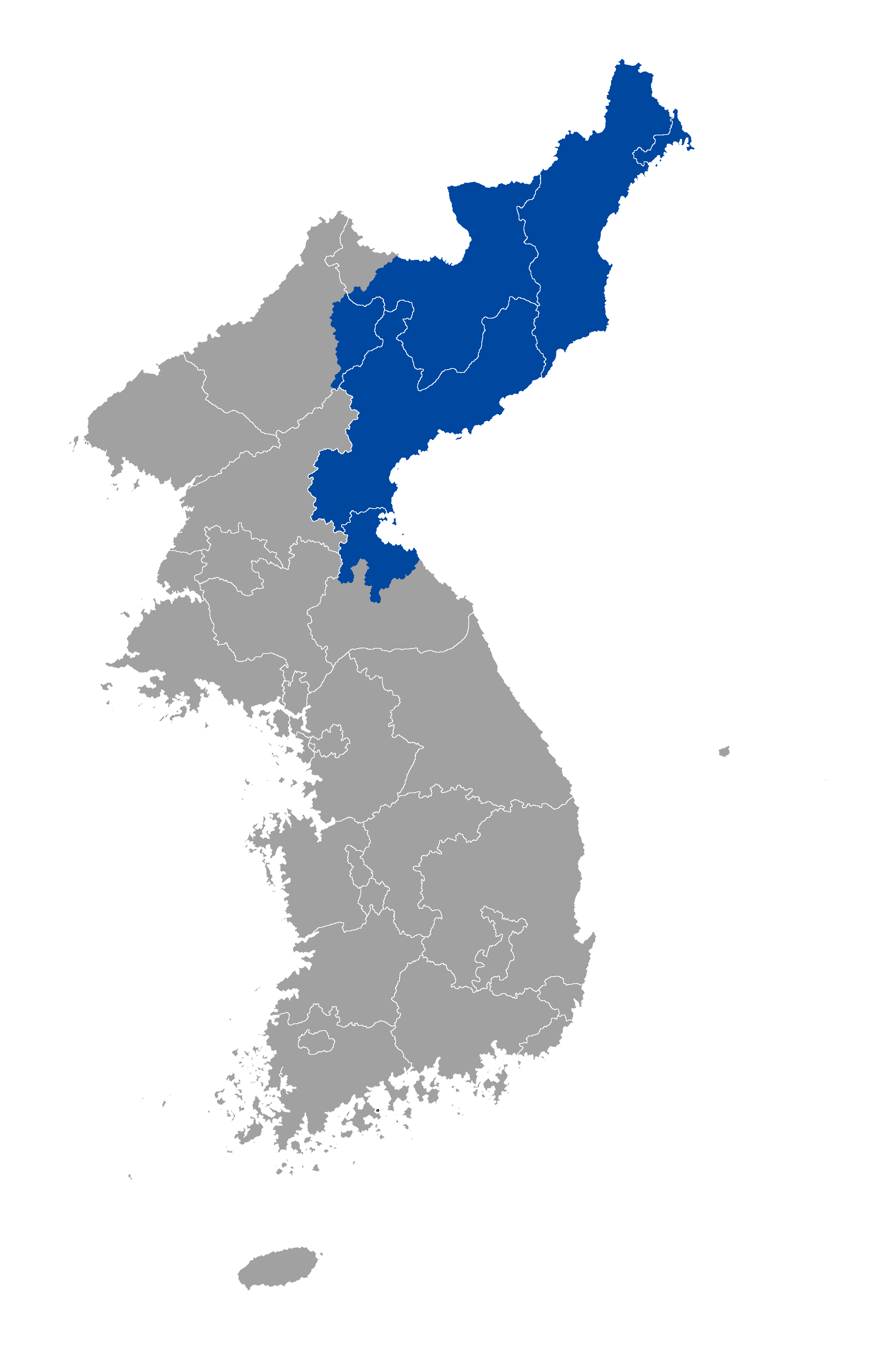
- Kwanbuk marked in blue in northeast Korea
- Country: North Korea; South Korea (claimed)
- Dialects: Hamgyŏng, Ryukchin (문화어)

- Kwanbuk
- Hangul: 관북
- Hanja: 關北
- RR: Gwanbuk
- MR: Kwanbuk

Kwanbuk, or Gwanbuk (Korean: 관북), is a region of Korea now comprising the northeast provinces of Ryanggang, North Hamgyong, South Hamgyong, and the Rajin-Sonbong Special Economic Zone. It borders the Kwansŏ region to the west and the Kwandong region to the south, and faces the Sea of Japan to the east.

Its name, Kwanbuk, means "North of the Ridge". The ridge in question is the Machon mountain range (Hanja: 摩天嶺; North Korean (Munhwa'ŏ): 마천령 machŏnryŏng; South Korean (Pyojuneo): 마천영 macheonyeong). Machŏnryŏng is a part of the greater Hamgyong mountain range that runs through northeast Korea.

Kwanbuk can further be divided into another subregion, Kwannam (關南/관남, gwannam), which demarcates South Hamgyong from the rest of the region.

In modern times, the name has fallen out of use in most parts of Korea.

== History ==
=== Koryŏ ===
In the latter half of the 11th Century during the reign of Sŏnjong of Koryŏ, the administrative divisions of medieval Korea were being reorganized. During that time, the area that is now Gyeonggi Province was called Gwannae-do (關內道/관내도), so it is believed that Kwanbuk given its name in reference not only to the Machon mountain range, but also the region position north to Gyeonggi.

=== Chosŏn and Korean Empire periods (1392-1910) ===
The Chosŏn Dynasty (1392–1897), and later the Korean Empire (1897–1910), ruled the entirety of the Korean Peninsula for nearly five and a half centuries. During the latter half of the Koryo Dynasty, Kwanbuk was administered as Tonggye (東界/동계) from Hamju-mok (咸洲木/함주목). In the early days of the Choson Dynasty, the province was referred to as Hamgil-do (咸吉道/함길도), then briefly Yeonggil-do (永吉道/영길도) and Yeongan-do (永安道/영안도), before receiving its current name, Hamgyŏng-do (咸鏡道/함경도), by taking the first syllable from the names of the provinces two principal cities: Hamhung (咸興/함흥) and Kyongsong (鏡城/경성). Hamhung served as the provincial capital.

Under the rule of the Choson monarchs, Koreans from the northern provinces, Pyŏngan and Hamgyŏng, faced extreme discrimination, such as being subject to heavier taxation, compared to the rest of the country, as well as being prohibited from taking the civil service examination (과거 kwagŏ). In 1895, King Gojong divided the original Eight Provinces into twenty-three districts. Hamgyong Province was divided into three districts, or bu (府/부): Kyŏngsŏng-bu (鏡城府/경성부), Kapsan-bu (甲山府/갑산부), and Hamhŭng-bu (咸興府/함흥부). One year later, the twenty-three districts were reorganized into eighteen provinces. Kyongsong and Kapsan districts were reorganized into North Hamgyong Province, while Hamhung-bu was reorganized into South Hamgyong Province.

=== Japanese occupation (1910-1945) ===
Korea was annexed into the Empire of Japan in 1910, with its internal borders being rearranged once again. North Hamgyong and South Hamgyong provinces were rearranged into Kankyōhoku-dō and Kankyōnan-dō, with Seishin (Chongjin) and Kankō (Hamhung) as their respective provincial capitals.

Due to their proximity to Manchukuo, the northern provinces (North and South Heian and North and South Kankyō) the region was heavily industrialized.

=== Contemporary period (1945-present) ===
Following the Japanese surrender in September 1945, Korea regained its independence after thirty-five years under Japanese rule. The People's Republic of Korea, a provisional government, was founded shortly thereafter. The provisional republic remained a sovereign, independent state for several days, until the United States and Soviet Union devised a plan to temporary partition Korea into two occupied zones, then reunify the peninsula once it was determined that the Koreans were fit to govern themselves.

Korea was divided at thirty-eight degrees north (38th parallel), which divided Korea roughly in half. The entirety of the Korean northeast fell under the jurisdiction of the Soviet Civil Administration, the zone of Korea north of the 38th parallel. The Democratic People's Republic of Korea (North Korea) was established in 1948, and made changes to its internal borders shortly thereafter, such as demarcation of several counties in South Hamgyong Province to be conjoined with a majority of North Pyŏngan, to create Chagang Province. Ryanggang Province, known as Yanggang-do (양강도) in South Korea, was created in 1954 by demarcating the northernmost land from South Hamgyong and northwestern part of North Hamgyong.

== Administrative divisions ==
Today, the Kwanbuk region comprises three do (道/도, province), one t'ŭkpyŏlsi (貼別市/특별시, special city), and one kyŏngjetŭkku (經濟貼別區/경제특구, special economic zone). However, due to the ongoing conflict between North and South Korea where both claim to be the sole legitimate Korean state and claim the entirety of the Korean Peninsula as their sovereign territory, the South Korean government does not formally recognize any changes made to the internal borders of North Korea, instead still recognizing the administrative divisions of northern Korea as they were from 1896 to 1945.

=== Administrative divisions according to the DPRK ===
Provinces (道/도)
Province	Hancha	Chosŏn'gŭl	RR	McCune-Reischauer	Abbreviation	Capital
North Hamgyong	咸鏡北道	함경북도	Hamgyeongbuk-do	Hamgyŏngbuk-do	Hambuk (咸北/함북)	Chŏngjin
South Hamgyong	咸鏡南道	함경남도	Hamgyeongnam-do	Hamgyŏngnam-do	Hamnam (咸南/함남)	Hamhŭng
Ryanggang	兩江道	량강도	Ryanggang-do	Ryanggang-do	N/A	Hyesan

Special Cities (經濟貼別區/경제특구)
Special City	Hancha	Chosŏn'gŭl	RR	McCune-Reischauer	Population
Rason	羅先貼別市	라선봉특별시	Raseon-teukbyeolsi	Rasŏn-t'ŭkpyŏlsi	205,000 (2019)

Special Economic Zones (經濟貼別區/경제특구)
Special Economic Zone	Hancha	Chosŏn'gŭl	RR	McCune-Reischauer
Rason	羅津先鋒經濟貼別區	라진선봉경제특구	Rajinseonbong-gyeongjeteukgu	Rajinsŏnbong-kyŏngjetŭkku

=== Administrative divisions according to the ROK ===
The Republic of Korea (South Korea) has a government body meant to govern the traditional provinces in northern Korea, excluding Kangwŏn, the Committee for the Five Northern Korean Provinces. The committee recognizes the provinces of North Pyongan, South Pyongan, North Hamgyong, South Hamgyong, and Hwanghae as they were between 1896 and 1945, and does not recognize changes made to these provinces by the North Korean government. The committee serves a ceremonial purpose.

Provinces according to the Committee for the Five Northern Korean Provinces
Map	Province	Capital	Governor
	North Hamgyeong	Cheongjin	Lee Hoon
	South Hamgyeong	Hamheung	Son Yang-young

== Culture ==
The northern regions of Korea have many cultural differences from the rest of Korea. North Korea as a whole still holds traditional Korean culture and values in high esteem, while South Korea, due to its open borders and global popularity, is undergoing globalization.

There are two dialects of Korean native to the region: the Northeast Dialect (東北 方言/동북 방언 tongbuk-pang'ŏn) and the Ryukchin Dialect (六鎭 方言/륙진 방언 ryukjin-pang'ŏn). The Northeast Dialect, also known as the Hamgyŏng dialect (咸鏡 方言/함경 방언), is the main variety of Korean spoken throughout the region. The Ryukchin dialect, also known as the Yukjin dialect (Pyojuneo: 육진 방언) or Nyuup-mal (뉴웁말), is a unique dialect of Korean spoken primarily by the Chaegasŭng, an ethnic group native to northern Korea near Tumen river who were descended from the Jurchens, Manchus and other Tungusic peoples. Since the 1950s, the Chaegasung have been forcibly assimilated into Korean culture and society.

=== List of cultural elements and phenomenons originating from Kwanbuk ===
- Raengmyŏn (冷面/랭면), known as Naengmyeon (냉면) in South Korea, is a cold noodle dish originating from Hamhung, South Hamgyong Province
- Gat Kimchi (갓김치), a variety of kimchi native to parts of North Pyongan and North and South Hamgyong
