= North Hamgyong Province =

Province of North Korea

Coordinates: 41.903°N 129.408°E

North Hamgyong Province 함경북도
- Province

Korean transcription(s)
  - Chosŏn'gŭl: 함경북도
  - Hancha: 咸鏡北道
  - McCune-Reischauer: Hamgyŏngbuk-to
  - Revised Romanization: Hamgyeongbuk-do
- Country: North Korea
- Region: Kwanbuk
- Capital: Chongjin
- Subdivisions: 3 cities; 12 counties

Government
  - Provincial Party Committee Chief Secretary: Kim Yong-hwan (politician) (WPK)
  - People's Committee Chairman: Park Myeong-ho

Area
  - Total: 20,345 km^{2} (7,855 sq mi)

Population (2008)
  - Total: 2,327,362
  - Density: 114.39/km^{2} (296.28/sq mi)
- Time zone: UTC+9 (Pyongyang Time)
- ISO 3166 code: KP-09
- Dialect: Hamgyong, Yukjin

North Hamgyong Province (Hamgyŏngbukdo, Korean pronunciation: [ham.ɡjʌŋ.buk̚.t͈o]) is the northernmost province of North Korea. The province was formed in 1896 from the northern half of the former Hamgyong Province.

== Geography ==
The province is bordered by China (Jilin) to the north, South Hamgyong to the southwest and Ryanggang to the west. To the east is the Sea of Japan. The province is home to the Musudan-ri rocket launching site and the Hoeryong concentration camp. In 2004, Rason was reabsorbed back into the province and since 2010, Rason has been a special city of North Korea.

== Economy ==
In critical studies of North Korea, North Hamgyong has a reputation as a neglected and underdeveloped region even by the country's standards. It was where the 1990s famine hit hardest, and food shortages persist even in the 2020s. The majority of North Korean defectors who live in South Korea came from the province after crossing the relatively shallow Tumen River into China. Therefore, the conditions of the province, which analyst Fyodor Tertitskiy has described as "not only a very grim, but also a very boring place," tend to be projected onto the whole country, even though they are not representative.

== Administrative divisions ==
North Hamgyong is divided into three cities (si) and 12 counties (kun). These are further divided into villages (ri) in rural areas and dong (neighborhoods) in cities. Some cities are also divided into wards known as "kuyŏk", which are administered just below the city level.

=== Cities ===
- Chongjin (Capital)
  청진시/清津市
- Hoeryong
  회령시/會寧市
- Kimchaek
  김책시/金策市

=== Counties ===
- Hwadae County
  화대군/花坮郡
- Kilju County
  길주군/吉州郡
- Kyonghung County
  경흥군/慶興郡
- Kyongsong County
  경성군/鏡城郡
- Kyongwon County
  경원군/慶源郡
- Musan County
  무산군/茂山郡
- Myongchon County
  명천군/明川郡
- Myonggan County
  명간군/明澗郡
- Onsong County
  온성군/穩城郡
- Orang County
  어랑군/漁郞郡
- Puryong County
  부령군/富寧郡
- Yonsa County
  연사군/延社郡

== In popular culture ==
- Cha Ki-seong (played by Kim Joo-hyuk), the main antagonist of the 2017 South Korean action comedy film Confidential Assignment is revealed to be a native of Hoeryong, one of the main cities of North Hamgyong Province.
- One of the main characters of Netflix's South Korean thriller series Squid Game, Kang Sae-byeok (played by Jung Ho-yeon) is a North Korean defector who is originally from North Hamgyong Province and lived there before defecting with her younger brother Kang Cheol to South Korea.

== See also ==
- Punggye-ri Nuclear Test Site
- 2006 North Korean nuclear test
- Administrative divisions of North Korea
