= Vanino railway station =

Railway station in Russia

Vanino Ванино
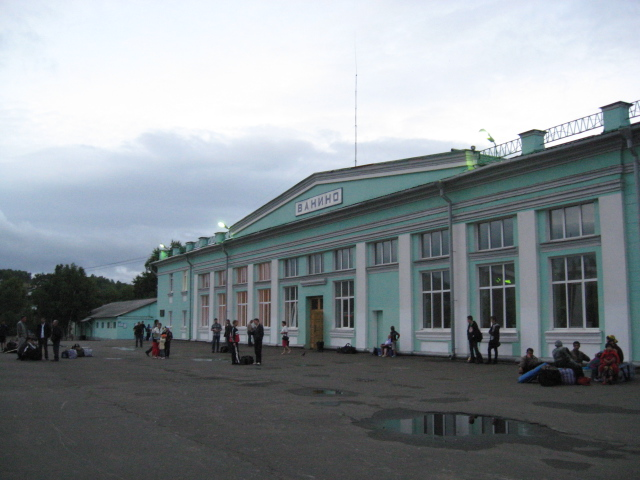
- Vanino railway station building

General information
- Location: Vanino, Khabarovsk Krai, Russia
- Coordinates: 49°5′23″N 140°16′1″E
- Owner: Russian Railways
- Platforms: 1
- Tracks: 2

Construction
- Structure type: At-grade

Other information
- Station code: 967600
- Fare zone: 0

History
- Opened: 1947

Services
| Preceding station | Russian Railways | Following station |
|---|---|---|
| Toki towards Tayshet | Baikal–Amur Mainline | Sovetskaya Gavan-Sortirovochny towards Sovetskaya Gavan |
| Preceding station | Sakhalin Shipping Company | Following station |
| Terminus | Vanino–Kholmsk train ferry | Kholmsk Terminus |
Location

Vanino railway station is a railway station in Vanino, Russia.

It includes the building of the railway station and the passenger platform. Tickets of Vanino-Kholmsk train ferry are sold in the station building.
