= Hongui Line =

Line of the North Korean State Railway

Hongŭi Line
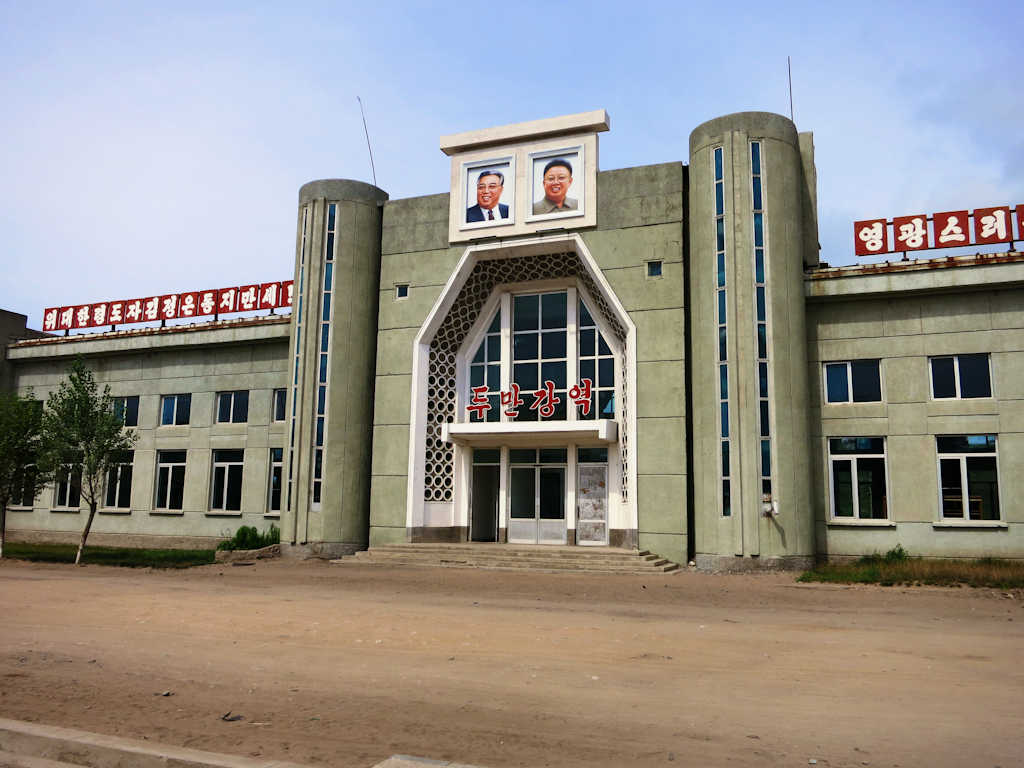
- Street-side view of Tumangang Station

Overview
- Native name: 홍의선 (洪儀線)
- Status: Operational
- Owner: Korean State Railway
- Locale: North Hamgyŏng
- Termini: Hongŭi; Tumangang
- Stations: 2

Service
- Type: Heavy rail, Passenger & freight rail Regional rail
- Operator: Korean State Railway
- Depot: Tumangang

History
- Opened: 1952

Technical
- Line length: 9.5 km (5.9 mi)
- Number of tracks: Double track
- Track gauge: Dual-gauge: 1,435 mm (4 ft 8 1/2 in); 1,520 mm (4 ft 11 27/32 in)
- Electrification: 3000 V DC Catenary
Route map
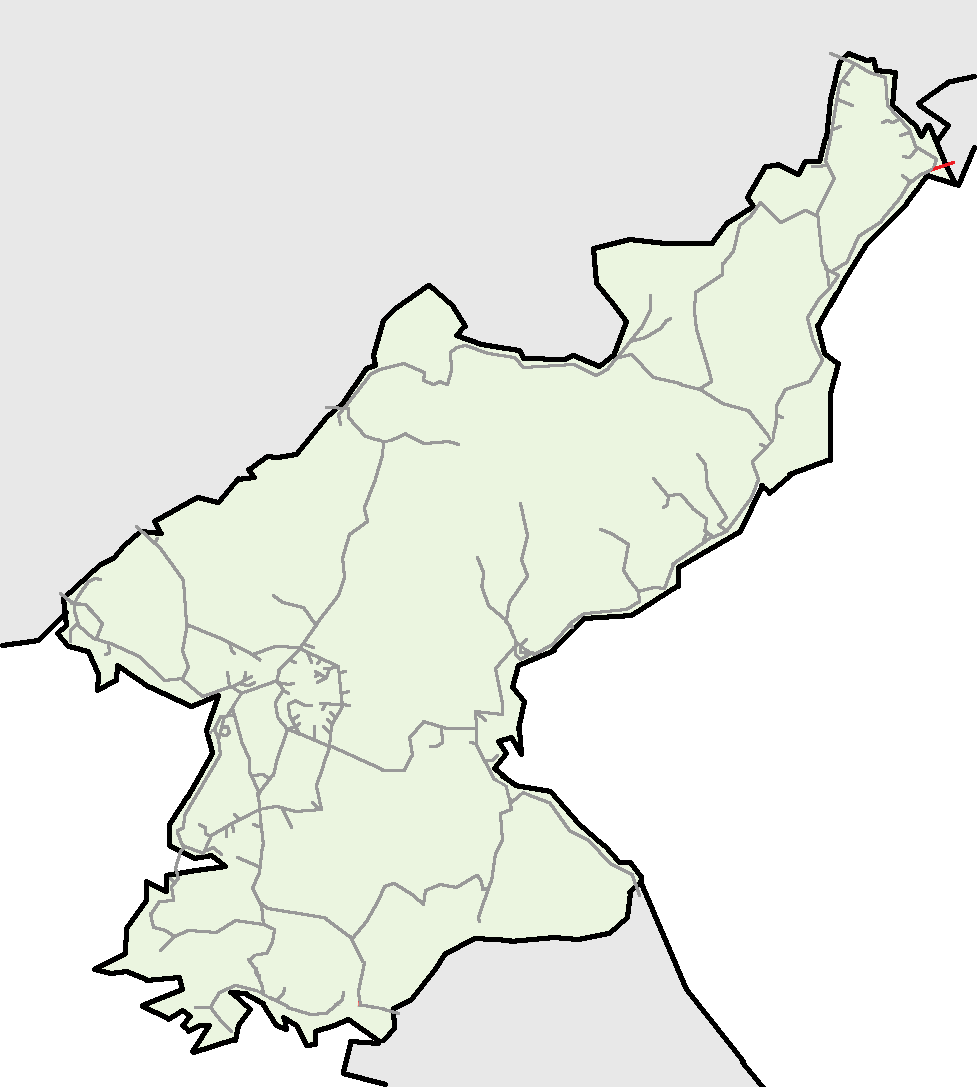
Key

- Hongui Line
- Hangul: 홍의선
- Hanja: 洪儀線
- RR: Honguiseon
- MR: Hongŭisŏn

The Hongŭi Line is an electrified standard-gauge secondary line of the North Korean State Railway running from Hongŭi on the Hambuk Line to Tumangang, which is the border station between North Korea and Russia. From Tumangang the line continues across the border to Khasan, Russia. The line from Tumangang to Rajin is double-tracked, including the entirety of the Hongŭi Line; during the recent renovation a 32 km section of dual Standard/Russian gauge was installed between Tumangang and Rajin stations. The entirety of the North Korean section of the line is located in Sŏnbong of Rasŏn Special City.

There are service facilities for locomotives and rolling stock at Tumangang Station.

== History ==
The line was built in the late 1940s, coinciding with the opening of a line on the Soviet Far Eastern Railway from Baranovsky to Khasan. The station at Khasan was opened on 28 September 1951, and in 1952 a wooden railway bridge was built across the Tumen River to Tumangang in North Korea. The Korean-Russian Friendship Bridge across the Tumen River was commissioned on 9 August 1959, replacing the temporary wooden bridge, which had grown to be insufficient for the traffic crossing the river.

== Services ==
=== Freight ===
Tumangang Station is the primary transit point for trade with Russia. The main imports from Russia are timber and crude oil; the main exports are magnesite, steel, fertiliser, non-ferrous metals and non-ferrous metal concentrates, but since the collapse of the Soviet Union freight traffic has dropped significantly.

However, with the renovation and conversion to dual Russian and standard gauge of the 32 km line between Tumangang and Rajin, which includes the entirety of this line, together with the redevelopment of Rajin's port facilities to serve as a gateway to the Trans-Eurasian railway linking Korea to Europe by land, freight traffic is expected to increase significantly in the future. The completion of these renovations has raised the capacity of the line to 12 trains each way per day, with a nominal capacity of 4 million tonnes a year.

=== Passenger ===
The international express train 7/8 that operates between P'yŏngyang and Moscow runs on this line between Hongŭi and Tumangang before crossing the border into Russia. There is also a long-distance service between Tumangang and Tanch'ŏn Ch'ŏngnyŏn station on the P'yŏngra Line.

Further, the Russian Railways operate trains 651/652 between Ussuriysk and Tumangang.

== Route ==
A yellow background in the "Distance" box indicates that section of the line is not electrified.

Distance (km)		Station Name		Former Name		
Total	S2S	Transcribed	Chosŏn'gŭl (Hanja)	Transcribed	Chosŏn'gŭl (Hanja)	Connections
0.0	0.0	Hongŭi	홍의 (洪儀)			Hambuk Line
1.0	1.0	Chŏkchi	적지 (赤池)			
6.49	5.49	Tumangang	두만강 (豆滿江)			
		Tumen River	두만강 (豆滿江)			DPRK−Russia border Korea Russia Friendship Bridge 조선 로씨야 우정의 다리 (Мост Дружбы)
11.41	4.92	Khasan, Russia	Хасан			Far Eastern Railway Baranovsky–Khasan line
