= Baranovsky–Khasan line =

Railway line in Russia

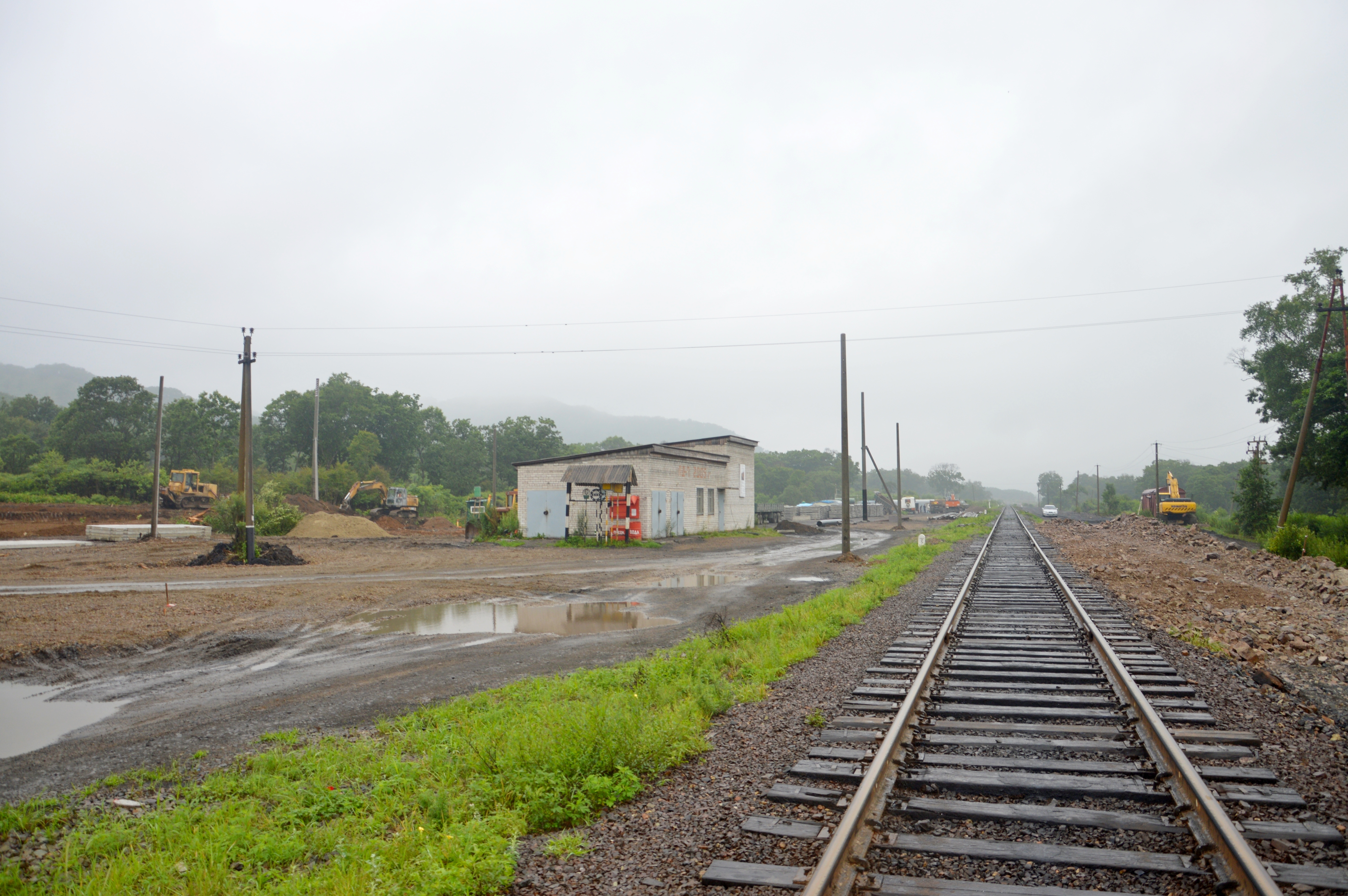
- Baranovsky–Khasan line in Primorsky Krai

Overview
- Other name: Vladivostok branch
- Native name: Железнодорожная линия Барановский — Хасан
- Status: Operational
- Owner: Russian Railways
- Locale: Eastern Russia
- Termini: Baranovsky; Khasan
- Stations: 13

Service
- Type: Heavy rail
- System: Far Eastern Railway
- Operator: Russian Railways

History
- Opened: 1941

Technical
- Line length: 240 km (150 mi)
- Number of tracks: 1
- Track gauge: 1,520 mm (4 ft 11 27/32 in) Russian gauge

The Baranovsky–Khasan line (Russian: Железнодорожная линия Барановский — Хасан) is about 240 km of Far Eastern Railway within Russian Railways. It leads from Trans-Siberian Railway in the south of Baranovsky along the coast of Pacific Ocean to the North Korean border in Khasan. Its continuation is the Tumangang Line. The route is mainly operated by regional trains that connect places along the route with Ussuriysk, where there is a connection with the Trans-Siberian Railway, or with the regional centers of Vladivostok and Khabarovsk.

== History ==
In 1938, the battle of Khasan from the Kwantung Army took place, and in 1941 the railway was built 190 km from the Siberian railway Baranovsky to Kraskino (now abolished). After the end of the World War II, it spread to the Khasan station near the mouth of Tumen River in 1951. In 1952, the bridge of the Tumen River was connected with the railway connection with DPRK. The bridge was also rebuilt in 1959, and is called the Korea Russia Friendship Bridge. Due to the low height of this bridge, it became an obstacle for the city of Hunchun in China to the Sea of Japan. After the Development Plan for the Tumen River, initiated by the United Nations Development Programme (UNDP), led by the Chinese proposal in the 1990s, the Chinese side consistently insisted on converting both railways to Russia and North Korea. But for political reasons, Russia and North Korea have not yet agreed. On October 13, 2011, the construction of a 54 km improvement project was completed from the border of both countries to the port of Rajin from 2009 to 2011, and the ceremony took place in 2013.

== Services ==
Every 14 days, the direct car of the formation of the Korean State Railway, attached to train No. 100, runs from Moscow to Pyongyang. The main passenger traffic consists of citizens of the DPRK, traveling to work in Russia or returning; in exceptional cases, some of the places are sold to organized groups of tourists traveling to Rason with a transfer to a bus in Tumangang.

== Gallery ==
Railway map of Baranovsky–Khasan line

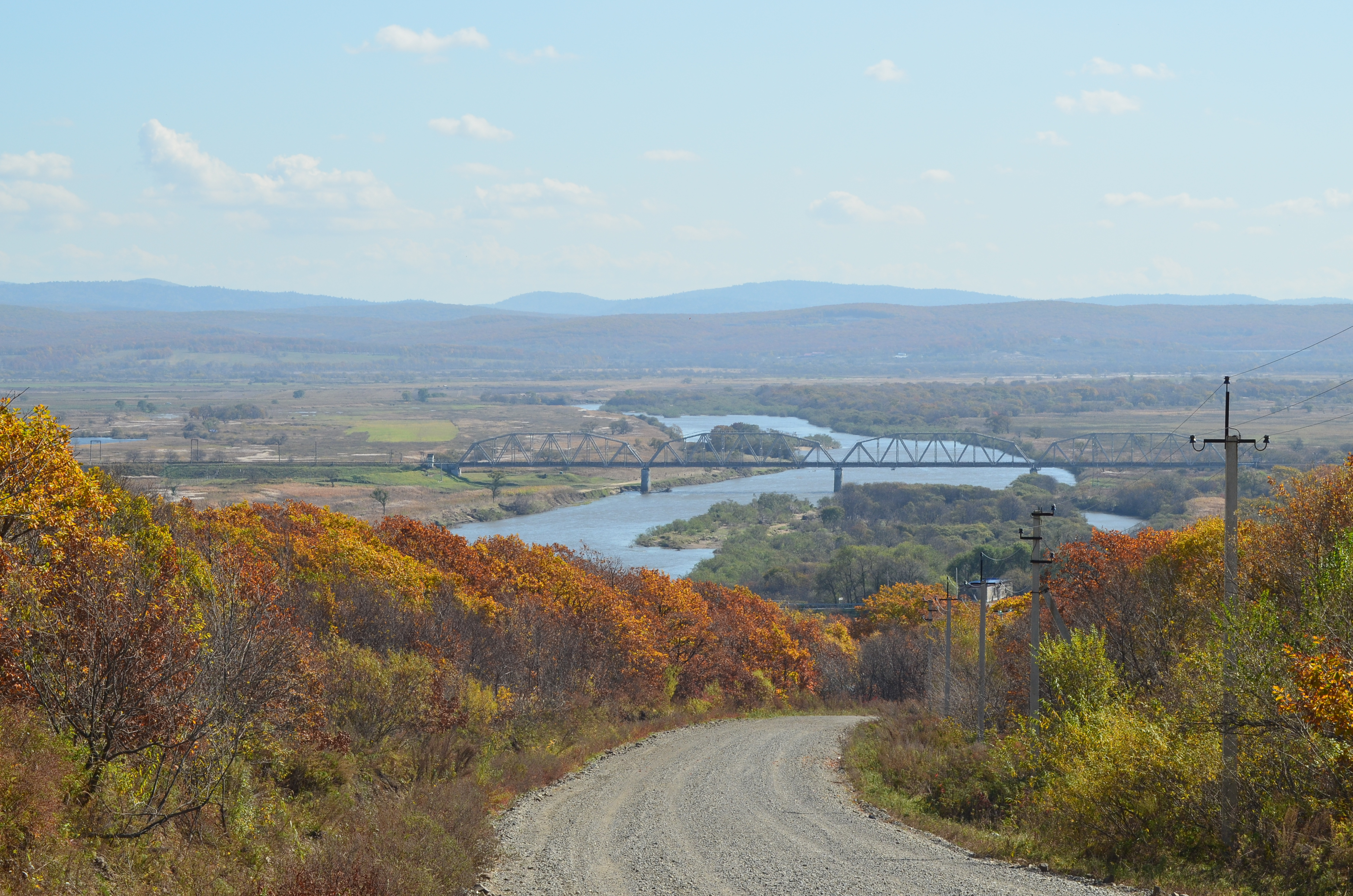
Railway Bridge on Razdolnaya River

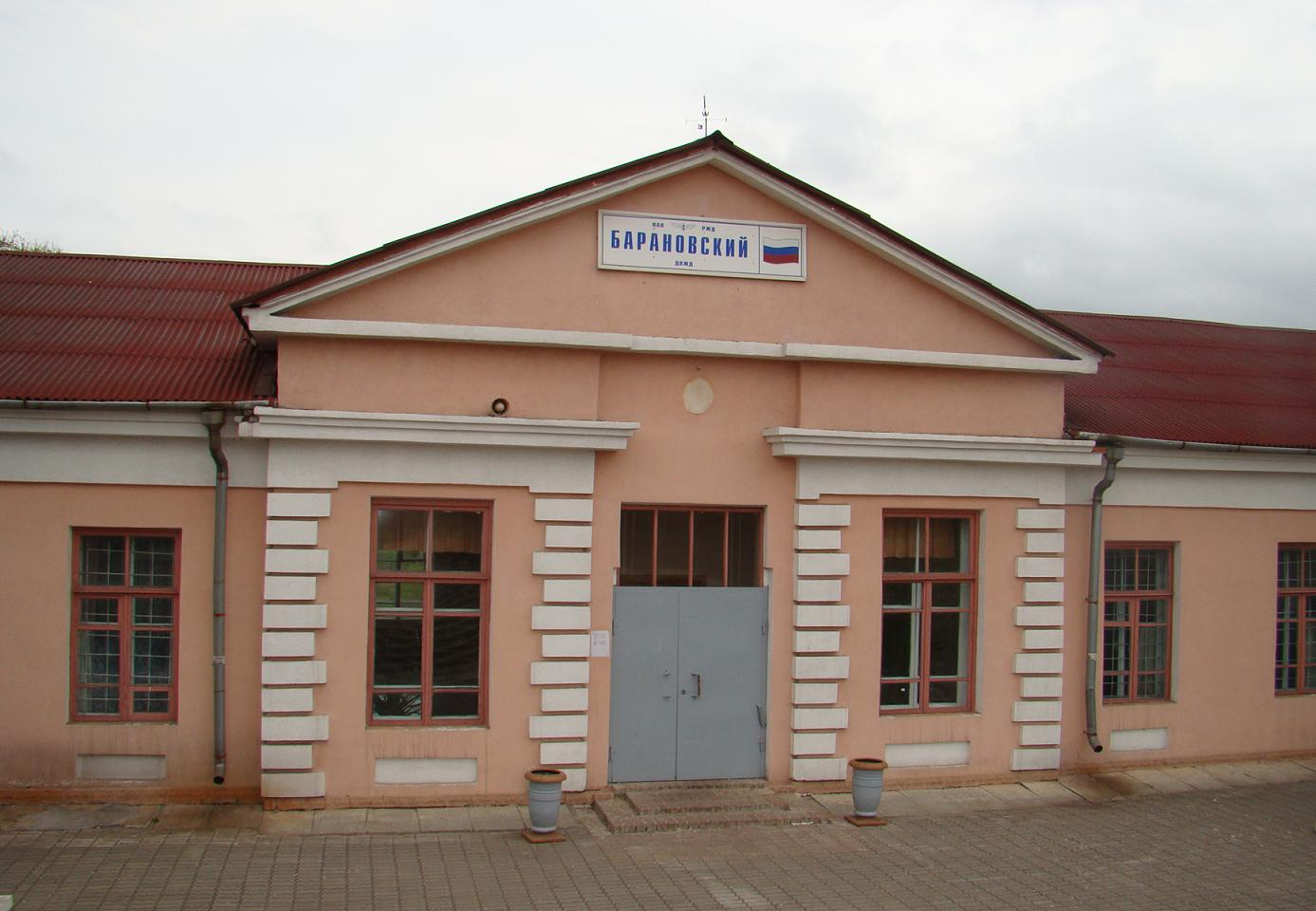
Baranovsky railway station

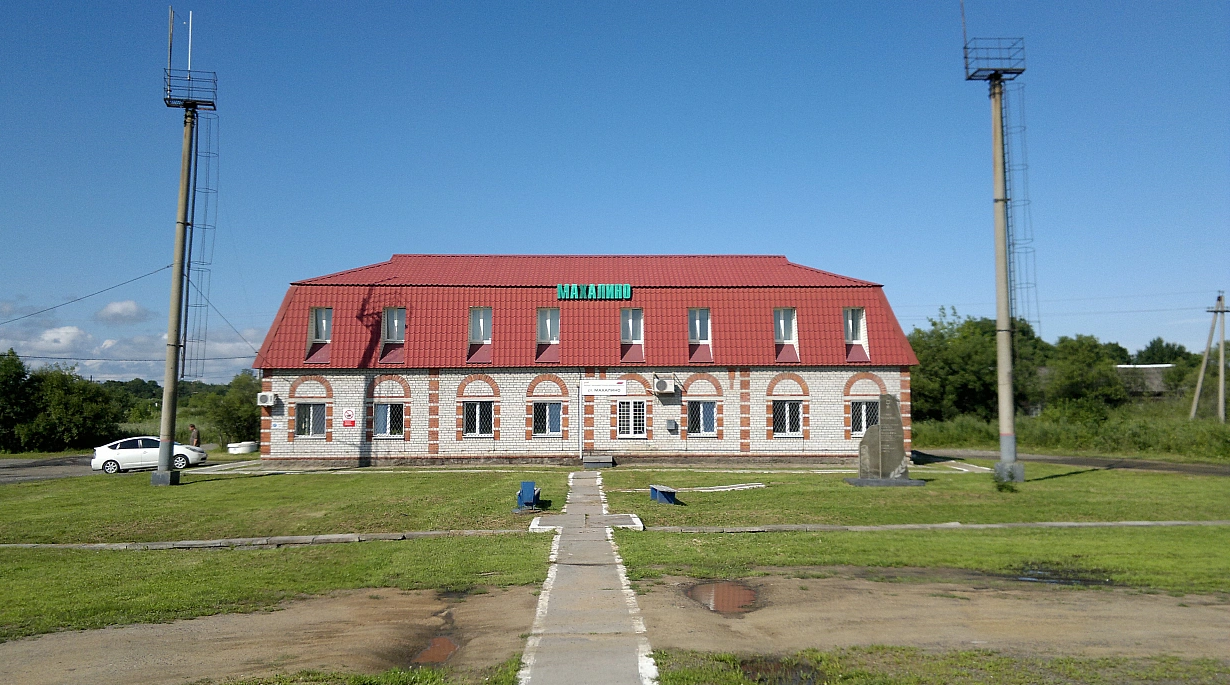
Makhalino railway station

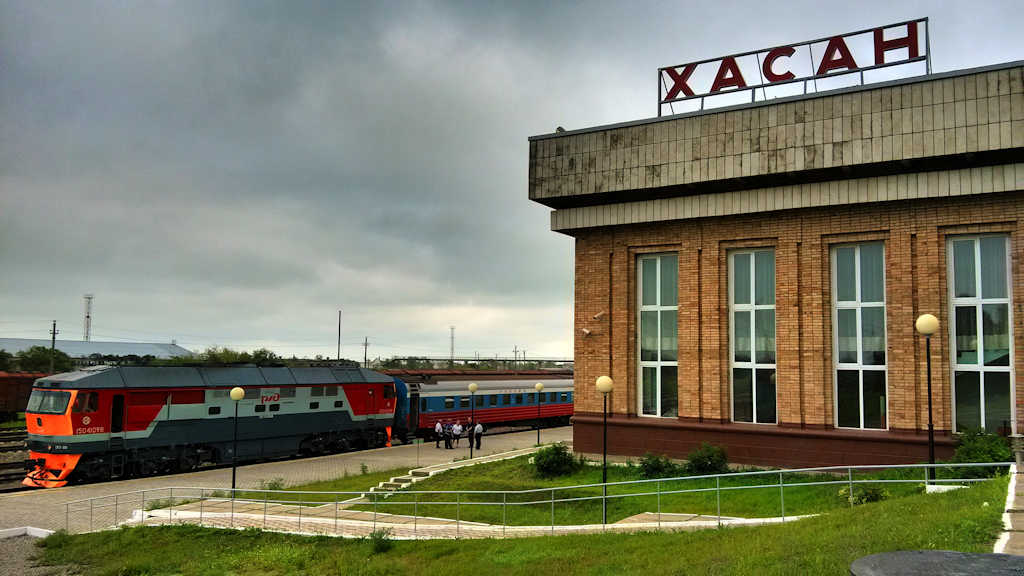
Khasan railway station

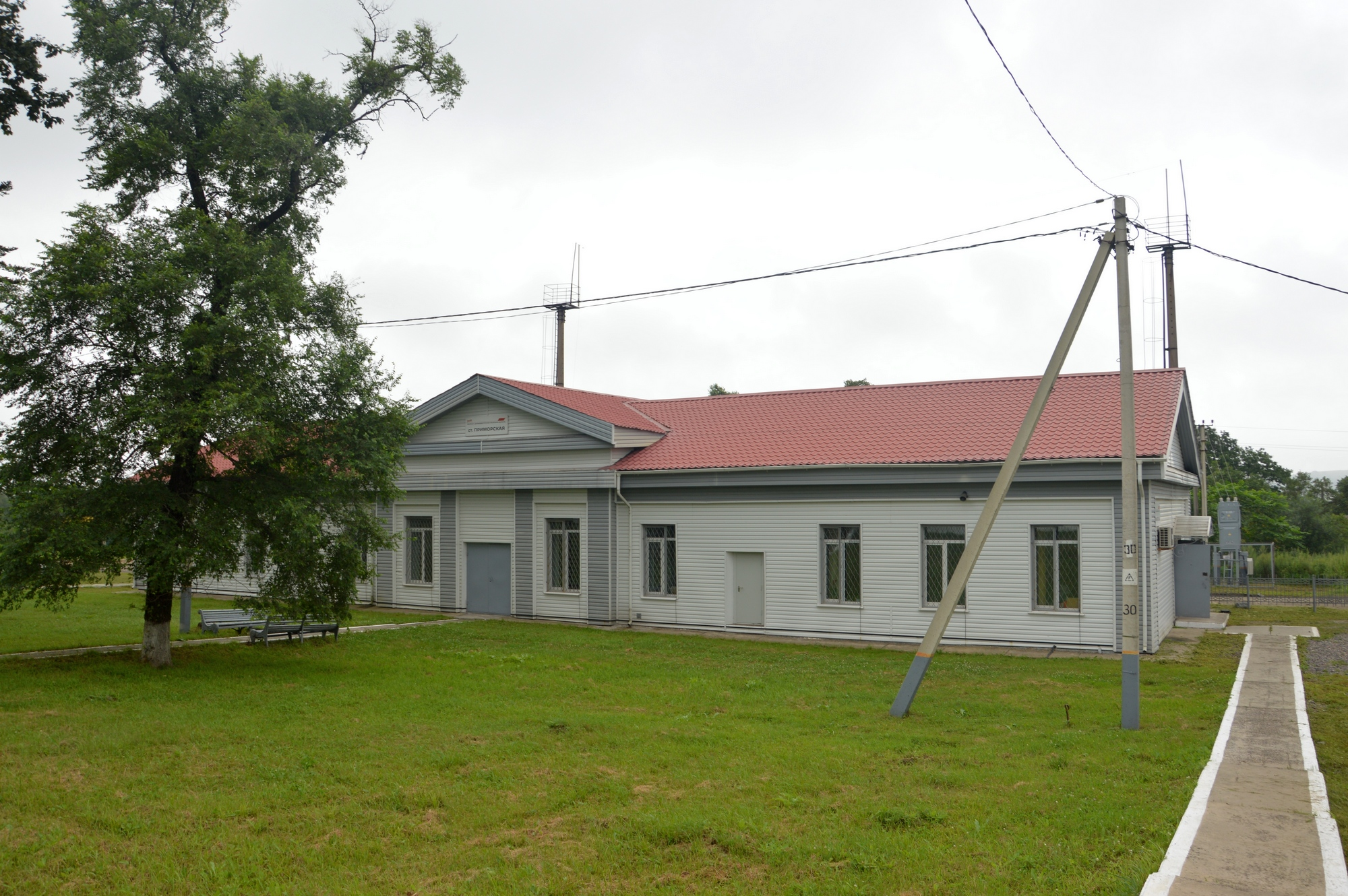
Primorsky railway station

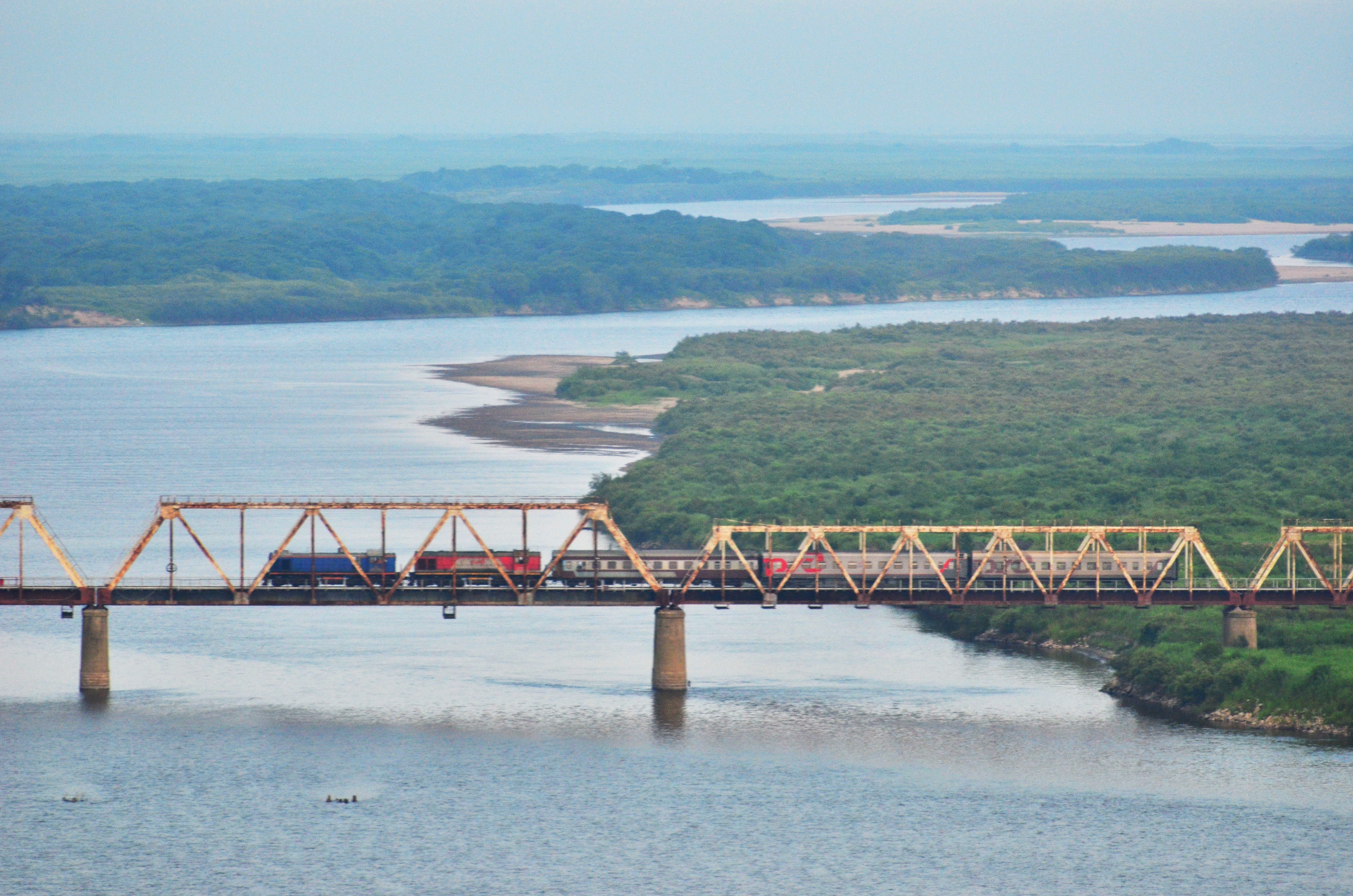
Korea–Russia Friendship Bridge where the line ends at the North Korean border

Railway line Baranovsky - Khasan, Baranovsky also has a branch to vladivosotk as part of the TSR

== See also ==
- North Korea–Russia border
- Korea–Russia Friendship Bridge
- Chinese Eastern Railway
