= Vanino =

Vanino (Russian: Ванино) is the name of several inhabited localities in Russia.

== Urban localities ==
- Vanino, Khabarovsk Krai, a work settlement in Vaninsky District of Khabarovsk Krai

== Rural localities ==
- Vanino, Kirov Oblast, a village in Afanasyevsky District of Kirov Oblast
- Vanino, Kursk Oblast, a selo in Medvensky District of Kursk Oblast
- Vanino, Pskov Oblast, a village in Palkinsky District of Pskov Oblast
- Vanino, name of several other rural localities

== See also ==
- Vaninsky
