= Okno-S =

Okno-S
- Окно-С
- Part of 821st Main Space Intelligence Centre
- Primorsky Krai, Russia

Site information
- Type: Space surveillance facility
- Owner: Russian Aerospace Forces
- Controlled by: Russian Space Forces
- Open to the public: No

Location
- Spassk-Dalny shown in Russia
- Coordinates: 44.6°N 132.82°E

Site history
- Built by: Soviet Union/Russia

Okno-S (Russian: Окно-С) (Note: "Окно" literally "window", stands for "Оптический контроль небесной области", "Optical control of the celestial region".) is a reported Russian military space surveillance facility used to identify and analyse the orbits of satellites and other space objects. If it is operational, it would be run by the Russian Space Forces and complement the Okno station in Tajikistan. Very little is known about the facility, including its precise location. There has been speculation on the differences between Okno and Okno-S but there has been no confirmation from official sources.

== Okno ==
Okno is described as an optical-electronic facility which uses telescopes to track satellites and spacecraft between 2,000 kilometres (1,200 mi) and 40,000 kilometres (25,000 mi) above the Earth. It is located at high altitude, 2,200 metres (7,200 ft) above sea-level near the civilian Sanglok astronomical observatory.

== Plans ==
Little is known about Okno-S. The project started at Krasnogorsk mechanical plant in 1980, under the direction of V S Chernova, and the initial design was completed in 1985. In 1989 Russian military contractor Vympel released a draft design of a number of space surveillance complexes including Okno-S.

One analyst, Sean O'Connor, says that the original plan was for four Okno installations and four Okno-S installations. This was later reduced to one in Ukraine and one in Eastern Russia. A report by Lenta.ru in 2004 said that one Okno-S was under construction.

== Location ==
Sources agree on the rough location of the site in Primorsky Krai in the Russian Far East. It is described as being on Gora Lysaya (Russian: гора Лысая) 'Bald Mountain' near Spassk-Dalny, north of Vladivostok.. A location estimated by Allen Thomson is 44.76°N 131.71°E but there are also two other mountains called Gora Lysaya closer to Vladivostok at 43°28′N 134°46′E and 44°49′N 135°28′E.. Panoramio photos in Google Earth show a Lysaya Gora at 44.380 N, 132.946 E, quite close to Spassk Dalny. Sean O'Connor states that the lack of good satellite photography is stopping open source intelligence researchers identifying the precise location.

== Facility ==
There is speculation on the differences between Okno and Okno-S and what the facility actually consists of. Sean O'Connor says that it only covers the region between 30,000 kilometres (19,000 mi) and 40,000 kilometres (25,000 mi) above the Earth, providing information on satellites in geostationary orbit. Something in the FAS sourcebook says that the site has two components. This says that equipment with the GRAU index 60Zh6 covers craft in higher orbits and 59Zh6 and 57Zh6 covers craft in lower orbit.. The whole facility is given the name Object 2327S.

== Other facilities ==
Primorsky Krai is mountainous and has other space and astronomical facilities. Krona-N, another military space surveillance facility is near Nakhodka at 42.93°N 132.57°E. Military unit 20096 obtains coordinates and reflecting features of space objects, and transmits this information to a unified system. A civilian solar observatory, Ussuriysk Astrophysical Observatory, is in Ussuriysk.
