= Khasan railway station =

Railway station in Khasansky District, Russia

Khasan Хасан
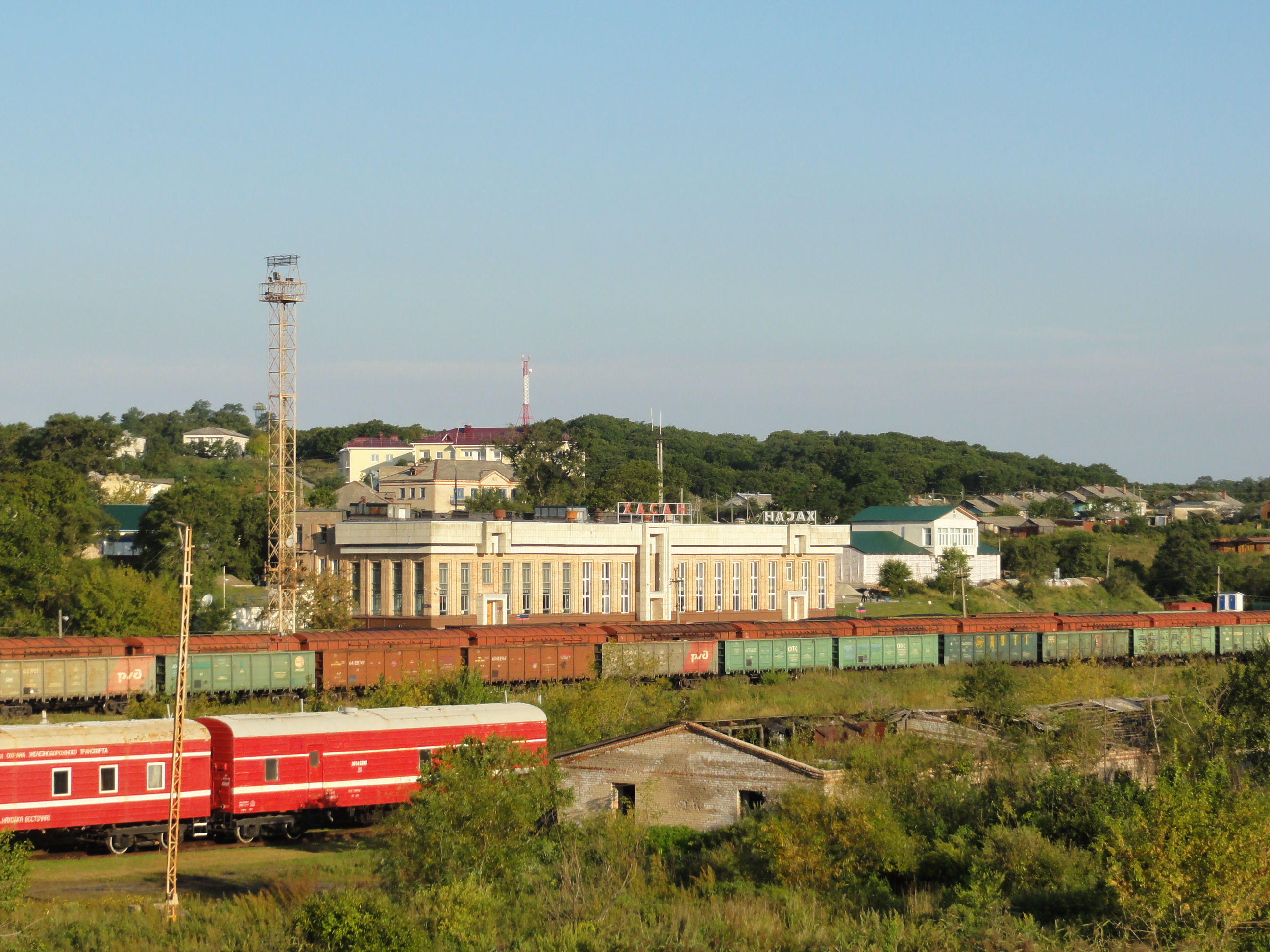
- Railway station building

General information
- Location: Khasan, Primorsky Krai, Russia
- Coordinates: 42.4299°N 130.6444°E
- System: Far Eastern Railway station
- Owner: Government of Russia
- Operator: Far Eastern Railway
- Line: Vladivostok branch

History
- Opened: 1951

Services
Preceding station	Russian Railways	Following station
Makhalino towards Baranovsky	Baranovsky–Khasan	through to Korean State Railway
Preceding station	Korean State Railway	Following station
through to Russian Railways	Hongŭi Line	Tumangang towards Hongŭi
Location

Khasan railway station is a railway station on the Baranovsky-Khasan railway line in the village of Khasan, Khasansky District, Primorsky Krai, Russia. It belongs to the Vladivostok branch of the Far Eastern Railway. It is the southeasternmost station in Russia near the border with North Korea.

== See also ==
- North Korea–Russia border
