= Ussuriysky =

Ussuriysky (masculine), Ussuriyskaya (feminine), or Ussuriyskoye (neuter) may refer to:

- Ussuriysky District, a former district of Primorsky Krai, Russia
- Ussuriysky Urban Okrug, a municipal formation, which the city of Ussuriysk, Primorsky Krai, Russia, is incorporated as
