= Tatyana Sedykh =

Russian journalist (born 1958)

- Татьяна Седых
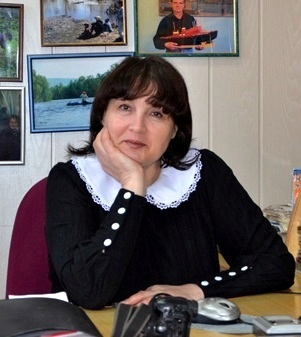
- Sedykh in 2012
- Born: 9 November 1958 (age 67); Moskalvo, Khabarovsk Krai, Russian SSR, Soviet Union
- Citizenship: Russia
- Occupation: Journalist
- Years active: 1991–present
- Employer: Moye Poberezhe
- Known for: Investigative journalism in the Russian Far East

Tatyana Aleksandrovna Sedykh (Russian: Татьяна Александровна Седых; born 9 November 1958) is a Russian journalist. She founded the weekly newspaper Moye Poberezhe in 2004, and has since been awarded the Artyom Borovik Award and the Andrei Sakharov Prize for her investigative journalism in the Russian Far East.

== Biography ==
Sedykh was born on 9 November 1958 in Moskalvo, a village in northwestern Sakhalin. At the age of 12, she was involved in an accident that resulted in the amputation of her leg. In 1991, Sedykh married and moved to Vanino, an urban locality in Khabarovsk Krai. She began working for the regional newspaper Voskhod, but resigned in 2004 after disagreeing with local officials and not wishing to be censored after critical articles she wrote were not published. In January 2004, Sedykh created her own newspaper, Moye Poberezhe. The paper published news local to communities along the Strait of Tartary, including Vaninsky District and Sovetsko-Gavansky District; it also includes a supplement, Senke, reporting on indigenous affairs, including the Oroch community. Moye Poberezhe has also collaborated with the television programme Wait for Me to publicise missing persons cases in the Russian Far East.

In 2007, Sedykh appealed to the Civic Chamber of the Russian Federation requesting protection from harassment from local authorities after the political administration of Vaninsky District filed a lawsuit against her requesting that Moye Poberezhe vacate the premises it occupied, which had been provided by the administration in 2005. A spokesperson for Vaninsky District described Sedykh as an "eternal oppositionist" and accused her of publishing only negative articles about Vanino and the wider district; it had previously described her being an "enemy of the district". In 2006, 12 retail outlets in Vanino refused to sell Moye Poberezhe, reportedly on an unofficial order made by the local administration.

Sedykh was the victim of an assassination attempt when her home in Vanino was burned down in 2004. While Sedykh was unharmed, her daughter was seriously injured, and much of Moye Poberezhe's office equipment was destroyed; the local administration refused to provide her with emergency accommodation. Sedykh's car has also been destroyed, in addition to an attempted attack on her apartment on Russian Press Day; false copies of Moye Poberezhe have been published. Sedykh has faced numerous threats made online, and an attempt was made to hit her with a car. None of the threats or attacks against Sedykh have led to any criminal charges being made.

In 2009, Sedykh was named as that year's laureate of the Andrei Sakharov Prize for Journalism; she became a member of the prize's awarding committee the following year.

In March 2011, Sedykh reported on a Russian ship that had arrived in the port of Vanino from Fukushima following the nuclear accident there, and that the ship contained within it high levels of radiation as a result. In response to this, the port's captain, Nikolai Tatarinov, accused Sedykh of unauthorised entry into a restricted area as well as disclosing classified information and espionage.
