= Chita railway station =

Railway station in Chita, Russia

Chita-2 Чита-2
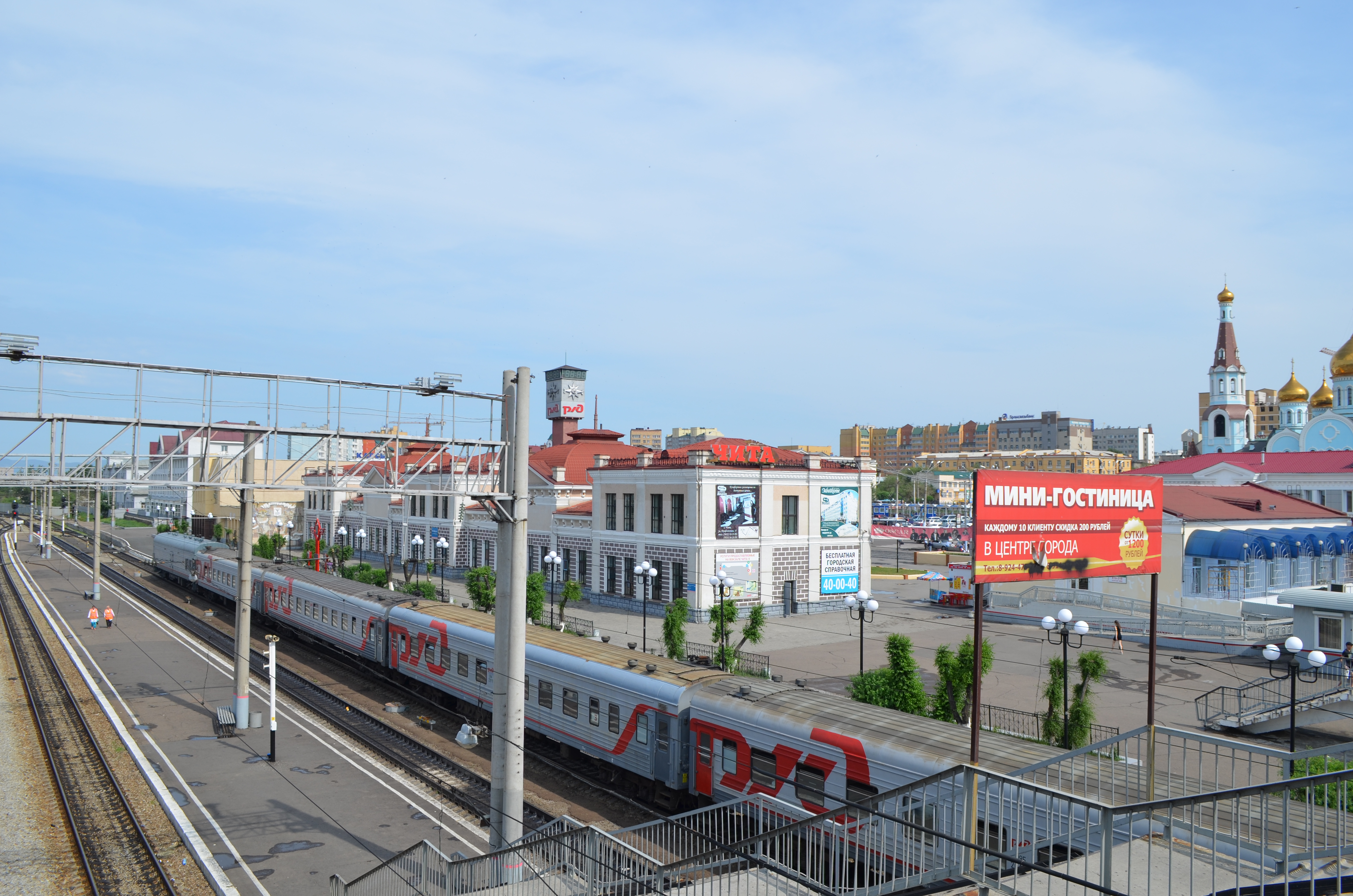

General information
- Location: Chita, Chitinsky District; Zabaykalsky Krai; Russia
- Coordinates: 52°1′42.32″N 113°29′42.36″E
- Owner: Russian Railways
- Operator: Transbaikal Railway
- Platforms: 5
- Tracks: 10

Construction
- Structure type: At-grade
- Parking: Yes

Other information
- Station code: 940010
- Fare zone: 0

History
- Opened: 15 July 1899

Services
| Preceding station | Russian Railways | Following station |
|---|---|---|
| Kadala towards Moscow Yaroslavsky | Moscow–Vladivostok | Peschanka towards Vladivostok |
| Terminus | Chita–Ussuriysk | Zabaikalsk towards Ussuriysk |
Location

Chita railway station is the primary passenger railway station for the city of Chita in Russia, and an important stop along the Trans-Siberian Railway. The station building is an object of cultural heritage of the peoples of Russia of regional importance and is protected by the state.

== Trains ==
=== Major Domestic Routes ===
- Moscow — Vladivostok
- Novosibirsk — Vladivostok
- Moscow — Khabarovsk
- Novosibirsk — Neryungri
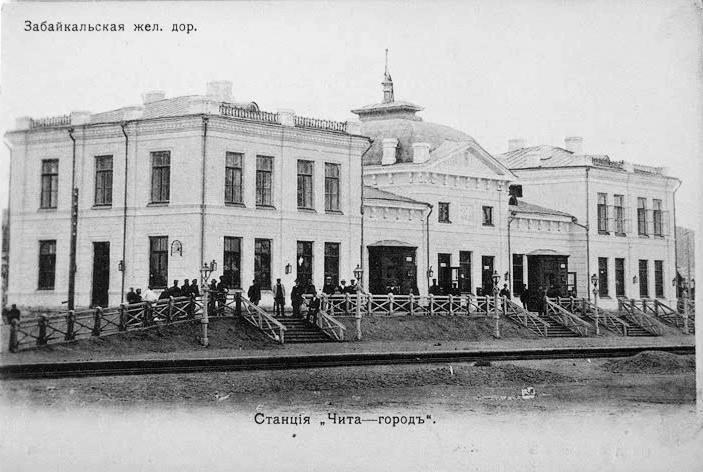
- Chita Railway station on a postcard from 1910
  Adler — Chita

=== International ===
| Train number | Train name | Destination | Operated by |
|---|---|---|---|
| 001М/002Щ | Rossiya; Россия | (Russia) Moscow (Yaroslavsky) (Russia) Vladivostok (cars: (North Korea) Pyongyang, (North Korea) Tumangang) | (Russia) Russian Railways |
| 019Ч/020Щ | Vostok; Восток | (Russia) Moscow (Yaroslavsky) (China) Beijing (Main) | (Russia) Russian Railways |
| 602Ч/653Ч | | (Russia) Priargunsk (cars: (China) Manzhouli) | (Russia) Russian Railways |
