= Hongui station =

Railway station in Hongŭi-ri, North Korea

Hongŭi 홍의

Korean name
- Hangul: 홍의역
- Hanja: 洪儀驛
- Revised Romanization: Hongui-yeok
- McCune–Reischauer: Hongŭi-yŏk

General information
- Location: Hongŭi-ri, Sŏnbong, Rasŏn-t'ŭkpyŏlsi; North Korea
- Coordinates: 42.4255°N 130.5366°E
- Owner: Korean State Railway

History
- Opened: 16 November 1929

Services
Preceding station	Korean State Railway	Following station
Tumangang towards Khasan (Russia)	Hongŭi Line	Terminus
Mulgol towards Rajin	Hambuk Line	Sahoe towards Ch'ŏngjin Ch'ŏngnyŏn
Location

Hongŭi station is a railway station in Hongŭi-ri, Sŏnbong, Rasŏn Special City, North Korea; it is the junction point of the Hongŭi and Hambuk lines of the Korean State Railway.

== History ==
The Chosen Government Railway opened the station on 16 November 1929, along with the rest of the Unggi–Sinasan section of the East Tomun Line – the first section to be laid.

In 2008, construction was started from Khasan, Russia, to Rajin port, including modernisation of communications equipment and the conversion of the standard-gauge track to dual-gauge (standard and Russian gauges), to allow movement of trains from Russia to Rajin without stopping for bogie changes. Construction was completed in October 2012, and an opening ceremony was held on 22 September 2013.

== Services ==
=== Freight ===
Tumangang station is the primary transit point for trade with Russia; all this traffic passes through Hongŭi station. The main imports from Russia are timber and crude oil; the main exports are magnesite, steel, fertiliser, non-ferrous metals and non-ferrous metal concentrates. However, since the collapse of the Soviet Union freight traffic has dropped significantly.

=== Passenger ===
The international express train 7/8 between P'yŏngyang and Moscow runs on this line between Hongŭi and Tumangang before crossing the border into Russia. There is also a long-distance service between Tumangang and Tanch'ŏn Ch'ŏngnyŏn station on the P'yŏngra Line.
