= Ussuriysk railway station =

Railway station in Ussuriysk, Russia

Ussuriysk Уссурийск
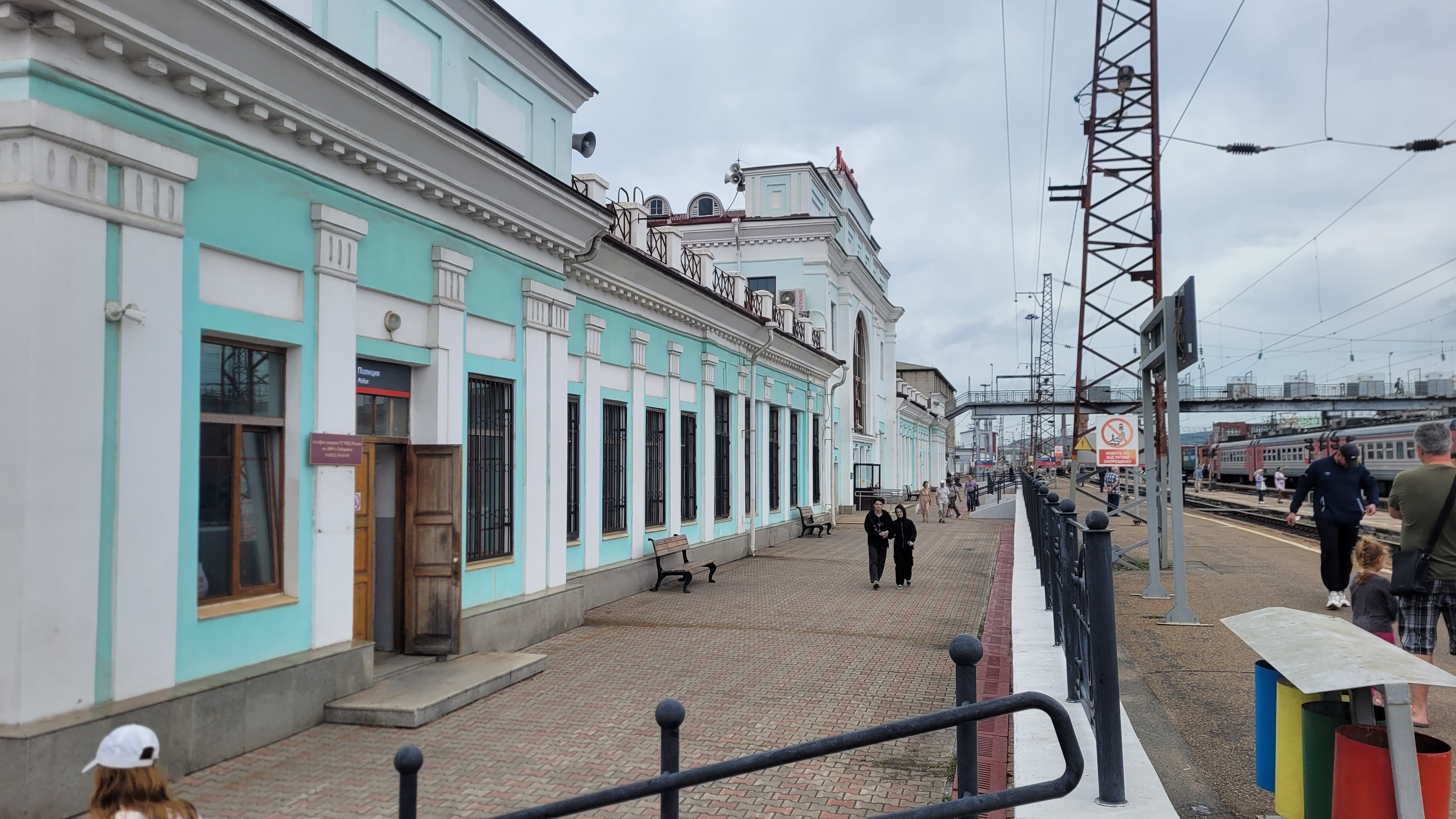

General information
- Location: Ussuriysk, Primorsky Krai; Russia
- Coordinates: 43°48′5.5″N 131°58′50″E
- Owner: Russian Railways
- Operator: Far Eastern Railway
- Platforms: 3
- Tracks: 15

Construction
- Structure type: At-grade
- Parking: Yes

History
- Opened: 1893

Services
Preceding station	Russian Railways	Following station
Dubininskiy towards Moscow Yaroslavsky	Moscow–Vladivostok	Baranovsky towards Vladivostok
Suifenhe towards Chita	Chita–Ussuriysk	Terminus
Location

Ussuriysk railway station is railway station and railway junction of Trans-Siberian Railway and Chinese Eastern Railway in Ussuriysk, Primorsky Krai, Russia.
