= Baranovsky railway station =

Railway station in Baranovsky, Russia

Baranovsky Барановский
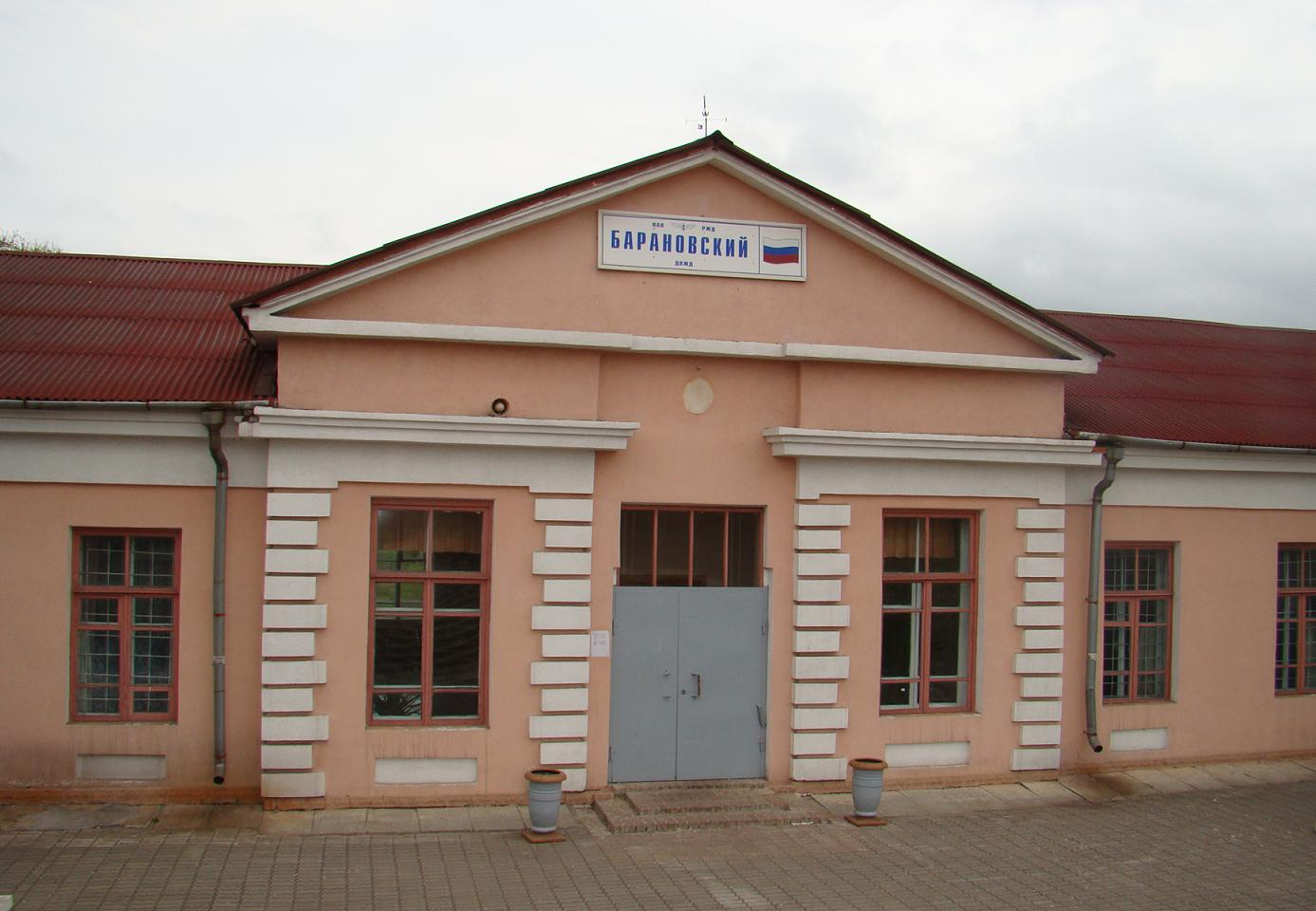
- Railway station building

General information
- Location: Baranovsky, Nadezhdinsky District; Primorsky Krai; Russia
- Coordinates: 43°38′44″N 131°55′38″E
- Owner: Russian Railways
- Operator: Far Eastern Railway
- Platforms: 1
- Tracks: 6

Construction
- Structure type: At-grade

History
- Opened: 1893

Services
Preceding station	Russian Railways	Following station
Ussuriysk towards Moscow Yaroslavsky	Moscow–Vladivostok	Nadezdinskaya towards Vladivostok
Terminus	Baranovsky–Khasan	Olenevod towards Khasan
Location

Baranovsky railway station is railway station in the village of Baranovsky, Nadezhdinsky District, Primorsky Krai, Russia. It belongs to the Trans-Siberian Railway and Baranovsky–Khasan railway line of the Far Eastern Railway.

This is a terminus of single-track Baranovsky–Khasan railway line that connects Baranovsky to Khasan railway station (last station on the Russian side). The train line continues to Tumangang Station in North Korea.

The main way of Transsib (in Khabarovsk and Vladivostok) electrified AC 25 kV (1963), the progress on the non-electrified Khasan. At the station, stop all trains and some passenger trains. Fast trains pass the station without stopping. The station receives and issues a carload freight and small shipments.
