= Vaninsky =

Vaninsky (Russian: Ва́нинский; masculine), Vaninskaya (Ва́нинская; feminine), or Vaninskoye (Ва́нинское; neuter) is the name of several rural localities in Russia:

- Vaninskaya, a village in Oparinsky District of Kirov Oblast
- Vaninskoye, Kirov Oblast, a village in Podosinovsky District of Kirov Oblast
- Vaninskoye, Yaroslavl Oblast, a village in Nekouzsky District of Yaroslavl Oblast

== See also ==
- Vanino
