= Vanino–Kholmsk train ferry =

Russian railway ferry service on Strait of Tartary

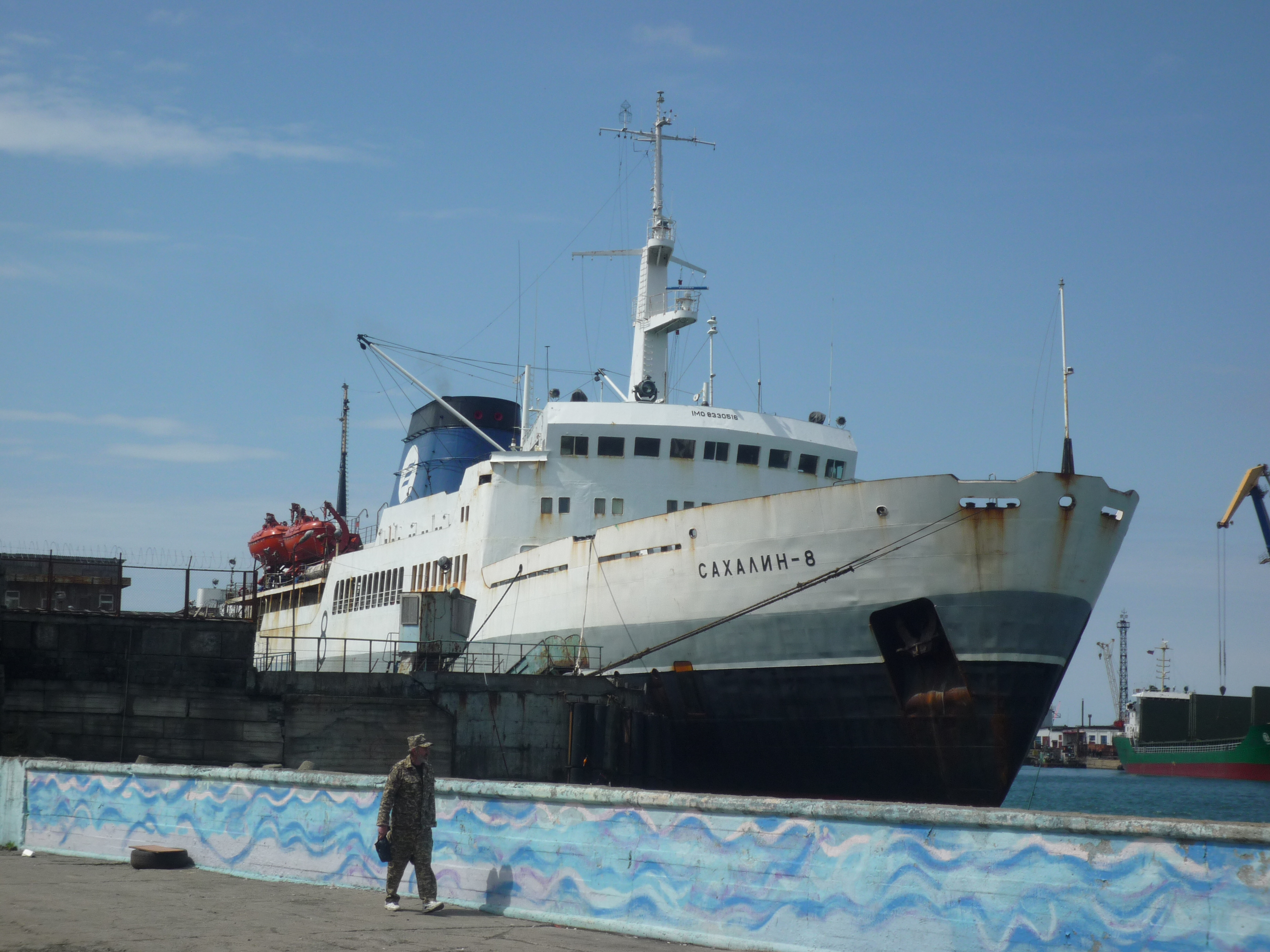
- Sakhalin-8 at Kholmsk port
- Locale: Russian Far East
- Waterway: Strait of Tartary
- Transit type: Train ferry
- Carries: Trains
- Operator: Sakhalin Shipping Company
- Began operation: 27 June 1973
- System length: 260-kilometer (160 mi)
- No. of terminals: 2

The Vanino–Kholmsk train ferry (Russian: Паромная переправа Ванино — Холмск) is the ferry connection across the Strait of Tartary in Russia that connects Vanino in Khabarovsk Krai and Kholmsk in Sakhalin Oblast. This ferry connects Sakhalin Island with mainland Russia; its distance is 260 km. It is operated by Sakhalin Shipping Company.

== History ==
From 1950 to 1953, the construction of the Sakhalin Tunnel was underway. However these works were suspended after the death of Stalin. In April 1962, a regional meeting on the development of Russian Far East was held in Yuzhno-Sakhalinsk, this suggestion was raised again. On September 3, 1964, “On Measures to Accelerate the Development of the Sakhalin Oblast Productive Forces” was adopted by the Central Committee of the CPSU and the Council of Ministers of the USSR. It included the idea of Vanino–Kholmsk train ferry.

On April 12, 1973, the Sakhalin-1 icebreaking ferry, coming its course from the Baltic, under the command of Captain V. S. Bylkova, dropped off at the Kholmsk port. On June 27, 1973, the Vanino–Kholmsk train ferry service was solemnly opened.

With the commissioning of this ferry, a qualitatively new stage in the development of transport and economic relations of the Sakhalin and the entire Russian Far Eastern region began. The transportation amount was increased, so 6 million tons of cargo and over 300 thousand passengers were transported. In the most intense for the crossing of the 1970s and 1980s, up to 8 ferries simultaneously operated on the line.

The general crisis of the economy in 1990s also affected the ferry. Cargo was delayed due to non-payment for transportation. Ferries sometimes for several days did not leave the ports.

== Recently ==
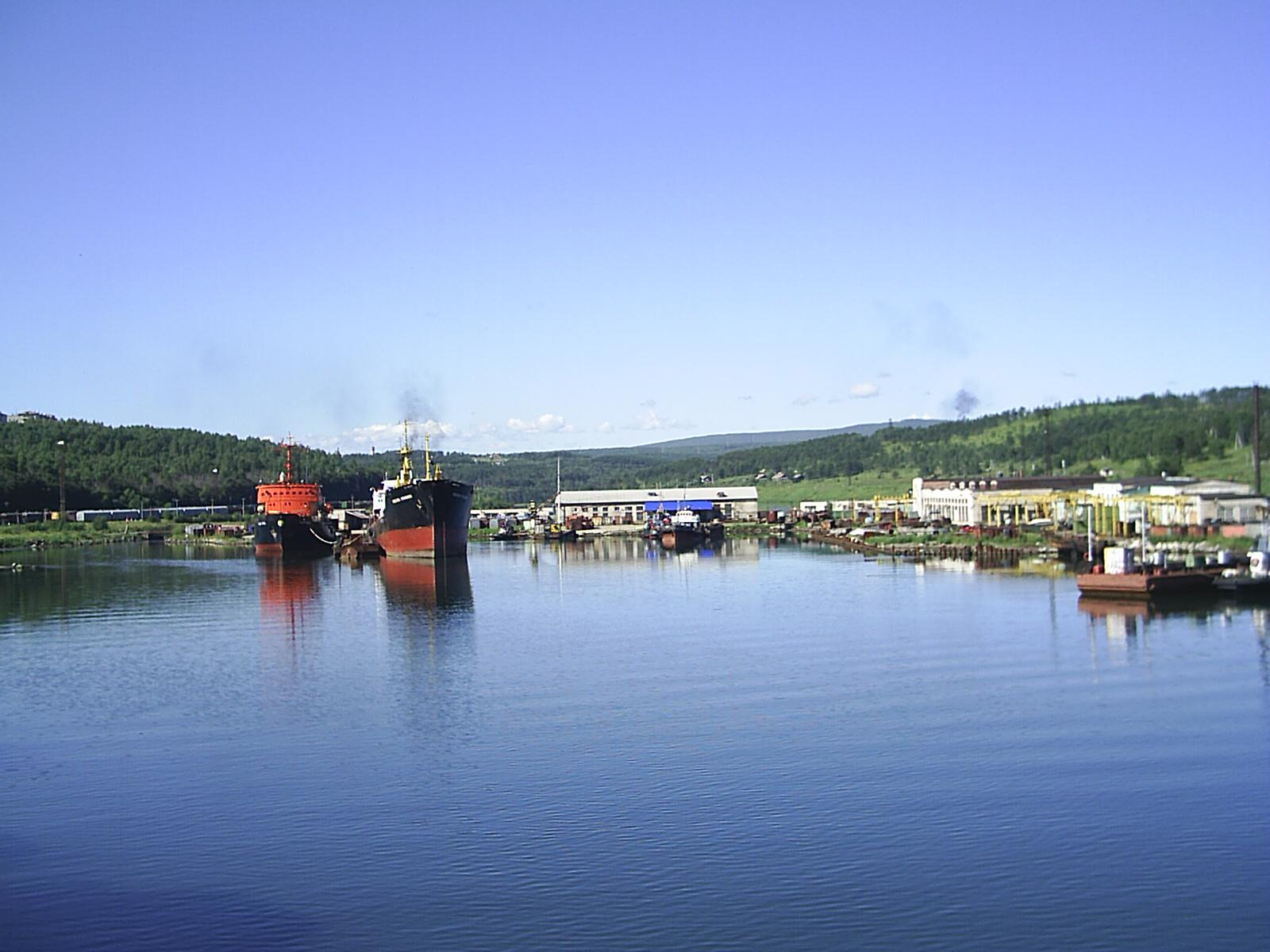
Vanino port

Vanino–Kholmsk train ferry is carried out by specialized ferry vessels designed and built specifically for work on this line. A total of 10 vessels of the Sakhalin series were built in the USSR at the Yantar Shipyard in Kaliningrad. The first five vessels no longer exist, Sakhalin-6 was sold to the Moscow Government to work in the Kerch Strait ferry line and later also disposed.

At the beginning of the 2010s, the ferry fleet owned by Sakhalin Shipping Company (SASCO), consists of four similar diesel-electric ships: Sakhalin-7, Sakhalin-8, Sakhalin-9 And Sakhalin-10. Each of them is designed to carry 28 railway wagons or 37 heavy trucks in one trip. In addition, each ferry (except for the Sakhalin-10 ferry equipped for the transport of dangerous goods) takes on up to one hundred passengers. Passenger transportation is carried out by ferry "Sakhalin-8" and "Sakhalin-9". A typical ferry time on the line is 11–12 hours, in winter and in bad weather, 16–18 hours, occasionally up to 21 hours.

Ferries transport directly those rail cars in which the cargo follows the network of Russian railways. This technology, which excludes physical transshipment of cargo in ports, makes it possible to reduce the time and volume of cargo operations of ports, reduce the time of transportation, increase the safety of cargo. Since the Sakhalin railway gauge (1067 mm) differs from the national one, bogie exchange is performed in the port of Kholmsk. At the same time, unlike some foreign rail ferries, the carriage of passenger cars at the Sakhalin ferry is not provided; passengers are transported in the passenger cabins of the ferry.

Since the end of the 90s, with the opening of a car service from Vanino to Khabarovsk and Komsomolsk-on-Amur, SASCO transports not only rail cars, but also motor vehicles, especially heavy vehicles with perishable goods and other consumer goods. in loads.

The ferry Vanino - Kholmsk and today continues to be the most important transport artery between Sakhalin and the mainland of Russia. Its capacity is 3.3 million tons of cargo per year. In 2009, 1.4 million tons of cargo were transported through it. The ferry provides year-round delivery of necessary goods for the Sakhalin Region and passengers. In the opposite direction, products from the fish, pulp and paper industry, etc. are delivered from the island to the mainland. Through the ferry, foreign trade cargoes are brought to the mainland, delivered by maritime merchant ships from Southeast Asia and others to the Sakhalin ports of Korsakov and Kholmsk.

In connection with the aging of ferry ships (the youngest ferry Sakhalin-10 was built in 1992, the others are even older) and the timing of their cancellation was approached by the Sakhalin Shipping Company, the feasibility study of the ferry complex was completed, including the construction of second-generation ferries with a capacity of 38 wagons option. There are no fixed timetables for ferries on the line, they are sent “by filling”, the time of departure and the approach of ships varies depending on the availability of cargo and weather conditions.

== See also ==
- Baikal–Amur Mainline
- Sakhalin Railway
- Sakhalin Tunnel
