= Tumangang station =

Railway station in North Korea

Tumangang 두만강
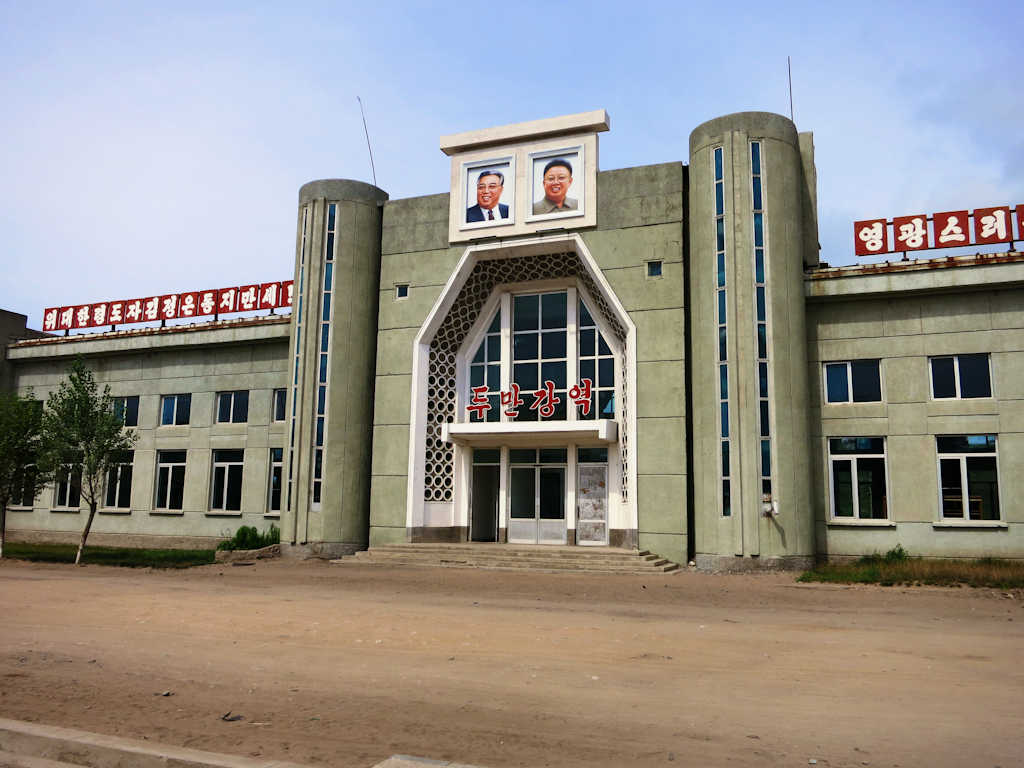
- Entrance to Tumangang station in 2015

Korean name
- Hangul: 두만강역
- Hanja: 豆滿江驛
- Revised Romanization: Dumangang-yeok
- McCune–Reischauer: Tumangang-yŏk

General information
- Location: Tumangang-rodongjagu, Sŏnbong-guyŏk, Rasŏn-t'ŭkpyŏlsi; North Korea
- Coordinates: 42.4214°N 130.6081°E
- Owner: Korean State Railway

History
- Opened: 22 September 2013

Services
Preceding station	Korean State Railway	Following station
Khasan (Russia) Terminus	Hongŭi Line	Hongŭi Terminus
Location

Tumangang station is a railway station in Tumangang-rodongjagu, Sŏnbong, Rasŏn Special City, North Korea, on the Hongŭi Line of the Korean State Railway.

In 2008, construction was started from Khasan, Russia to Rajin port, including modernisation of communications equipment and the conversion of the standard-gauge track to dual-gauge (standard and Russian gauges), to allow movement of trains from Russia to Rajin without stopping for bogie changes. Construction was completed in October 2012, and an opening ceremony was held on 22 September 2013.

There are service facilities for locomotives and rolling stock at Tumangang station.

== Services ==
=== Freight ===
Tumangang station is the primary transit point for trade with Russia. The main imports from Russia are timber and crude oil; the main exports are magnesite, steel, fertiliser, non-ferrous metals and non-ferrous metal concentrates, but since the collapse of the Soviet Union freight traffic has dropped significantly.

=== Passenger ===
The international express train 7/8 that operates between P'yŏngyang and Moscow runs on this line between Hongŭi and Tumangang before crossing the border into Russia, however this service is not able to be used by non-DPRK citizens due to chronic delays. There is also a long-distance service between Tumangang and Tanch'ŏn Ch'ŏngnyŏn station on the P'yŏngra Line.

The Russian Railways operate trains 651/652 between Moscow, Ussuriysk and Tumangang. Trains 651/652 are now the longest passenger train journey in the world that can be undertaken by foreign citizens – 9,453 km. Between Moscow and Ussuriysk, the carriages that form trains 651/652 are coupled to the Trans-Siberian Rossiya.
