= Ussuriysk Astrophysical Observatory =

Observatory in Russia

Coordinates: 43°41′58″N 132°09′48″E

Ussuriysk Astrophysical Observatory is an observatory near Ussuriysk, Russia. It is operated by the Far Eastern Branch of the Russian Academy of Sciences. Regular observations have been carried out in the observatory since 1954.
