= Far Eastern Railway =

Railway in Russia

Far Eastern Railway Дальневосточная железная дорога
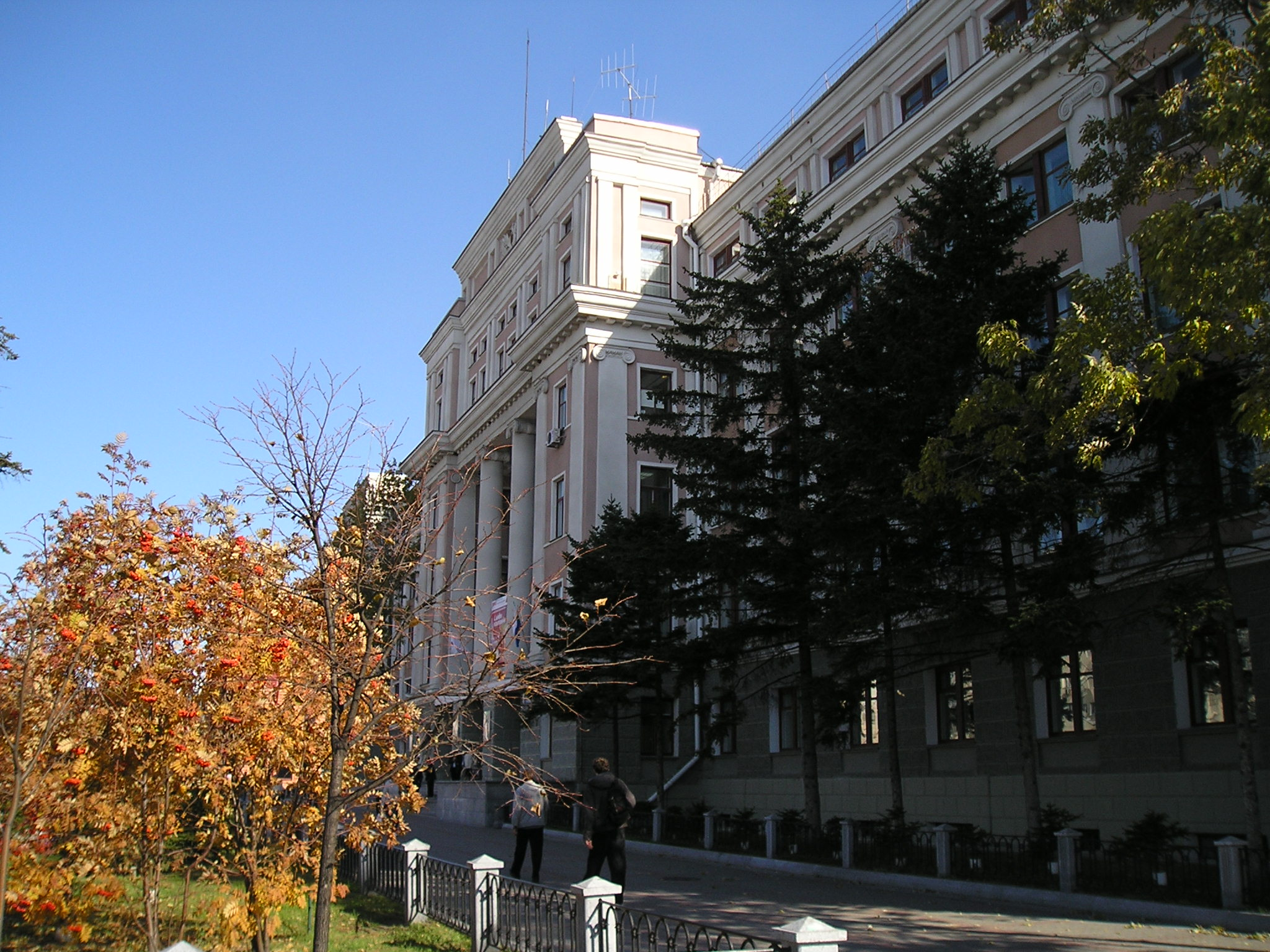
- The headquarters in Khabarovsk

Overview
- Headquarters: Khabarovsk
- Locale: Russia, Russian Far East
- Dates of operation: 1936–present

Technical
- Track gauge: 1,520 mm (4 ft 11 27/32 in)
- Previous gauge: 1,067 mm (3 ft 6 in) (Sakhalin Island, until 2019)
- Length: 6,826 km (4,240 mi)

Other
- Website: www.dvzd.rzd.ru

Far Eastern Railway (Russian: Дальневосточная железная дорога) is a railway in Russia that crosses Primorsky Krai, Khabarovsk Krai, Amur Oblast, Jewish Autonomous Oblast, and Yakutia.

== Information ==
The railway administration is located in Khabarovsk. The Far Eastern Railway borders with the Transbaikal Railway at Arkhara Station and Baikal Amur Mainline at Izvestkovaya and Komsomolsk-on-Amur Stations. There are 365 railway stations along the Far Eastern Railway and two border crossings: Grodekovo (Russo-Chinese border) and Khasan (a border between Russia and North Korea). The Railway consists of four divisions: the Khabarovsk Railway Division, Vladivostok Railway Division, Komsomolskoye Railway Division, and Tynda Railway Division. The biggest points of cargo departure and arrival are Khabarovsk-2, Izvestkovaya, Birobidzhan, Volochayevka-2, Komsomolsk-on-Amur, Sovetskaya Gavan, Sibirtsevo, Ussuriysk, Baranovsky, Uglovaya, Vladivostok, Nakhodka, Nakhodka Vostochnaya, and Vanino.

== Statistics ==
- Total working length: 5,990.6 kilometres (3,722.4 mi)
- Number of employees: 50,331
- Net weight hauled: 51,736 million tonnes
- Long-distance passenger traffic: 5 million people
- Suburban traffic: 19,990 million people

== History ==
The construction of the Far Eastern Railway commenced in May 1891 due to the economic development of the Russian Far East. In 1895, they opened regular train service between Vladivostok and Iman (today's Dalnerechenskaya railway station). In 1897, they commissioned the Khabarovsk-Vladivostok line. Direct train traffic from the Arkhara railway station to Vladivostok was launched in 1916 with the commissioning of the railroad bridge over the Amur River near Khabarovsk. More than 5,000 railmen were employed at the Far Eastern Railway in 1900.

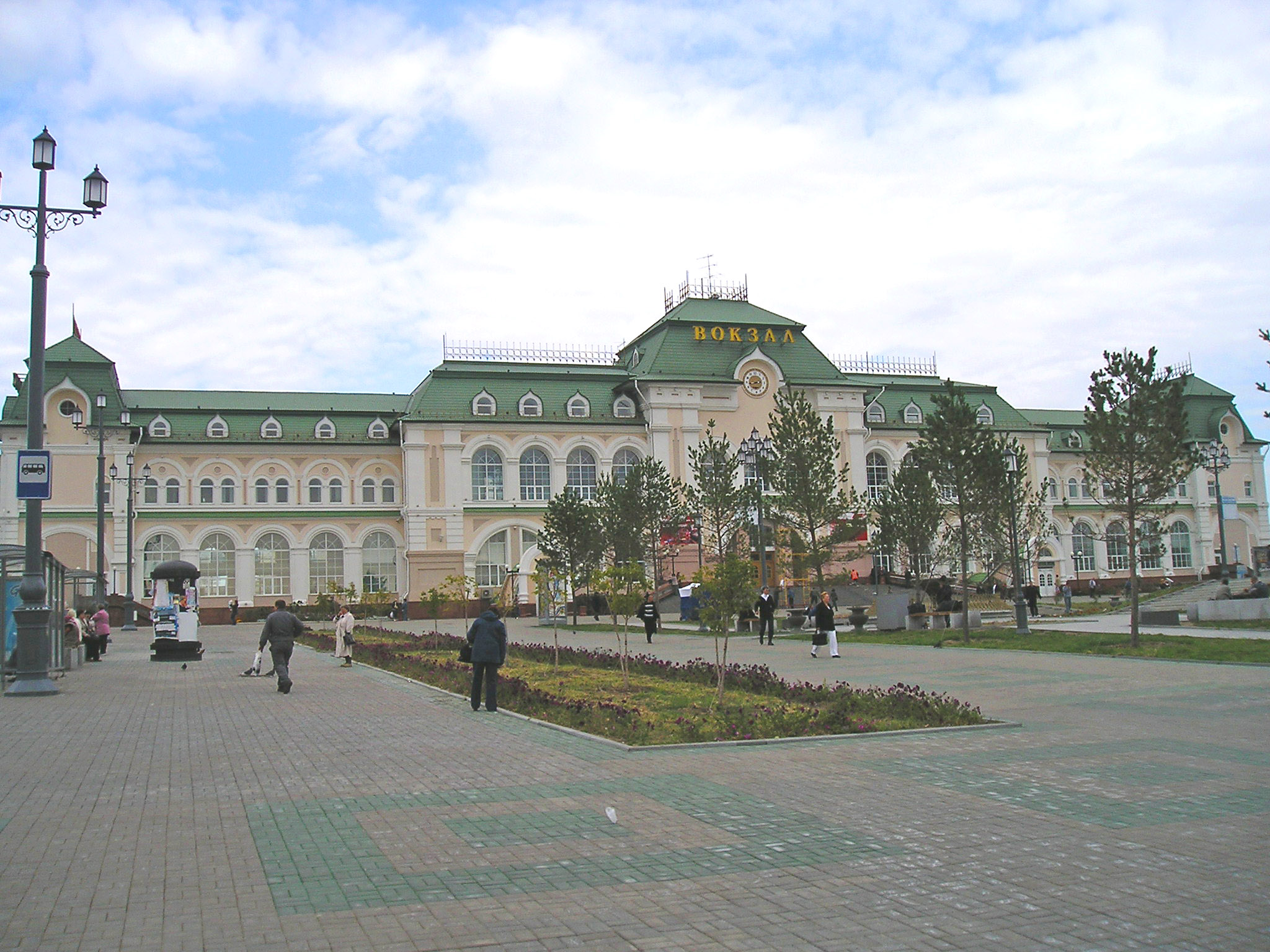
Khabarovsk railway station

During the Russian Civil War and the foreign military intervention the employees of the Far Eastern Railway had to rebuild destroyed bridges and damaged tracks and ensure stable traffic of urgent loads. Rail line restoration began in the winter of 1924-1925 from the reconstruction of the Khabarovsk Bridge due to the importance of resuming a through traffic over the Trans-Siberian Railway. In 1929, they built the Nadezhdinskaya-Tavrichanka line for the needs of the Primorsky Krai (for the servicing of agricultural regions near the Khanka Lake, in particular). In 1931, they finished the construction of the Sibirtsevo-Turiy Rog line. In 1935–1936, they reconstructed the Uglovaya-Partizansk line due to the increasing extraction of coking coal from the Suchansky coalfields. In 1940, they commissioned the Volochayevka-Komsomolsk-on-Amur line and Sibirtsevo-Varfolomeyevka line. In 1941, they finished the construction of the Birobidzhan-Leninsk line and Partizansk-Nakhodka section and commissioned the Smolyaninovo-Dunai, Partizansk-Sergeyevka, and Baranovsky-Gvozdevo lines. In 1940, they finished the construction of the main eastward sorting station called Khabarovsk-2 with a fully mechanized hump yard.

By the outbreak of the Great Patriotic War, the Far Eastern Railway had already had a well-developed infrastructure. It was put on a war footing in a very short period of time and began supplying the Eastern Front with military equipment, ammunition, and provisions. The railway management provided frontline railroads with staff, rolling stock, spare parts, and materials. Also, the Far Eastern Railway played an important role in assisting the Soviet Army in defeating the Imperial Japanese Army and seizing Southern Sakhalin and the Kuril Islands.

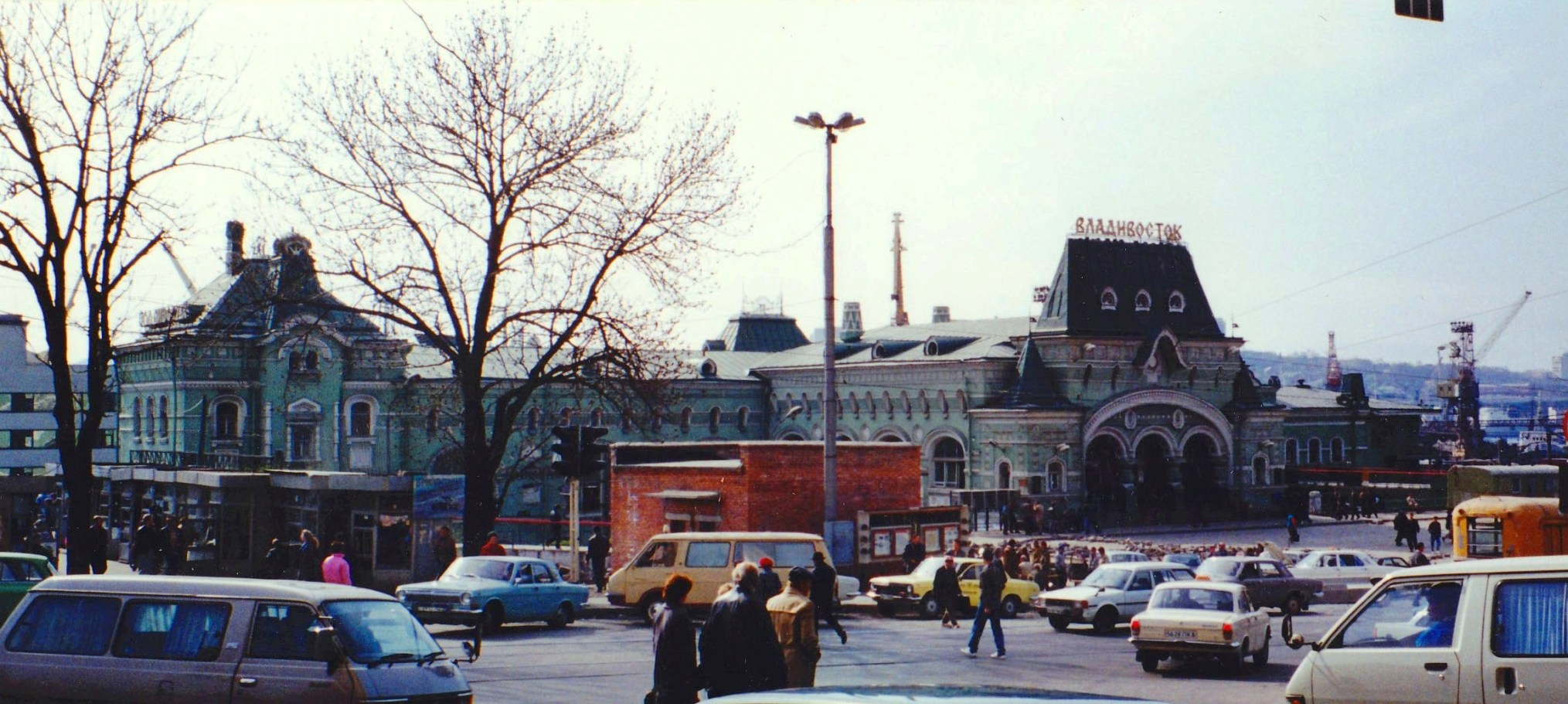
Vladivostok railway station

In 1947, the Komsomolsk-on-Amur—Sovetskaya Gavan line was commissioned, providing the second (after the Trans-Siberian Railway) railroad access to the Pacific Ocean and cutting the distance in 1000 km for maritime transportation to Sakhalin, Kamchatka, and Magadan Oblast. Due to the lack of bridge crossing over the Amur River near Komsomolsk-on-Amur, railcars crossed the river on a train ferry in the summertime and with special train platforms during the winter.

In 1963, the 3 ft 6 in (1,067 mm) gauge South Sakhalin Railway was incorporated into the Far Eastern Railway. In 1973, Vanino-Kholmsk train ferry started operating, improving transportation service in Sakhalin. In 1975, a unique railway river crossing over the Amur River near Komsomolsk-on-Amur was commissioned, providing a continuous year-round railway service between Volochayevka and Sovetskaya Gavan. New rail yards, such as Toki, Komsomolsk-Sortirovochniy, Nakhodka Vostochnaya etc. were opened.

== See also ==
- Canadian National Railway: The railway which dealt with similar geographic situation and remote location until 1988.
