= Vanino, Khabarovsk Krai =

Vanino Ванино
- Work settlement
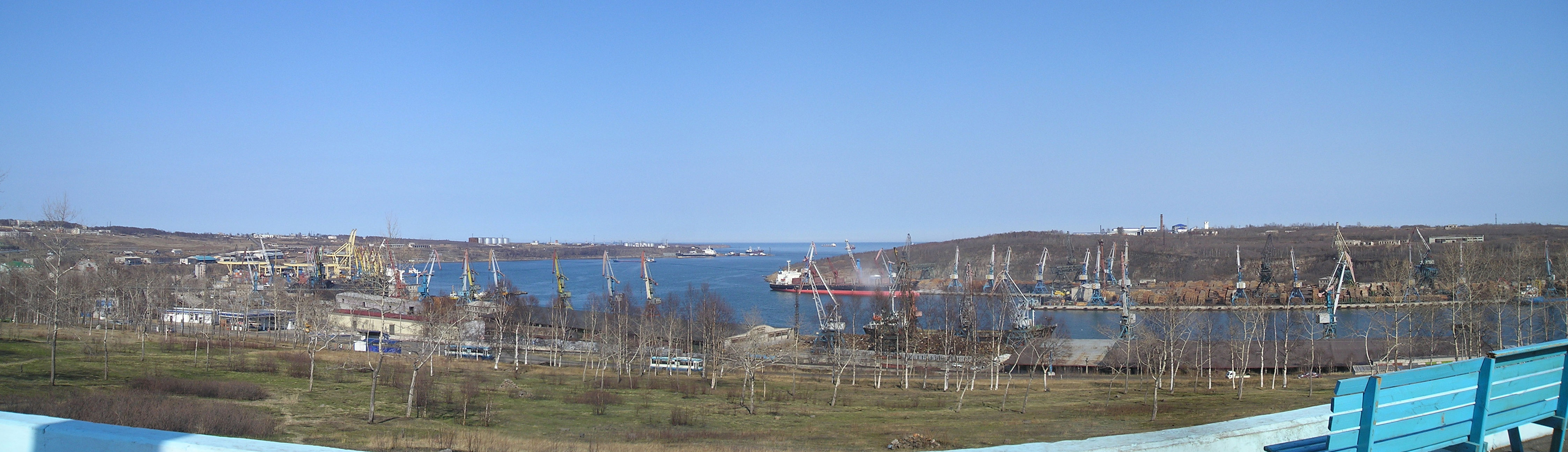
- The port of Vanino

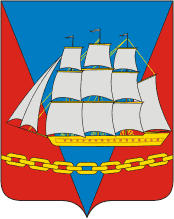
- Coat of arms
- Interactive map of Vanino
- Location of Vanino Vanino (Khabarovsk Krai)
- Coordinates: 49°05′N 140°16′E
- Country: Russia
- Federal subject: Khabarovsk Krai
- Administrative district: Vaninsky District
- Founded: 1907
- Elevation: 20 m (66 ft)

Population (2010 Census)
  - Total: 17,001
  - Estimate (2025): 16,617 (−2.3%)

Administrative status
  - Capital of: Vaninsky District
- Time zone: UTC+10 (MSK+7)
- Postal code: 682860
- Dialing code: +7 42137
- OKTMO ID: 08612151051
- Website: www.vanino.org

Vanino (Russian: Ва́нино), an urban locality (a work settlement) and the administrative center of Vaninsky District of Khabarovsk Krai, Russia, operates as a port on the Strait of Tartary. Population: 17,001 (2010 census); 19,180 (2002 census); 21,510 (1989 Soviet census).

== Geography ==
Vanino is located 15 kilometers (9.3 mi) north (straight-line distance) from Sovetskaya Gavan, but the actual road distance is about twice as much, as the sea coast is highly indented.

== History ==
Vanin Bay on the Strait of Tartary was named after a topographer who worked in a team that prepared maps of the coast in 1874. Vanino was established in 1907.

The Vanino Harbor, then considered part of Sovetskaya Gavan, received an overland connection with the rest of the USSR with the construction of railway from Komsomolsk-on-Amur (the easternmost section of the future Baikal-Amur Mainline), which was started in 1943 and completed in 1945. Vanino railway station was opened in 1947. That caused quick growth of the port in Vanino Harbor.

During the 1940s, Vanino, along with Vladivostok, was a major port for shipping convicts from the "mainland" USSR to Magadan, the port for the Kolyma Gulag labor camps. In post-Stalin era, the importance of the port continued to increase, as it provided the shortest connection to the seaports of Russian north-east. The cargo volumes handled by the port peaked in 1989, at 11.5 million tons. In 2005, the volume was 6.2 million tons.

In 1958, Vanino was administratively separated from Sovetskaya Gavan, becoming an urban-type settlement. In 1973, it became the administrative center of the newly created Vaninsky District.

== Economy ==
Vanino is an important port on the Strait of Tartary (northernmost part of Sea of Japan), served by the BAM railway line. The settlement's economic significance is based on its port, which is among the ten largest ports of Russia measured by its cargo-handling volume.

As of 2009, Vanino is a hub (and the main mainland railway connection) for the Sakhalin Shipping Company, which runs regular cargo boats from this port to Magadan, Petropavlovsk-Kamchatsky, and Pusan. Since 1973, this company has also operated an icebreaker vehicular, passenger, and Vanino-Kholmsk train ferry, providing an important connection between Sakhalin and the Russian mainland.

Vanino also has an oil terminal, as well as an oil refinery, run by Transbunker Group; it is the only oil refinery in Russia that is designed specifically for producing fuel oil for ship engines.

Vanino is Russia's second largest coal port on the Pacific after Vostochny Port (near Nakhodka), with between 15 million tons and 20 million tons of coal being handled per year. One of Russia's largest coal producers, Mechel constructed its own terminal in Vanino to supply coal-hungry Asian markets. The new terminal was completed in 2012 and was initially predicted to have the capacity to handle 25 million tons per year. In 2018, the port of Vanino is expected to ship approximately 20 million tons of coal. Russia’s largest coal producer, SUEK, has plans to expand the port of Vanino and raise its exports more than 80%, to 40 million tons per year. This expansion is to meet the rising demand for coal in the Asian market. The Russian Energy Minister Alexander Novak has announced plans to double Russia’s coal exports to Asia by 2025, another catalyst for the SUEK expansion.

== Media ==
The independent newspaper Moye Poberezhe, founded in 2004 by Tatyana Sedykh, publishes weekly from Vanino and reports on local news in the Strait of Tartary.

== Sister cities ==
Vanino is twinned with the following sister cities:

- Ishikari, Japan
- Yeosu, South Korea
