= Vaninsky District =

Vaninsky District Ванинский район (Russian)
- District
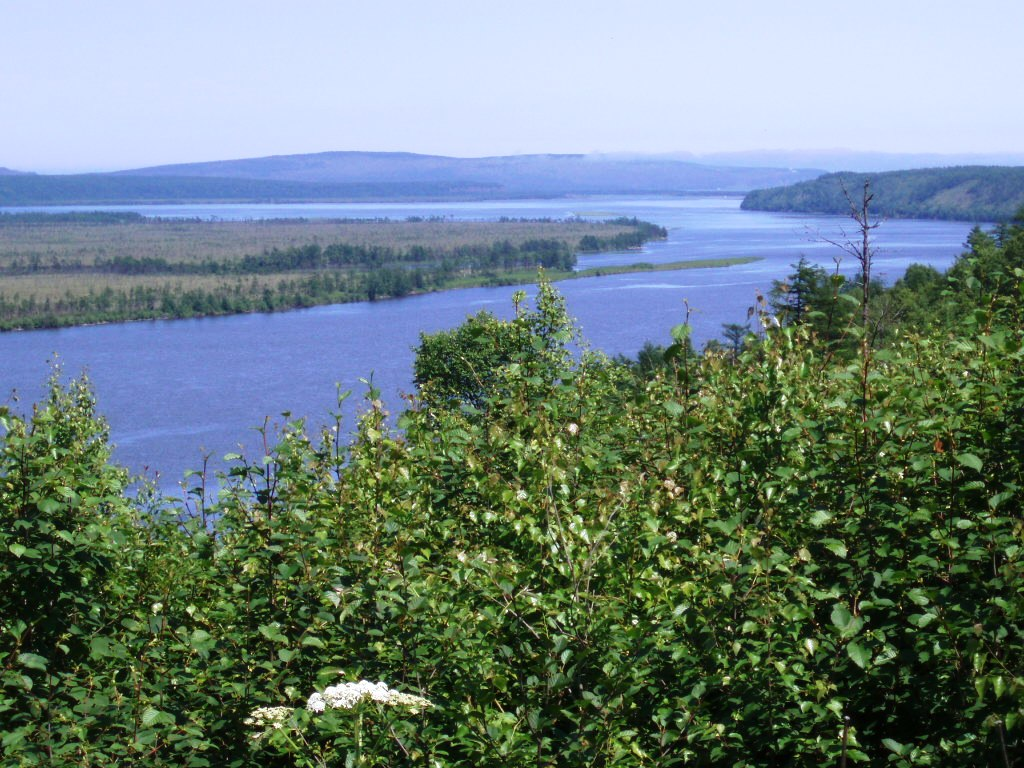
- Tumnin, in Vaninsky District

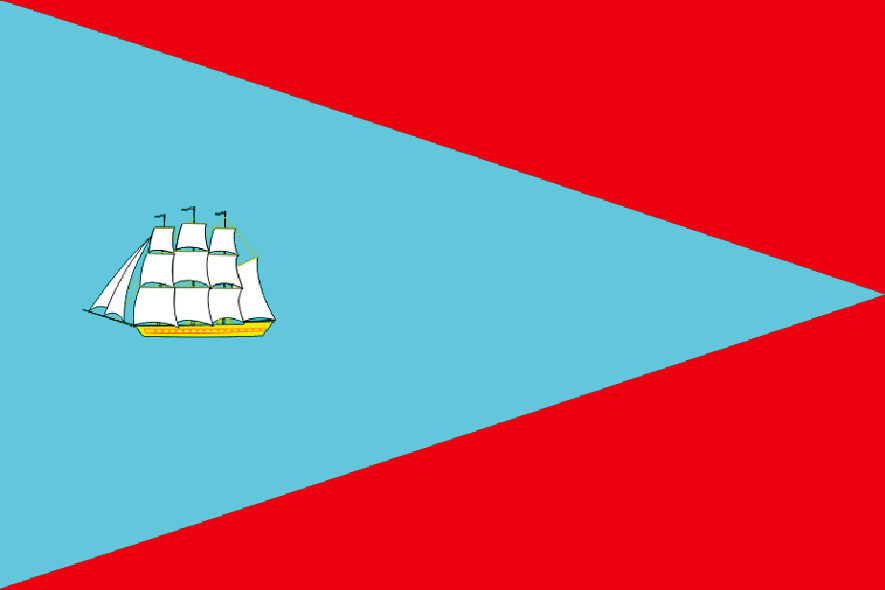
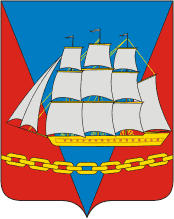
- Flag Coat of arms
- Location of Vaninsky District in Khabarovsk Krai
- Coordinates: 49°06′N 140°18′E
- Country: Russia
- Federal subject: Khabarovsk Krai
- Established: 1973
- Administrative center: Vanino

Area
  - Total: 25,747 km^{2} (9,941 sq mi)

Population (2010 Census)
  - Total: 37,310
  - Density: 1.449/km^{2} (3.753/sq mi)
  - Urban: 71.3%
  - Rural: 28.7%

Administrative structure
  - Inhabited localities: 3 urban-type settlements, 17 rural localities

Municipal structure
  - Municipally incorporated as: Vaninsky Municipal District
  - Municipal divisions: 3 urban settlements, 7 rural settlements
- Time zone: UTC+10 (MSK+7)
- OKTMO ID: 08612000
- Website: http://www.vanino.org/

Vaninsky District (Russian: Ва́нинский райо́н) is an administrative and municipal district (raion), one of the seventeen in Khabarovsk Krai, Russia. It is located in the east of the krai. The area of the district is 25,747 square kilometers (9,941 sq mi). Its administrative center is the urban locality (a work settlement) of Vanino. Population: 37,310 (2010 census); 42,235 (2002 census); 51,428 (1989 Soviet census). The population of Vanino accounts for 45.6% of the district's total population.
