= Sakhalin Shipping Company =

Shipping company in Eastern Russia and along the Russian Arctic coast

- Type: Joint-stock company
- Industry: Shipping
- Founded: 1945
- Headquarters: Kholmsk, Russia
- Website: www.sasco.ru

Sakhalin Shipping Company (SASCO) (Russian: Сахалинское морское пароходство) is a shipping company which provides ice-class ferry, cargo, and tramp service in Eastern Russia and along the Northern Sea Route. Headquartered in Kholmsk, on Sakhalin's west coast, the company provides 2/3 of all Russian cabotage and is the sole ferry service provider to Sakhalin.

== History ==
=== Early years ===
On October 27, 1945, the Sakhalin State Steamship Company (Sakhalin Godsmorparakhodtsvo) was formed from 13 vessels previously operated by the Nikolaev-on-Amur Shipping Company and several vessels from the Far East Shipping Company (FESCO). The new shipping company was intended to promote the economic development of Sakhalin, which Russian had recently acquired from Japan. By 1951, the company's fleet had grown to 30 vessels and transported 2 million tons of cargo from Vladivostok to Sakhalin and other ports along the Sea of Okhotsk.

After the failure of the Sakhalin Tunnel project in 1953, Sakhalin State Shipping Company began construction on the required infrastructure to support rail and vehicle ferry service between Vanino and Kholmsk. Routine passenger ferry service began in April 1973 on the icebreaking ferry vessel Sakhalin-1 and rail ferry service began in June 1973.

By the 1960s, the shipping company's fleet was completely renovated. New transportation routes were constantly being developed. In particular, during this period, the shipping company became one of the main carriers of goods for the fighting people of Vietnam.

=== Privatization ===
The company underwent privatization in 1992 under the name Sakhalin Shipping Company. At the time of privatization, the company held 77 ships (383,000 DWT). The annual transportation volume was 13 million tons, of which 5.8 million was carried on the Vanino - Kholmsk ferry crossing and 2.4 million on overseas voyages.

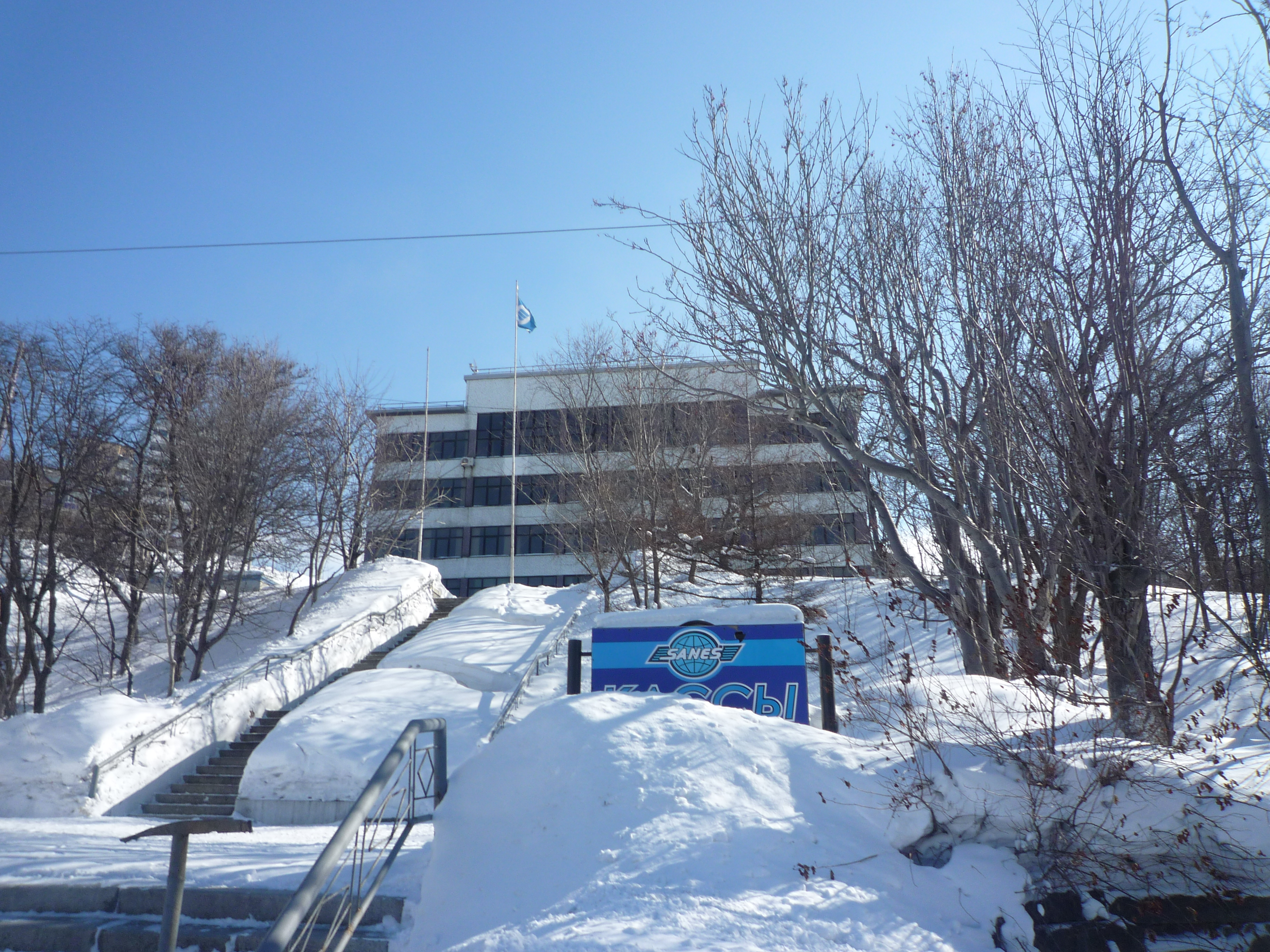
Sakhalin Shipping Company Office

=== Current Operations ===
Faced with weak bulk cargo demand in eastern Russia, SASCO has leveraged its existing fleet of ice-class vessels to provide cargo service to along the Northern Sea Route. The company inaugurated service to the eastern Northern Sea Route service in 2014, but now provides service along the full length of the route during the summer and fall months. In 2021 SASCO transported equipment from Vladivostok to Novatek natural gas projects on the Taimyr peninsula.

In 2022 SASCO was acquired by Delo Group, a Russian logistics and port infrastructure conglomerate.

==== Sanctions ====
On July 20, 2023, SASCO was sanctioned by the US State Department in relation to the ongoing Russo-Ukrainian War. Specifically, SASCO was sanctioned for its role in providing logistical support to future energy projects in the Russian Arctic, particularly those in the Taimyr Peninsula. The sanctions prohibit US entities from dealing with SASCO or its subsidiaries (OOO MPL Vanino Sakhalin and AO Vostok Treid Invest) as well as the 14 vessels of the SASCO fleet.

== Services ==
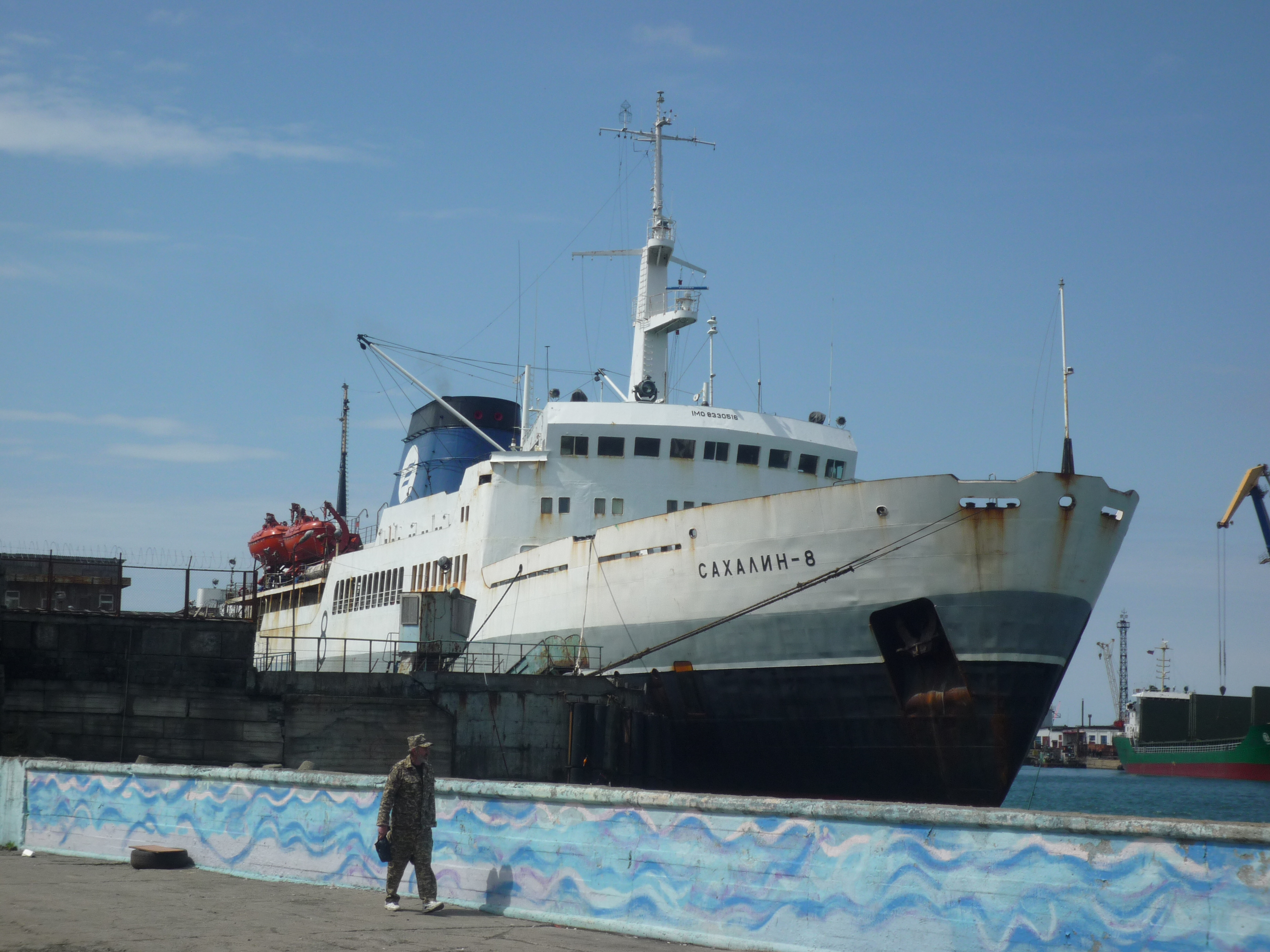
Sakhalin-8 ferry

As of June 2024, SASCO operates its three ferries in regular service on the Vanino - Kholmsk line.

SASCO also operates regular cargo service along the following lines:

- Vostochny - Koraskov
- Vladivostok - Korsakov
- Vladivostok - Magadan
- Vladivostok - Shanghai
- Vladivostok - Ningbo - Xiamen

The company provides additional tramp service, primarily between ports in the northwestern Pacific.

=== Previous Destinations ===
SASCO previously operated regular cargo or ferry service along the following lines:

- Vostochny - Kohlmsk
- Vostochny - Petropavlovsk
- Vanino - Petropavlovsk
- Vanino - Magadan
- Korsakov - Busan
- Korsakov - Wakkanai

== Fleet ==
SASCO operates a fleet of 3 ferries and 11 cargo vessels as well as several harbor tugs. The fleet is registered to the port of Kholmsk and sails under Russian flag. All vessels in the SASCO fleet are ice rated to Russian Maritime Register of Shipping ice class L1 or Arc4 (approximately equivalent to Finnish-Swedish ice class 1A).

Vessel	Built	Type	DWT	Ice Class
SASCO Aldan	2007	General Cargo	12746	1A
SASCO Avacha	2001	Container Ship	8425	Arc4
SASCO Angara	2001	Container Ship	6420	Arc4
SASCO Aniva	2002	Container Ship	8441	Arc4
Patria	1999	RORO Cargo	5825	L1
Zeya	1995	Container Ship	4868	L1
Kunashir	1998	Container Ship	9105	L1
Paramushir	1998	General Cargo	9105	L1
Selenga	1988	General Cargo	6030	L1
Shantar	1999	General Cargo	9105	L1
Simushir	1998	General Cargo	9105	L1
Sakhalin-8	1985	ROPAX (Rail)	2427	L1
Sakhalin-9	1986	ROPAX (Rail)	3030	L1
Sakhalin-10	1992	ROPAX (Rail)	2820	L1

== Accidents and incidents ==
=== Simushir ===
On 16 October 2014, the SASCO-owned MV Simushir lost power off Haida Gwaii, also known as the Queen Charlotte Islands, along British Columbia's coast as it made its way from Everett, Washington, US, to Russia. The Canadian Forces' Joint Rescue Co-ordination Centre said the large oceangoing tugboat Barbara Foss arrived on 18 October to the tow of the Simushir. The Canadian Coast Guard Cutter Gordon Reid was assisting, and the US Coast Guard kept a rescue helicopter on stand-by if the crew needed to be evacuated. There were 10 crew members aboard the Simushir. The USCG had already evacuated the ship's captain because of an injury he suffered.

== See also ==
- FESCO- A similar shipping company which operates out of Vladivostok
