= Tanchon Chongnyon station =

Railway station in North Korea

Tanch'ŏn Ch'ŏngnyŏn station

General information
- Location: North Korea
- Coordinates: 40°27′16″N 128°54′15″E
- Operator: Korean State Railway
- Line: P'yŏngra Line
Location

Tanch'ŏn Ch'ŏngnyŏn station is a railway station in North Korea. It is located on the P'yŏngra Line of the Korean State Railway.
