= Ussuriysk =

City in Primorsky Krai, Russia

Ussuriysk Уссурийск
- City
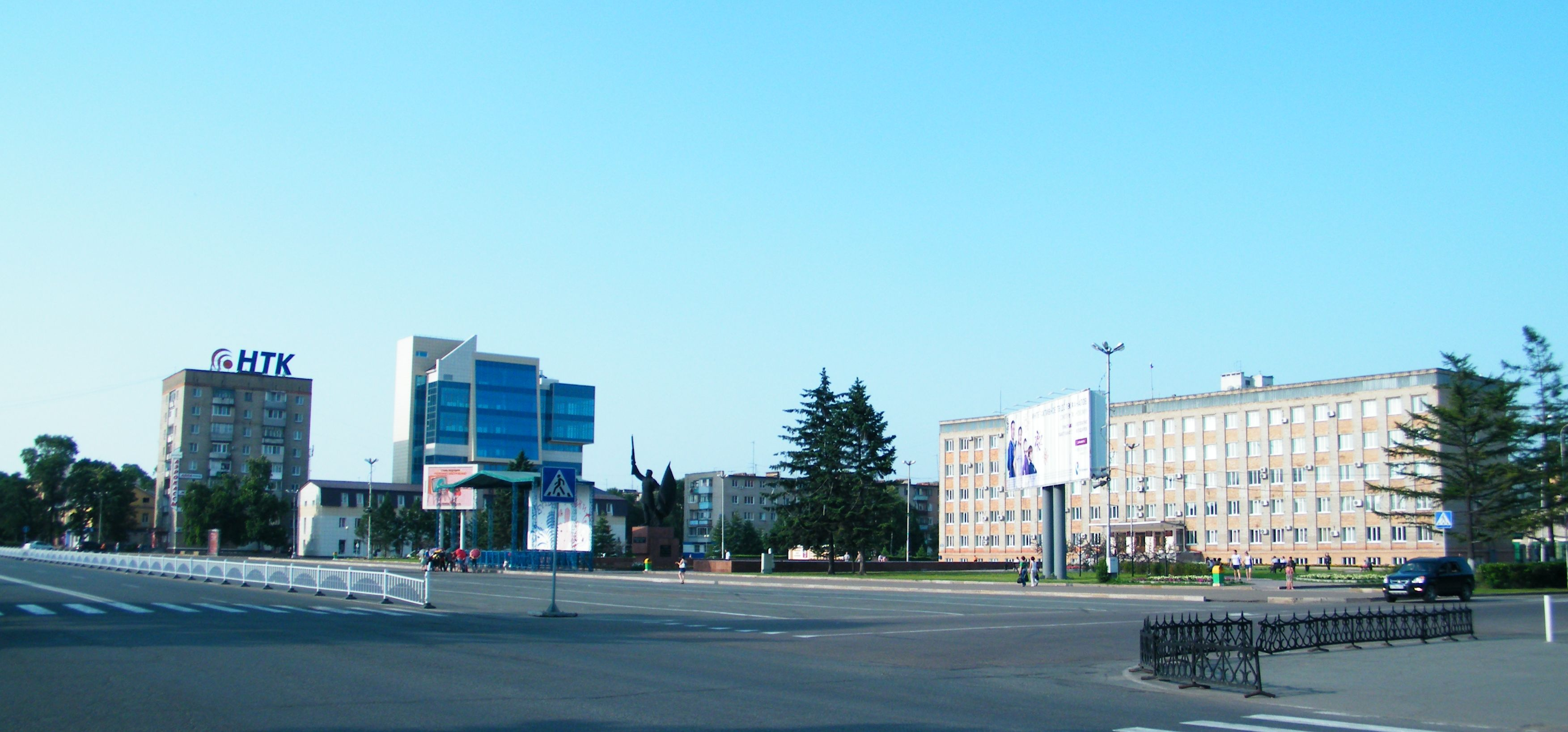
- Nekrasova Street in Ussuriysk

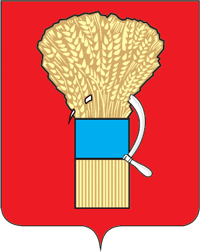
- Coat of arms
- Interactive map of Ussuriysk
- Location of Ussuriysk Ussuriysk (Primorsky Krai)
- Coordinates: 43°48′N 131°58′E
- Country: Russia
- Federal subject: Primorsky Krai
- Founded: 1866
- City status since: 1898

Area
  - Total: 173 km^{2} (67 sq mi)
- Elevation: 33 m (108 ft)

Population (2010 Census)
  - Total: 158,004
  - Estimate (2025): 179,862 (+13.8%)
  - Rank: 111th in 2010
  - Density: 913/km^{2} (2,370/sq mi)

Administrative status
  - Subordinated to: Ussuriysk City Under Krai Jurisdiction
  - Capital of: Ussuriysk City Under Krai Jurisdiction

Municipal status
  - Urban okrug: Ussuriysky Urban Okrug
  - Capital of: Ussuriysky Urban Okrug
- Time zone: UTC+10 (MSK+7)
- Postal codes: 692500–692503, 692506, 692508–692512, 692515, 692519, 692522–692530, 692548–692554, 692558, 692559
- Dialing code: +7 4234
- OKTMO ID: 05723000001
- Website: adm-ussuriisk.ru

Ussuriysk (Russian: Уссури́йск) is a city in Primorsky Krai, Russia, in the valley of the Razdolnaya River. The city is 98 kilometers (61 mi) north of Vladivostok, the administrative center of the krai, and about 60 kilometers (37 mi) from both the China–Russia border and the Pacific Ocean.

Historical population
Year	Pop.	±%
1897	10,868	—
1926	35,344	+225.2%
1939	71,867	+103.3%
1959	104,310	+45.1%
1970	128,235	+22.9%
1979	146,782	+14.5%
1989	158,016	+7.7%
2002	157,759	−0.2%
2010	158,004	+0.2%
2021	180,393	+14.2%
Source: Census data

It was previously known as Nikolskoye (until 1898), Nikolsk-Ussuriysky (until 1935) and Voroshilov (until 1957).

== History ==
=== Medieval history ===
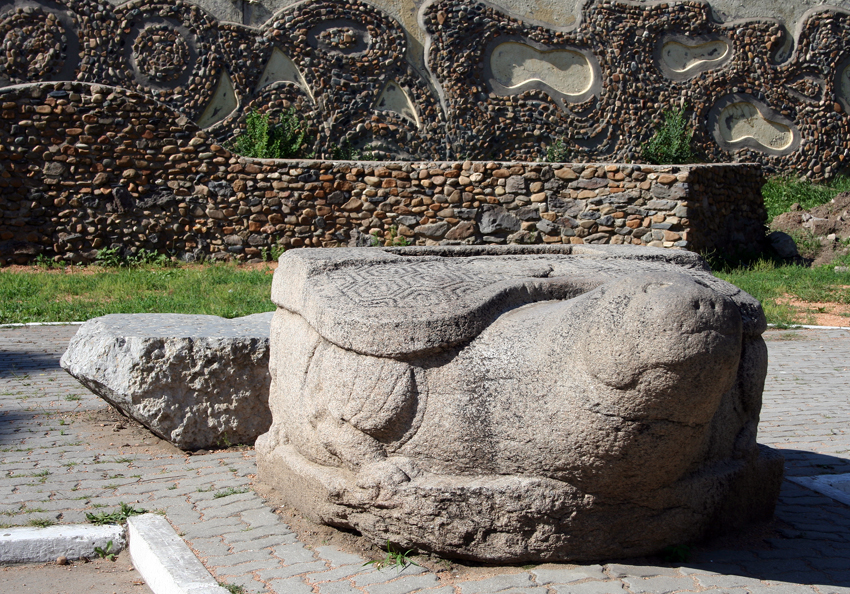
A 12th-century stone tortoise from a Jīn Dynasty grave now can be seen in Ussuriysk's central park

The area of what now is Ussuriysk was settled by Yulou Mohe tribes. From the mid-9th century, it became Solbin-bu of the Balhae Kingdom. It is then populated by the Dōnghǎi Jurchens, under control of Liao dynasty. The city then become capital of Jīn Dynasty's Sùpín circuit (速頻路). Then it went under control of Yuan, Ming and Qing dynasties respectively and known as Shuangchengzi (Chinese: 双城子; simplified Chinese: 双城子; traditional Chinese: 雙城子; pinyin: Shuāngchéngzi).

=== Modern era ===
In 1866, the settlement of Nikolskoye (Нико́льское) was founded on the area of today's Ussuriysk, named after Saint Nicholas. Due to its advantageous geographic location at the crossing of the transportation lines, the village experienced rapid growth during the 1870s, turning into a trade center. Its role increased after the railroad connecting Khabarovsk and Vladivostok (now a part of the Trans-Siberian Railway) was built, and in 1898 it was granted town status and renamed Nikolsk-Ussuriysky (Нико́льск-Уссури́йский).

By the beginning of the 20th century the town's population totaled 15,000 people, and the annual turnover of its trade enterprises was equal to three million rubles. After the Russo-Japanese War of 1904–1905, Nikolsk-Ussuriysky became one of the most important commercial and economic centers of the Russian Far East. In 1913, the city ranked fourth after Vladivostok, Blagoveshchensk, and Khabarovsk in terms of population.

Enterprises were established processing agricultural products such as mills, dairies, soap-boiling plants, and tanneries, as well as macaroni and sausage factories and breweries. Brick factories, quarries, and saw-mills were also built.

The central part of the city began to be built up with two- and three-story masonry buildings. In 1914, there were fourteen educational institutions, a theater, a circus, and three movie-theaters in Nikolsk-Ussuriysky.

After the October Revolution of 1917, the city's economy experienced rapid growth. The city specialized in processing agricultural products. The name of the city was changed to Voroshilov in 1935 after Kliment Voroshilov. With Nikita Khrushchev's ascent to power after Stalin's death the city's name was changed in 1957 to Ussuriysk after the Ussuri River, which is more than 140 km away.

In 1993 the city administration erected a monument at the burial site of those shot during the Great Terror.

Until the 1980s, the city ranked second in the krai in population, having only recently yielded to Nakhodka. Ussuriysk is still second only to Vladivostok as a theatrical and higher-educational center (it is home to the Pedagogical and Agricultural Institutes, and the Higher Military School).

== Administrative and municipal status ==
Within the framework of administrative divisions, it is, together with thirty-seven rural localities, incorporated as Ussuriysk City Under Krai Jurisdiction—an administrative unit with the status equal to that of the districts. As a municipal division, Ussuriysk City Under Krai Jurisdiction is incorporated as Ussuriysky Urban Okrug.

== Demographics ==
Ethnic composition (2010):

- Russians – 91%
- Koreans – 3%
- Ukrainians – 2.4%
- Tatars – 0.5%
- Others – 3.1%

== Economy ==
The city's industry is represented by twenty-eight enterprises, including twelve of the food industry, two of light industry, six of metal industry, and four of construction industry. Ussuriysk has always specialized in the production of consumer goods. That is why at present it is in a more favorable situation as compared with other large cities of Primorye where enterprises of war industry prevailed.

The largest enterprises of light industry are Primorsky Sakhar (which provides the Russian Far East with sugar, producing 160,000 tonnes per year), Dalsoya (which produces vegetable oil, margarine, and soap), Ussuriysky Balsam (24 kinds of liqueur and vodka products, and balsams made of a blend of dozens of herbs). Five articles of Ussuriysky Balsam were given diplomas of the first and the second degrees at all-Russian competition of alcohol products.

One more economic feature of Ussuriysk is its wholesale trade. There are approximately thirty specialized and multipurpose trade bases, many of which had developed contacts with foreign partners before the external economic policy was liberalized in Russia.

Among the city's other enterprises are the Grado firm which annually produces up to 600,000 pairs of footwear, and the Locomotive Repairing Plant. The annual industrial output of Ussuriysk equals 8% of Primorsky Krai's production. Besides, the city is the crossing point of all major highways and railroads of the krai.

== Sport ==
=== Ice hockey ===
Ice hockey takes place at the Ledovaya Arena, located on Krasnoznamennaya Ulitsa, 161а. The ice hockey team Primorye Ussuriysk played there from 2009 until they were dissolved in 2011.

=== Speedway ===
Ice speedway and motorcycle speedway takes place at the Sergei Petrovich Shevchenko Stadium (other names, Patriot Stadium or Meliorator Stadium), located at Komsomol'skaya Ulitsa, 87А, which is adjacent on the south side of the Ledovaya Arena. The Vladivostok Speedway team competed at the stadium during the 1990s in the Russian Team Speedway Championship, when their own stadium was unavailable.

== Theaters ==
The Ussuriysk Drama Theater of the Eastern Military District is located at #31 Sovyetskaya Street. The theater was founded in 1937 and is one of the two theaters of the Russian Army (the other is the Central Theater of the Russian Army in Moscow).

The Ussuriysk Drama Theater is located at #33 Volodarskogo Street. It was opened in 1937. The theater is of classical tendencies. Plays are staged both for adults and children. The hall can accommodate 428 people.

== Architecture and monuments ==
The central part of the city, including Lenina, Chicherina, Krasnoznamyonnaya, and Ageyeva Streets, is of historic value. The city's oldest hotel (#28 Lenina St.) was constructed in 1880. #53 Lenina St., which houses the city's oldest movie-theater Grand-Illyuzion, was built in 1908.

On the central square there is a monument to the Red Guards and partisans, who died in the battles at Ussuriysk in June 1918. A monument to Vladimir Lenin is on the Railway Station Square.

Steam locomotive YeL 629 is set on plinth as a memorial to three Bolshevik revolutionaries (Lazo, Lutsky, and Sibirtsev) who were allegedly burned alive by the White Guards in its firebox in 1920.

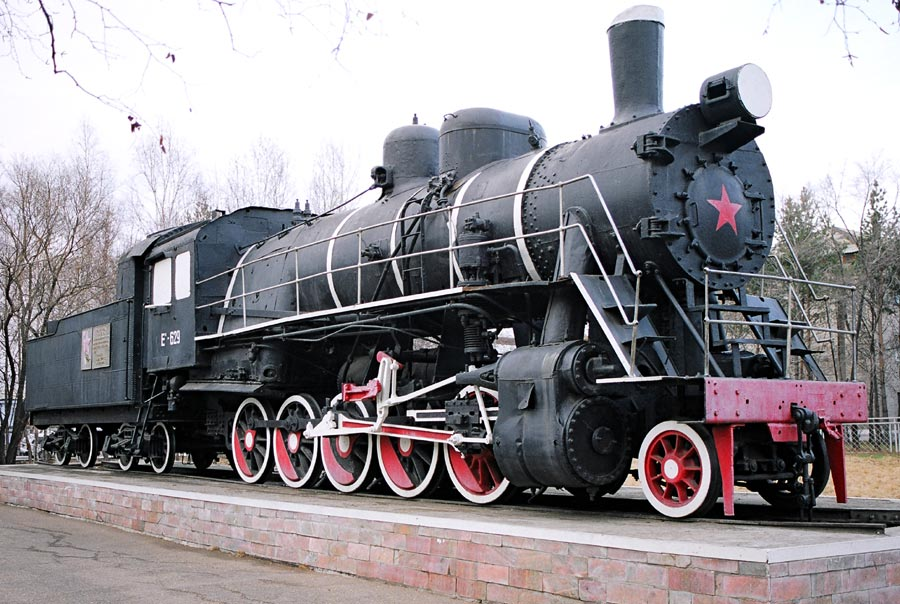
Steam Locomotive YeL 629 in Ussuriysk

The Intercession Church at #80A Chicherina St. was built in 1914. It is the only religious building in the krai that has been kept without any reconstruction since 1917 and is used for its original purpose.

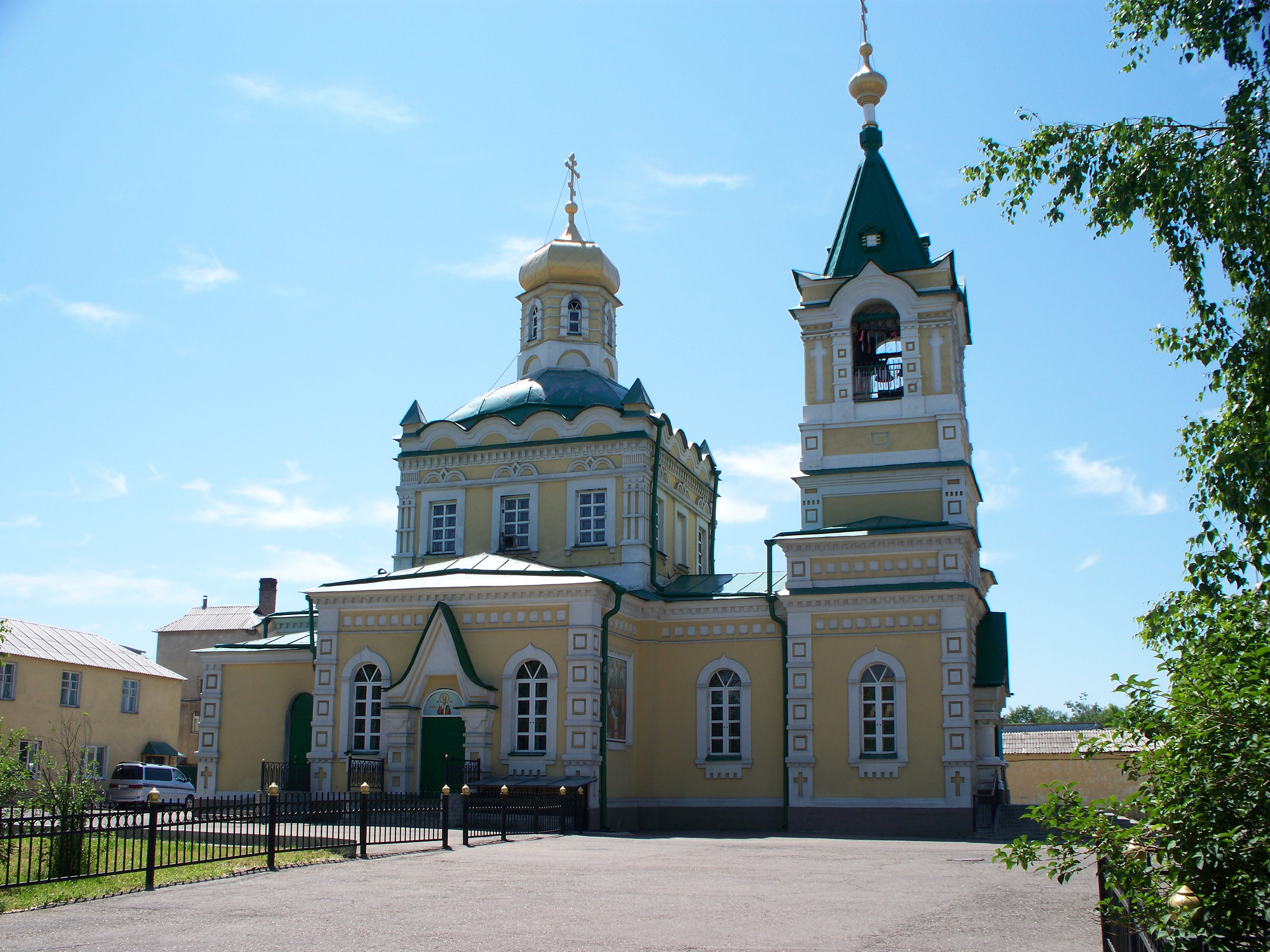
The city's main Intercession Church. Built in 1914, it is one of the few churches in the region to have survived the revolution and Communist periods

== Landscape ==
Ussuriysk is very green because of many trees (such as poplars, elms, and jasmine, that were transplanted here from the taiga) and ranked third after Arsenyev and Vladivostok.

== Notable people ==
- Aleksandr Dvornikov (born 1961), army general
- Nikos Kavvadias (1910–1975), Greek poet
- Renata Kambolina (1998–2015), college student and drummer
- Ivan Miroshnichenko (born 2004), ice hockey forward

== Twin towns and sister cities ==
Ussuriysk is twinned with:

- Mudanjiang, China
- Changwon, South Korea
- Mount Pearl, Canada
- (United States) Fairplay, Colorado

== See also ==
- Ussuriysk Astrophysical Observatory
- Ussuriysk railway station
