= 62nd Guards Rifle Division =

- Active: 1943–1946
- Country: Soviet Union
- Branch: Red Army
- Type: Division
- Role: Infantry
- Engagements: World War II; Operation Little Saturn; Ostrogozhsk–Rossosh offensive; Operation Gallop; Third Battle of Kharkov; Battle of the Dnieper; Battle of Korsun–Cherkassy; Uman–Botoșani Offensive; First Jassy-Kishinev Offensive; Second Jassy–Kishinev Offensive; Budapest Offensive; Siege of Budapest; Operation Spring Awakening; Nagykanizsa–Körmend Offensive; Vienna Offensive
- Decorations: Order of the Red Banner; Order of Suvorov; Order of Bogdan Khmelnitsky
- Battle honours: Zvenigorodka; Budapest

Commanders
- Notable commanders: Maj. Gen. Georgii Mikhailovich Zaitsev; Col. Ivan Nikonovich Moshlyak; Maj. Gen. Grigory Panchenko

The 62nd Guards Rifle Division was formed as an elite infantry division of the Red Army in January, 1943, based on the 2nd formation of the 127th Rifle Division, and served in that role until after the end of the Great Patriotic War.

The division was in the 6th Army of Southwestern Front on the day it was redesignated but was assigned to the 3rd Tank Army of Voronezh Front the following day. This force was badly damaged in Army Group South's counteroffensive south of Kharkov in March, 1943 and the division had to be withdrawn for a substantial rebuilding before being reassigned to the 26th Guards Rifle Corps of 6th Army back in Southwestern Front. It saw little action before being withdrawn again to the Reserve of the Supreme High Command and moved to the 37th Army which joined Steppe Front in September, fighting towards the Dniepr River and playing a leading role in a successful crossing in the Soloshino to Mishurin Rog area. During the month-long battle for Cherkassy at the end of the year the division served in the 52nd Army. In January, 1944 the 62nd Guards was reassigned to the 4th Guards Army and remained under that command for most of the duration of the war. It was awarded a battle honor and soon after its first decoration for its part in the battles for the Korsun–Cherkassy Pocket and within weeks also received the Order of the Red Banner after forcing a crossing of the Dniestr River. When the final offensive that drove Romania out of the Axis began the division was in the 21st Guards Rifle Corps of 4th Guards Army, in 2nd Ukrainian Front. During the campaigns in Hungary in the winter of 1944-45 it took part in the encirclement of Budapest, helped fight off several Axis attempts to break the siege, and eventually received its name as a second honorific. The 62nd Guards picked up a third decoration advancing into northern Hungary and Austria and took part in the fighting for Vienna; despite this admirable record of service the division was disbanded in July, 1946.

== Formation ==
The 127th was redesignated as the 62nd Guards on January 15 and officially received its Guards banner in February. Once the division completed its reorganization its order of battle was as follows:

- 182nd Guards Rifle Regiment (from 547th Rifle Regiment)
- 184th Guards Rifle Regiment (from 549th Rifle Regiment)
- 186th Guards Rifle Regiment (from 555th Rifle Regiment)
- 131st Guards Artillery Regiment (from 1034th Artillery Regiment)
- 69th Guards Antitank Battalion (later 69th Guards Self-Propelled Artillery Battalion)
- 64th Guards Reconnaissance Company
- 71st Guards Sapper Battalion
- 90th Guards Signal Battalion
- 67th Guards Medical/Sanitation Battalion
- 65th Guards Chemical Defense (Anti-gas) Company
- 61st Guards Motor Transport Company
- 66th Guards Field Bakery
- 63rd Guards Divisional Veterinary Hospital
- 1967th Field Postal Station
- 1156th Field Office of the State Bank

Col. Georgii Mikhailovich Zaitsev, who had led the 127th since mid-April, 1942, remained in command of the division and was promoted to the rank of major general on January 19. At the start of January the 127th had been in 6th Army of Southwestern Front, but the new 62nd Guards was moved to the 3rd Tank Army in Voronezh Front on January 16 on the fourth day of the Ostrogozhsk–Rossosh offensive. 3rd Tank still had the early mixed tank army composition with five rifle divisions, the others being the 48th Guards, 111th, 160th and 184th.

== Third Battle of Kharkov ==
On January 21 the commander of Southwestern Front and coordinator of the Red Army offensive on this sector, Col. Gen. N. F. Vatutin, sent his Report No. 00179/op to the STAVKA containing his plan to liberate Kharkov. It stated in part:

1. In carrying out your instructions, the Voronezh Front's left-wing forces (3rd Tank Army and 18th Rifle Corps)... will arrive by 25 January with their main forces at the line Novy Oskol--Valuyki--Pokrovskoe. The 3rd Tank Army, consisting of two tank corps (12th and 15th), an independent tank brigade, five rifle divisions... and the 6th Guards Cavalry Corps... will be ready to launch an attack on Kharkov by 28 January.

The report further stated that 3rd Tank would launch its main attack in the direction of Valuyki and Merefa with the intention of outflanking and taking the city from the southwest. The 62nd Guards was one of four rifle divisions to be in the first echelon of the advance and while the mobile units were to capture Kharkov on the fifth or sixth day the rifle divisions were expected to arrive on the eighth or ninth day.

Due to winter conditions and supply difficulties the Front's offensive did not meet the pace laid down by Vatutin on January 21, but in his Report No. 0054 late on February 16 he was able to state that: "As a result of five days of intensive fighting and having routed the enemy's pick SS units by an attack from the west, east and southeast, our forces captured the city of Kharkov during the first half of the day." The report went on to state that the 12th Tank Corps and 111th Rifle Division had cleared the southeastern part of the city and that the 62nd Guards was being left as a garrison while the remainder of 3rd Tank was moving on to a line from Pesochin to Korotich to Berezovoe to Yuzhnyi. On the afternoon of February 19 Soviet reconnaissance aircraft began to report concentrations of German armor in the Krasnograd area, but this was interpreted as preparations for a withdrawal.

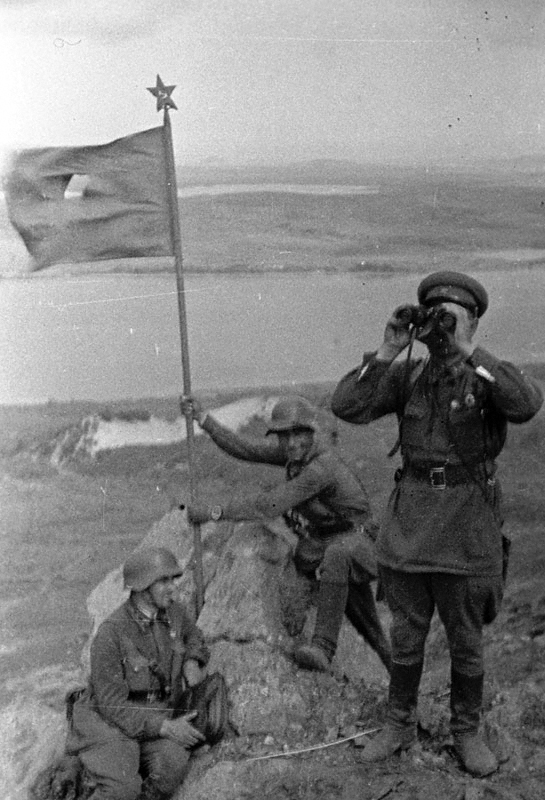
Lieutenant I. N. Moshlyak (center) and two Soviet soldiers on Zaozernaya Hill after the Battle of Lake Khasan.

The German Army Group South began its offensive the next day, striking the right flank of 6th Army as General Vatutin forbade any withdrawal despite his forces being significantly weakened after months of fighting; as an example two tank brigades of 3rd Tank had just six tanks operational between them. The situation worsened over the following days as the German forces drove to the north and on the afternoon of February 28 broke through to the Donets River. 3rd Tank was now moved to Southwestern Front for an ill-fated counterattack on the panzer forces ripping into 6th Army but by March 4, with only about 50 tanks remaining, was almost entirely surrounded itself. 6th Army, despite heavy losses, fell back to the Donets between Andreyevka (northwest of Izium) and Kransnyi Lyman. On March 7 the 4th Panzer Army began its drive on Kharkov and during the next 48 hours created a 30 km-wide (19 mi) gap between 69th Army and the remnants of 3rd Tank, whose rifle divisions were contesting this advance as best they could. The 1st Czechoslovak Independent Battalion, attached to 3rd Tank, was now fighting southwest of Kharkov in the Merefa area between the 62nd and 25th Guards Divisions. By March 10 German units were in the northern suburbs of Kharkov and the division was forced to fall back towards the Donets.

In the course of this withdrawal, General Zaitsev suffered a broken leg from enemy fire while visiting an observation post. He was discovered and taken prisoner on March 16 and spent the rest of the war in German camps. Liberated by the US Army in May, 1945 he was repatriated and arrested by the NKVD before being cleared of any wrongdoing by December. He went on to study at the Frunze Military Academy and eventually retired in 1955. On April 5 he was succeeded in command of the division by Col. Ivan Nikonovich Moshlyak, who had been made a Hero of the Soviet Union as a lieutenant in 1938 following the Battle of Lake Khasan. The division had rejoined the battered 6th Army on March 17 and as of April 1 was part of the 30th Rifle Corps. Later that month it was reassigned to the 26th Guards Rifle Corps where it remained into July when it was withdrawn into the Reserve of the Supreme High Command for rebuilding, joining the 37th Army. When this was completed the 62nd Guards was noted as having 40 percent Russian personnel, while the remaining 60 percent were of several Asian nationalities, and 60 percent were very young men of the year groups 1923–24.

== Battles for the Dniepr ==
By the beginning of September the 37th Army had organized all four of its divisions (62nd, 92nd, 110th Guards and 53rd Rifle) into the 57th Rifle Corps. As the Red Army advanced through eastern Ukraine that month the Army was released from the Reserve of the Supreme High Command to reinforce Steppe Front (as of October 20 2nd Ukrainian Front). The Army began its offensive operation on September 24 along the approaches to the Dniepr River in conjunction with the neighboring 53rd and 7th Guards Armies.

Steppe Front was facing the German 8th Army and part of the 1st Panzer Army which at this time were withdrawing toward Kremenchug in order to cross the Dniepr and organize a defense on its right (west) bank. 37th Army was in the Front's second echelon and was tasked with seizing a bridgehead southeast of that city following initial crossings by 69th Army. This Army had been weakened in previous fighting and was disregarded as a threat by the German command. 37th Army's commander, Lt. Gen. M. N. Sharokhin, was ordered to force march to the 69th's sector and capture a bridgehead between Uspenskoye and Mishurin Rog on September 27. For this purpose the Army was heavily reinforced from the 69th Army, including the 89th Guards Rifle Division and a great deal of artillery. As of September 25 the 62nd Guards recorded a strength of 8,368 men; 491 light and 166 heavy machine guns; 85 82mm and 24 120mm mortars; 41 45mm antitank guns; 36 76mm cannons and 12 122mm howitzers. This was very similar to that of the other Guards divisions in 57th Corps.

At the end of September 25 the division was 45 km (28 mi) from the Dniepr and was to relieve units of the 69th Army's 93rd Guards Rifle Division by the end of the next day and reach a line from Ozery to Prosyanikovka while its forward detachments were to force the river and seize a bridgehead from Lake Liman to height 172. Each forward detachment consisted of a rifle battalion reinforced by an artillery battalion, two batteries of antitank guns and a sapper platoon, all loaded on or towed by trucks. Due to the Army's lack of crossing equipment the forward detachments were forced to rely on improvised means, and this lack would cause difficulties throughout the division's crossing operations. Its forward detachments reached the east bank as early as 0200 hours on September 27 and immediately began gathering crossing materials. General Sharokhin and a group of staff officers soon arrived at Ozery and organized an auxiliary command post. 37th Army's crossing sector was 29 km (18 mi) wide and the Army had a total of 1,204 guns and mortars available, although a significant number of these had fallen behind due to shortages of fuel. 57th Corps had about 655 guns and mortars available to support the crossings of the forward detachments. The 182nd Guards Rifle Regiment had an infantry-support artillery group consisting of the 1st and 3rd Battalions of the 131st Guards Artillery Regiment plus the attached 1658th Antitank Artillery Regiment, while the 184th Guards Regiment was backed by the 2nd Battalion of the 131st and the 417th Antitank Artillery Regiment; most of this was deployed for direct fire support. Colonel Moshlyak also had a battalion of Guards Mortars at his disposal. Crossing equipment had been mostly removed or destroyed by the retreating German forces, leaving eight small fishing boats, and 20 small rafts were built from available materials between the 62nd and 92nd Guards; the former was also allocated three bow half-pontoons and five boats from Army engineer stores. Altogether the division could lift up to 150 men and three 76mm regimental guns with limbers at the same time. Without taking into account possible losses the forward detachments could reach the right bank in 5-6 trips over 4-6 hours.

During the afternoon of the 27th General Sharokhin carried out a reconnaissance along with his senior staff, the commander of 57th Corps, Maj. Gen. A. I. Petrakovskii, Colonel Moshlyak, and the deputy commander of the 92nd Guards. Most details of the operation were worked out, with particular attention to the 62nd Guards which was leading the axis of the Corps' main attack. Its mission was refined to forcing the river along the sector of the island southwest of Soloshino to Mishurin Rog and to occupy a line from the northeastern outskirts of Kutsevolovka to height 172.0 with its forward detachments. These were to cross from 0400 to 0600 hours on September 28; artillery support was to be available from 0200 hours but was to fire only if summoned and only in case the crossing was discovered. Sharokhin ordered the use of smokescreens for cover during the day. The width of the forcing sector was 12 km (7.5 mi) and the depth of the operation was 5 km (3.1 mi).

The division's forward detachments were based on the 2nd Battalion of the 182nd Guards Regiment and the 3rd Battalion of the 184th Regiment. The crossing was to begin at 0200 hours but was delayed for reconnaissance; in the event the reconnaissance party became disoriented in the dark and failed to carry out its assignment. Despite this setback the crossing proceeded at 0400 hours. The right bank was loosely covered by elements of the 8th SS Cavalry Division Florian Geyer. The 182nd landed 150 men from half-pontoons on the north bank of the island with marker 63.0 (southwest of Soloshino) while the 184th put 100 men across on five A-3 boats at a jetty north of Mishurin Rog, 9 km (5.6 mi) downstream. Neither landing was detected until it was completed. After a brief firefight with a German security detachment the island was secured and Soviet artillery soon intervened to support the forces at the jetty. As the crossings continued some of the half-pontoons used outboard motors to speed up movement while many men used rafts, boards, logs, empty fuel barrels and other improvised means to get across. By 0800 hours the 2nd Battalion of the 182nd had crossed the channel from the island to the right bank and had seized a bridgehead 2 km (1.2 mi) wide and up to 1000m in depth. The Regiment's 3rd Battalion crossed behind it without any pause. By 1300 hours the two battalions had beaten off three German counterattacks and penetrated to the southeastern bank of Lake Liman, while the 3rd Battalion of the 184th repelled an infantry counterattack and expanded its bridgehead as well.

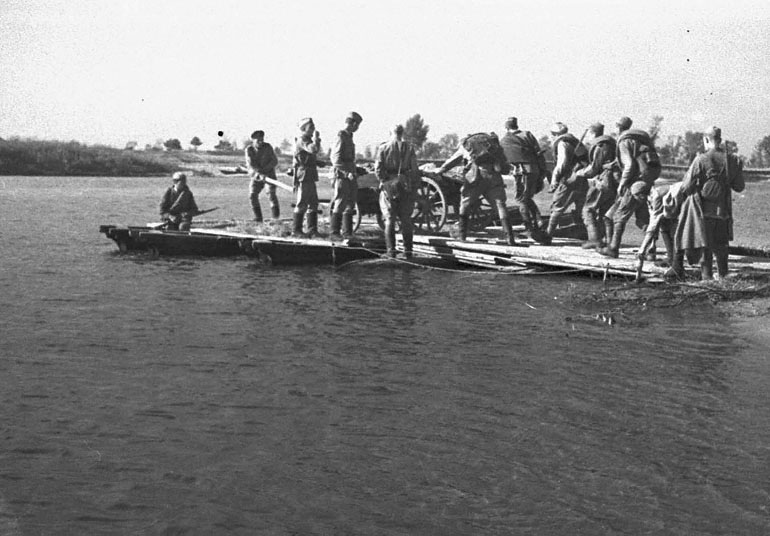
Soviet soldiers crossing the Dniepr on improvised rafts.

As of noon the 127th Engineer-Sapper Battalion began to arrive on the left bank with six landing boats and a three-boat ferry which sped up the crossing of heavy equipment. However, by early afternoon the German forces had brought up artillery and mortars to the crossing sites which began sinking or damaging a significant amount of the crossing equipment. From 1300 to 1700 hours the 182nd Regiment was unable to reinforce its bridgehead while the 184th still had only two companies across. Under these circumstances Sharokhin decided on a ruse. He ordered the remaining boats and pontoons to be shifted to unobserved crossing points while the established crossings were to act as diversions to distract attention. After 1700 hours, as more equipment arrived, the 62nd Guards was able to speed up its crossing. By the end of the day the 182nd's bridgehead was 4–6 km (2.5–3.7 mi) deep and 5–6 km (3.1–3.7 mi) wide, while the 184th held a sector up to 1.5 km (0.93 mi) deep and 2 km (1.2 mi) wide. Up to 16 regimental guns and most of the remaining infantry of the two regiments had also been carried into their bridgeheads.

Among the many men who distinguished themselves during this operation was Jr. Sgt. Ivan Sergeevich Starykh of the 71st Guards Sapper Battalion. Following the landing of the 2nd Battalion of the 182nd Regiment on the island with marker 63.0 one of the half-pontoons in use was damaged by German fire and its crew was injured or killed. Starykh led his squad in taking over operation of the craft and managed, despite casualties, to transport two rifle and one machine gun companies, plus a regimental gun, to the right bank before he was killed by German artillery fire. Starykh was buried near Soloshino and on February 22, 1944 was posthumously made a Hero of the Soviet Union.

The main goal of 37th Army on September 29-30 was to expand the existing bridgeheads, consolidate them, and repel increasingly powerful counterattacks. Overnight on September 28/29 the 110th Guards Division was committed from the Corps' second echelon. The 62nd Guards, together with its two attached antitank regiments, was tasked with completing the crossing of its main forces by morning and then to go over to the offensive to occupy a line from height 168.0 to Mishurin Rog by the end of the day. Due to the ongoing shortage of crossing equipment the 131st Guards Artillery and the attached regiments were forced to remain on the east bank and support the attacking troops from their previous positions. Despite this support the division was unable to carry out the Army's objective due to continuing infantry and armor counterattacks. By the end of the day the 182nd Regiment was fighting for Kutsevolovka, the 186th had captured height 156.9, and the 184th had taken the northern part of Mishurin Rog and reached the northern slopes of height 177.6. During the day elements of the 23rd Panzer Division began arriving in the Mishurin Rog area. Overnight on September 29/30 the 92nd Guards' 282nd Guards Rifle Regiment was landed in the 62nd Guards bridgehead east of Derievka, while the remainder of the division's own forces, apart from the 131st Artillery, crossed as well.

Heavy fighting for the bridgehead began at dawn. 23rd Panzer had been ordered to eliminate the foothold, and began with two attacks from 0500 to 0600 hours with up to a battalion of infantry backed by 20 tanks from the Nezamozhnik area. These attacks were beaten off by artillery and machine gun fire but a renewed effort from Kaluzhino at 1100 hours managed to break through with 15 tanks and 11 Sd.Kfz. 251 vehicles carrying infantry to the area of height 127.5. A decisive counterattack drove these off; overall the division repulsed eight powerful attacks during the day but also lost some ground due to insufficient antitank artillery. Ammunition was also in short supply. Despite these factors by the end of September 30 the division's bridgehead had expanded to 15 km (9.3 mi) in width and up to 5–6 km (3.1–3.7 mi) in depth. Sharokhin was ordered to step up the transfer of heavy equipment to his bridgeheads, especially due to intelligence that the Großdeutschland Division was arriving southeast of Mishurin Rog.

On October 1 the Army's 82nd Rifle Corps began crossing into the bridgeheads from second echelon. 62nd Guards was expected to destroy the German forces that had broken through in the Mishurin Rog area while the 10th Guards Airborne Division concentrated southeast of that village and also at Kaluzhino. In the event the division fought off further attacks during the morning and was only able to make minor gains during the afternoon while finally getting all its divisional and attached artillery across the river. Although Mishurin Rog was cleared by the 10th Guards Airborne and 110th Guards the 3rd SS Panzergrenadier Division Totenkopf was arriving to help contain and eliminate the bridgeheads. The first echelon units of 57th Corps resumed the offensive the following day and the 62nd Guards captured Nezamozhnik. By now the 7th Guards Army, which had crossed the Dniepr to the southeast of 37th Army, was facing a crisis on its right flank due to German counterattacks and on October 3 the division was directed toward Vasilyevka farm and Likhovka to link up with 7th Guards' main forces. This effort was preempted by the arrival of the 6th Panzer Division and its subsequent attacks. During the day the 1st Mechanized Corps began crossing into the Mishurin Rog - Kaluzhino area followed by the 188th Rifle Division overnight. On the morning of October 4 the 37th Army had five rifle divisions, three mechanized and one tank brigades, a tank regiment, 538 guns and 63 tanks on the right bank, facing two infantry and three panzer divisions, including about 150 tanks. The 57th Corps was heavily counterattacked during the day but held its ground. By now the bridgehead was from 20–25 km (12–16 mi) wide and up to 8 km (5.0 mi) deep and four ferry crossings were operating regularly, out of range of aimed fire from German artillery.

Between October 5-10 the main efforts of 1st Panzer Army were directed at 7th Guards Army while 37th Army repeatedly attacked in order to link up with it. During this period the divisions of 57th Corps, which had taken considerable casualties in their crossing operations, were mainly tasked with holding and gradually expanding the bridgehead. By the end of October 9 the last elements of the Army had crossed the Dniepr apart from part of its heavy artillery. German attacks were much reduced the next day as the strength of the panzer divisions had been blunted and they went over to the defense. The Army's bridgehead was now up to 35 km (22 mi) wide and as much as 12 km (7.5 mi) deep. The Front commander, Army Gen. I. S. Konev, now ordered the 5th Guards Army to move from the northwest to enter the bridgehead for a new offensive operation. During the second half of the month the two armies, in close coordination with 3rd Ukrainian Front, advanced into the Dniepr bend towards Kirovograd and Krivoi Rog.

=== Battle of Cherkassy ===
As of the start of November the 62nd Guards had left 57th Corps and was a separate division in 37th Army. Kiev was liberated by 1st Ukrainian Front on November 6, and 2nd Ukrainian began a new Dniepr crossing operation with its 52nd Army on November 13 with the objective of taking the city of Cherkassy. On November 20 the Army headquarters ordered a new effort to capture the city with the 254th, 294th and 373rd Rifle Divisions. This attack was organized hastily, and the Soviet forces had no advantage in manpower. In the early going a regiment of the 373rd captured the Shevchenko Collective Farm. This was followed by heavy counterattacks, and by nightfall this regiment, along with the rest of the Army's forces, had to fall back to their jumping-off positions. A further attack on the city overnight on November 21-22 was also unsuccessful. On November 24 the Army received reinforcements in the form of the 62nd Guards and the 7th Guards Airborne Divisions. While the latter joined the 73rd Rifle Corps the 62nd remained in the Army's reserve. Being very short of personnel it was taking in replacements near the town of Domantov and did not cross into the bridgehead until the end of the month, when it joined the 373rd in the 78th Rifle Corps.

By 1100 hours on November 28 the 52nd Army had surrounded the German forces in Cherkassy, but an ultimatum to surrender was rejected. The next day it was learned from prisoner interrogations that the 3rd Panzer Division and other reinforcements had arrived at Smela to restore contact with the Cherkassy garrison, which succeeded on December 1. As the efforts to cut off the relief corridor began on December 3 the 186th Guards Regiment moved up to become Lt. Gen. K. A. Koroteyev's reserve and the following day the 131st Guards Artillery Regiment entered the bridgehead. The final attack to clear Cherkassy began at 0830 hours on December 9, following an artillery preparation better organized than previous efforts. The Army's shock group was supported by the 62nd Guards and a battalion of the 186th Regiment remained as Koroteyev's reserve. The division's main forces beat off two German attacks from the south and by the day's end were holding their positions. By December 13 the German command realized its position in the city was untenable and ordered its troops to pull out towards Smela. Cherkassy was completely liberated early in the morning of December 14.

== Into Western Ukraine ==
Later that month the division was reassigned again, now to the 73rd Corps, still in 52nd Army. In January, 1944 it was moved to the 20th Guards Rifle Corps of 4th Guards Army, still in 2nd Ukrainian Front, and it would remain in this Army for most of the duration of the war. On January 25 the 4th Guards and 53rd Army began a new offensive against the German 8th Army southwest of Cherkassy, setting the stage for the double envelopment of the XXXXII and XI Army Corps in the Korsun-Shevchenkovskii area which was closed on January 28 in conjunction with forces of 1st Ukrainian Front. Before the German relief attempt began on February 4, as the Army was establishing an outer ring of encirclement, the division was awarded its first honorific:

ZVENIGORODKA... 62nd Guards Rifle Division (Colonel Moshlyak, Ivan Nikonovich)... The troops who participated in the liberation of Zvenigorodka and nearby towns, by the order of the Supreme High Command of 3 February 1944, and a commendation in Moscow, are given a salute of 20 artillery salvoes from 224 guns.

The fighting for the Korsun Pocket continued until February 17 by which time about 30,000 German troops had managed to escape, roughly half of those originally encircled. In recognition of its role in this victory the division was awarded the Order of Bogdan Khmelnitsky, 2nd Degree, on February 26.

=== Battles on the Dniestr ===
As of March 1 the division had been transferred to the 21st Guards Rifle Corps, where it would remain for most of the rest of the war. It now pressed on westward during the Uman–Botoșani Offensive and arrived at the Dniestr River late during that month and crossed it north of Rîbnița, arriving with its Army on the northern approaches to Orhei and the Reut River on April 2; at this time it was part of the 20th Guards Rifle Corps. On April 8 the 62nd Guards was decorated for its part in the forcing of the Dniestr with the Order of the Red Banner.

At dawn on April 3 the five divisions of 20th Guards Corps, along with three of the 21st Guards Corps, attacked towards Orhei and Chișinău but gained only 3–5 km (1.9–3.1 mi) against stiffening German resistance from the XXXX and XXXXVII Panzer Corps. The history of 4th Guards Army described the difficulties during its advance:

Overcoming the increasing enemy resistance became more difficult because our forces had inadequate artillery support and ammunition. Of the army's 700 guns no more than 200 of them were in their firing positions. The remainder lagged behind... No less difficult was the process of supplying ammunition to the artillery... We used every conceivable means of transport, including carrying the shells forward by hand.

On April 5 the Army commander, Lt. Gen. I. V. Galanin, resumed the offensive. The 62nd Guards, along with the 5th and 6th Guards Airborne and 41st Guards Rifle Divisions, assaulted the defenses of the 13th and 3rd Panzer Divisions west and north of Orhei but made only modest gains in heavy fighting. The next day the 5th Guards Airborne and 41st Guards managed to seize the city but the arrival of the 11th Panzer Division halted any further advance. Marshal Konev was determined to take Chișinău and on April 8 Galanin ordered his two Guards corps to assault and crush the positions of 3rd Panzer south of Susleni. Over two days the German defenses were pounded by artillery and mortar fire and repeated ground assaults but XXXX Panzer Corps threw in reserves to stabilise the situation. On April 11 a few gains were made and by the end of the next day the pressure forced a German withdrawal south of the Reut, but by now the 4th Guards Army was so depleted from months of fighting that it was no longer capable of offensive operations; the 62nd Guards, like the Army's other divisions, was down to roughly 5,000 personnel. On April 18 Konev authorized Galanin to go over to the defense.

=== Second Jassy-Kishinev Offensive ===
In June the 62nd Guards returned to the 21st Guards Rifle Corps. Prior to the start of the August offensive that forced Romania out of the Axis the Corps was transferred to the 52nd Army, still in 2nd Ukrainian Front. The Corps deployed on a 3 km-wide (1.9 mi) assault front with the 62nd and 69th Guards Rifle Divisions in the first echelon and the 254th Division in second. The Corps had a total of 915 guns and mortars in support, with 427 (including 82mm mortars) backing the 62nd. The Army's front lines were roughly 16 km (9.9 mi) due north of Iași. The 18th Tank Corps was in the Army's reserve and was expected to enter the breach in the Axis lines once the Bahlui River was reached.

Following an artillery preparation which lasted an hour and 40 minutes the offensive began on the morning of August 20. The 52nd Army broke through the Axis defense along a 12 km (7.5 mi) front, advancing 16 km (9.9 mi) during the day, forcing the Bahlui in the process and ending the day fighting along the northern outskirts of Iași in the area of the railway station. The main efforts of the defenders were to prevent a breakthrough to the city but the 21st Guards Corps was able to reach a line from south of Kozjacka Nou to Munteni, facing south. The following day the 73rd Rifle Corps was to capture Iași while the 21st Guards Corps paved the way for the 18th Tank Corps. It then attacked along the southern bank of the Bahlui and by the end of the day reached a line from Mogoșești to Ciurea. During August 22 the 18th Tanks broke into the clear and advanced more than 50 km (31 mi) towards Huși, which eased the way for the 62nd Guards and 254th Divisions to reach from Rediul to Cuiaba. One regiment of the division received a battle honor for its part in the fighting to date:

YASSI... 182nd Guards Rifle Regiment (Major Grozov, Mikhail Trofomovich)... The troops who participated in the liberation of the region of Yassi, by the order of the Supreme High Command of 22 August 1944, and a commendation in Moscow, are given a salute of 20 artillery salvoes from 224 guns.

Overnight the Axis forces in the Iași area attempted to withdraw to a new line along the left bank of the Deia River but were unsuccessful due to the pace of the 52nd Army's advance. On August 23 the Army advanced significantly, pushing aside small enemy rearguards and mopping up units that had been scattered by 18th Tanks. By the end of the day the 21st Guards Corps, with the 62nd Guards and 254th Divisions still in first echelon, had pushed south of Vaslui to Bahnari to east of Solești. The following day the Army continued to develop the offensive and the Corps encountered only insignificant resistance, reaching a line from Vutcani to Hurdugi.

By now the 2nd and 3rd Ukrainian Fronts had jointly encircled the Axis Chișinău group of forces, most of which was east of the Prut. The plan for this group of about 70,000 personnel was to force the Prut in the Huși area and then to break through to reach Hungarian territory. The task of preventing this and destroying the Axis forces in the Huși area fell to the 52nd Army. On August 24 the 21st Guards Corps was directed to occupy a line from Berezeni to Stănilești by the morning of the next day which gave each first echelon division a 14 km-wide (8.7 mi) frontage to cover. By the end of August 25 the 62nd Guards' right flank reached the Prut and fought for and occupied Satu Nou, Vicoleni and Berezeni and was fighting for Mușata. In the process of the advance on August 24 the cities of Huși, Bacău, Bârlad and Roman were all occupied and on September 15 the 186th Guards Rifle Regiment would be recognized with the award of the Order of the Red Banner while the 184th Guards Regiment received the Order of Alexander Nevsky.

The German XXXXIV, XXX and LII Army Corps planned to start their breakout at midnight on August 24/25 in the general direction of Huși. Command and control had broken down in the encircled grouping and the escape efforts were widely scattered; heavy equipment was being abandoned or destroyed at the Prut. The withdrawal continued into the next night as the three Corps split into separate combat groups while the 21st Guards Corps reached a line from Murgeni to Fălciu to Berezeni and joined hands with the 3rd Ukrainian Front while part of its forces turned north to combat German forces in woods southwest of Huși. On August 27 the Corps beat off German attacks south and southwest of Hurdugi while continuing to hold defensive positions along the Prut. From this date until September 5 the 52nd Army was involved in completing the elimination of the Chișinău group. During the afternoon of the 28th a significant group of German troops managed to push south on a road to Vutcani despite resistance from 21st Guards Corps and consequent heavy losses. At the end of the day the 62nd Guards had one regiment holding along the Prut from Fălciu to Berezeni with the remainder of its forces fighting east of Corni, facing southwest.

Remnants of five German divisions which had managed to break through to Vutcani began a withdrawal through the rear areas of 2nd Ukrainian Front on August 29 with 21st Guards Corps in pursuit as far as the Bârlad River; the 62nd Guards reached a line from height 211 to 2 km (1.2 mi) west of Roșiești. The German objective now was to cross the Siret River, and broke up into small detachments for the purpose. The total strength of these detachments was roughly 10,000 men, but between September 1-4 these were eliminated before they could cross the Trotuș River.

== Into the Balkans ==
On September 5 the 52nd Army, along with the 62nd Guards, was withdrawn into the Reserve of the Supreme High Command. The division was well under strength and was rebuilt over the following months. Later in the month the 21st Guards Corps returned to the 4th Guards Army, which was also in the Reserve. During this time the 69th Guards Antitank Battalion was reequipped with SU-76s and was redesignated as the 69th Guards Self-Propelled Artillery Battalion. When the 4th Guards Army returned to the front in November it was part of the 3rd Ukrainian Front. As the division advanced into Hungary and prepared to force a crossing of the Danube on November 24 it was in the Corps' second echelon southeast of Baja. The 41st Guards Rifle Division led the Corps across the river in the Mohács area, followed by the 62nd and 69th Guards on November 29. On December 2 the division took part in the capture of Kaposvár and on January 6, 1945 the 182nd Guards Rifle Regiment would be awarded the Order of Kutuzov, 3rd Degree, the 184th Guards Regiment received the Order of Suvorov, 3rd Degree, and the 131st Guards Artillery Regiment was presented with the Order of Alexander Nevsky.

As of December 19 the Front had completed its preparations for the third stage of its operation to encircle and eliminate the German-Hungarian Budapest group of forces. 4th Guards Army occupied a 44 km (27 mi) line from Lake Velence to Lake Balaton with 21st Guards Corps while the 62nd Guards was located on the Army's secondary axis from the Sárvíz Canal to Lake Balaton. By December 26 the Hungarian capital had been encircled, the remaining Axis forces had been forced back up to 40 km (25 mi) from the city, and the 4th Guards Army, along with the 5th Guards Cavalry Corps, had created an external front covering the siege from the west and had captured several strongpoints on the approaches to Székesfehérvár and Kisfalud. By the end of December it had the former place surrounded on three sides before going over to the defense. At this time the 21st Guards Corps was facing the Hungarian 25th Infantry Division, the 44th Training Regiment and the 85th Landing Battalion.

Before dawn on January 2 the IV SS Panzer Corps began Operation Konrad I in an attempt to relieve Budapest. The German forces attacked from the direction of Tata and 4th Guards Army took emergency measures to shore up its right flank; among these the 69th Guards extended its frontage to free up the 62nd Guards to move into reserve in the Székesfehérvár area, leaving its Corps to come under direct Army control. Its commander, Army Gen. G. F. Zakharov, was determined to halt the German drive northwest of Bicske and created a new defensive line in depth containing the 62nd, 4th and 80th Guards Rifle Divisions, backed by 49th Antitank Artillery Regiment. In the event this phase of the offensive was halted by January 6 by the 31st Guards Rifle Corps.

The second phase of Operation Konrad began on January 7 as the German command shifted the 23rd Panzer Division northwest of Székesfehérvár along with the rest of the III Panzer Corps. It was soon apparent that the immediate goal of the offensive was Bicske and on the morning of the next day Zakharov relieved the 41st Guards, which had suffered heavy losses, with the 62nd Guards along the main axis of the German attack. This phase of the offensive was brought to a halt a few days later. The siege of Budapest ended on February 13 and the division was awarded its second battle honor on the same date.

Following the German Operation Spring Awakening in early March the 4th Guards Army went back to the offensive. On March 24 Colonel Moshlyak left command of the division and was replaced the next day by Maj. Gen. Grigory Panchenko; Moshlyak went on to the Voroshilov Academy for further education while Panchenko would remain in command until the division was disbanded. On April 26 the 186th Guards Rifle Regiment was awarded the Order of Kutuzov, 3rd Degree, for its role in the retaking of Székesfehérvár, while the division as a whole received the Order of Suvorov, 2nd Degree, for its part in the battles for Szombathely and Kapuvár. On April 28 General Panchenko was made a Hero of the Soviet Union, having earlier distinguished himself in the crossing of the Danube.

== Postwar ==
On April 13 the fighting for the Austrian capital ended and the 184th Guards Rifle Regiment (Lt. Col. Mogilevtsev, Vasilii Semenovich) was awarded its name as an honorific. At the time of the German surrender the men and women of the division held the full official title of 62nd Guards Rifle, Zvenigorodka-Budapest, Order of the Red Banner, Orders of Suvorov and Bogdan Khmelnitsky Division. (Russian: 62-я гвардейская стрелковая Звенигородско-Будапештская Краснознамённая орденов Суворова и Богдана Хмельницкого дивизия.) In final awards after the close of hostilities the 182nd Guards Rifle Regiment received the Order of Suvorov, 3rd Degree, and the 69th Guards Self-Propelled Artillery Battalion was given the Order of Bogdan Khmelnitsky, 3rd Degree, on May 17, both for their roles in the battle for Vienna. According to STAVKA Order No. 11096 of May 29, part 2, the division became part of the Central Group of Forces in Austria, in 20th Guards Rifle Corps, still in 4th Guards Army, and remained there until July, 1946 when it was disbanded.
