= Posyet (disambiguation) =

Posyet may refer to:

- Konstantin Posyet, a Russian statesman and admiral
- Posyet Bay, a bay in the south-western part of the Peter the Great Gulf
  - Posyet, a port and urban-type settlement in Primorsky Kray.
