= Ivan Moshlyak =

Ivan Nikonovich Moshlyak
- Native name: Иван Никонович Мошляк
- Born: 15 October 1907; Rodino, Barnaul Uyezd, Tomsk Governorate, Russian Empire (now Rodinsky District, Altai Krai, Russia)
- Died: 22 April 1981 (aged 73) Leningrad, Russian SFSR, USSR (now Saint Petersburg, Russia)
- Allegiance: Soviet Union
- Branch: Soviet Army
- Service years: 1929–1968
- Rank: Major General
- Commands: 4th Rifle Regiment; 106th Separate Rifle Brigade; 62nd Guards Rifle Division; 45th Guards Rifle Division
- Conflicts: Soviet–Japanese Borders Wars; Battle of Lake Khasan; World War II; Eastern Front
- Awards: Hero of the Soviet Union

Ivan Nikonovich Moshlyak (Russian: Иван Никонович Мошляк; 15 October 1907 – 22 April 1981) was a major general in the Soviet Army who received the title Hero of the Soviet Union for his heroism in the Battle of Lake Khasan during the Soviet–Japanese border conflicts.

== Early life ==
Moshlyak was born on 15 October 1907 in the village of Rodino in Tomsk Governorate, into a peasant family. His father was a veteran of the Russo-Japanese War and moved to Siberia from Ukraine, like most of the villagers. During his childhood, Moshlyak knew the Ukrainian language better than Russian.

He graduated from a rural seven-year school in his native village. Engaged in labor since childhood, he joined the Komsomol in 1929.

== Military career ==
In February 1930, he was drafted into the ranks of the Red Army. He was sent to serve in the 118th Rifle Regiment of the 40th Rifle Division in the Siberian Military District, where it based in Slavgorod. In 1930 he graduated from the regimental school, where he continued to serve. Moshlyak was commander of the department, deputy commander of the platoon, sergeant training battalion and platoon commander of the sniper team. In 1931, the regiment and division in full strength were assigned to the Special Red Banner Far Eastern Army and transferred to the border near the Japanese puppet state of Manchukuo.

With the introduction of military ranks in the Red Army in 1935, he was awarded the rank of junior lieutenant and was promoted to lieutenant two years later.

In 1932 he joined the All-Union Communist Party of Bolsheviks and in 1933 he graduated from the nine-year evening school. In May 1938, he was elected secretary of the regiment's party organization.

=== Battle of Lake Khasan ===
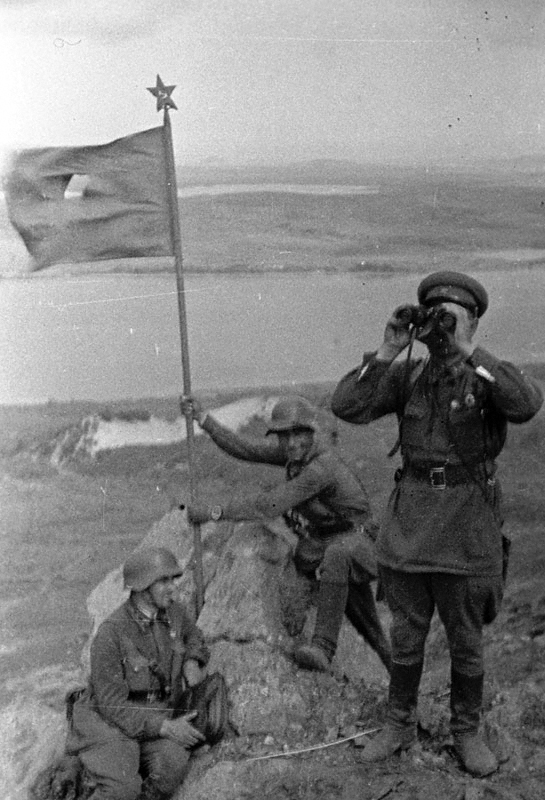
Lieutenant Moshlyak (center) and two Soviet soldiers on Zaozernaya Hill after the battle of Lake Khasan

On 29 July 1938, a series of armed clashes occurred between the Imperial Japanese Army and the Red Army over Japan's dispute of the ownership of territory near Lake Khasan and the Tumen River. This was later known as the Battle of Lake Khasan. In the battles for Zaozernaya Hill on August 8, Moshlyak took the Red Banner from the wounded standard-bearer and was the first to break into the hill, where he hoisted a scarlet cloth on it. Wounded in the head and chest, he did not leave the battlefield and when the battalion commander died, he took command and achieved the fulfillment of the combat mission.

By the decree of the Presidium of the Supreme Soviet of the USSR of 25 October 1938, Lieutenant Moshlyak was awarded the title of Hero of the Soviet Union for heroism and courage shown in battles against Japanese forces.

On 4 November 1938, in the Kremlin, at the awarding of participants in the hostilities near Lake Khasan, Chairman of the Presidium of the Supreme Soviet of the Soviet Union Mikhail Kalinin presented the Moshlyak with the Order of Lenin. In addition, on 4 November 1938, by order of the People's Commissariat of Defense of the Soviet Union Kliment Voroshilov, the most distinguished participants in the battles at Lake Khasan were promoted in military rank and in accordance with this order, Moshlyak was promoted to the military rank of captain.

Due to a serious injury, Moshlyak was in the hospital for treatment until April 1939 and from there he was sent to the academy. In June 1941, he graduated from the two courses of the Frunze Military Academy. In the spring of 1941, he was promoted to major.

=== World War II ===
Following the outbreak of Operation Barbarossa in June 1941, Moshlyak was on a vacation in Crimea. Having reached Moscow by the end of September, he passed the accelerated program of the graduation course of the Frunze Military Academy. In addition to his studies, he was part of the reconnaissance group within the defensive lines of Southwestern Front. At the end of September, he was appointed commander of the 4th Rifle Regiment of the 2nd Moscow Rifle Division of the Stalin region of Moscow. In October 1941, the division arrived at the front as part of the 32nd Army of the Reserve Front, but remained in reserve and was engaged in combat training while at the same time it was transformed into the 2nd Rifle Division. On 7 November 1941, Moshlyak participated in the 1941 October Revolution Parade while serving as the head of the regiment. In November 1941, the division engaged in defensive battles near Kryukovo during the Battle of Moscow.

In December 1941, he was appointed chief of staff of the 106th Rifle Brigade which was formed in the city of Pavlovo. In April 1942, the brigade became part of the 61st Army of the Bryansk Front and fought defensive battles southwest of the city of Belyov. From July 1942, Moshlyak was appointed as the commander of the brigade and participated in the First Battle of Voronezh. He was later promoted to lieutenant colonel and at the end of 1942, as part of the 6th Army of the Southwestern Front, the brigade participated in the Middle Don and Kharkov offensives. During the third Battle of Kharkov, Moshlyak was wounded while escaping the German encirclement in the battle.

On 22 March 22, 1943, he was assigned as commander of the 62nd Guards Rifle Division, which fought on the Southwestern Front. The division was later assigned to the 2nd Ukrainian Front and later from November 1944 with the 3rd Ukrainian Front. While serving with the division, Moshlyak took part in the Izyum–Barvenkovo, Donbas, Zaporizhzhia, Kirovograd, Uman–Botoșani, Second Jassy–Kishinev, Balaton, Budapest and Vienna offensives.

The division distinguished itself during the liberation of the cities of Starobilsk, Izium, Zvenyhorodka, Bonyhád, Székesfehérvár and Győr. For its merits in combat, the division was also awarded the Orders of Bogdan Khmelnitsky 2nd class and the Red Banner.

=== Post war ===
In January 1946, he graduated from the accelerated course of the Higher Military Academy named after K. E. Voroshilov and was appointed deputy commander of the 53rd Guards Rifle Division of the Moscow Military District, but did not take the position since he was still being treated for his war injuries.

From May 1946, he served as deputy commander of the 98th Guards Rifle Division in the Moscow and Far Eastern Military Districts. In November 1946, Moshlyak was appointed as the commander of the newly created 98th Guards Airborne Division. From February 1948, he served as the deputy commander of the 99th Guards Airborne Division in the Far East. In October 1948, he was assigned as the Deputy Commander of the 15th Guards Rifle Division in the Carpathian Military District and from August 1949 to October 1950, he served as the Deputy Commander of the 24th Rifle Division within the same military district.

In October 1952, he graduated from the basic course of the Higher Military Academy named after K. E. Voroshilov and was appointed commander of the 45th Guards Rifle Division of the Leningrad Military District. From July 1958, Moshlyak was appointed as the Deputy Commander for Combat Training and head of the Combat Training Department within the 7th Guards Army of the Transcaucasian Military District. From October 1964, he served as deputy head of the Military Academy of Logistics and Transport for operational-tactical and drill training. In July 1968, Moshlyak was transferred to the reserve.

== Later life ==
After his retirement from military, Moshlyak lived in Leningrad. He died on 22 April 1981 and was buried at the Serafimovskoe Cemetery.

== Awards and decorations ==
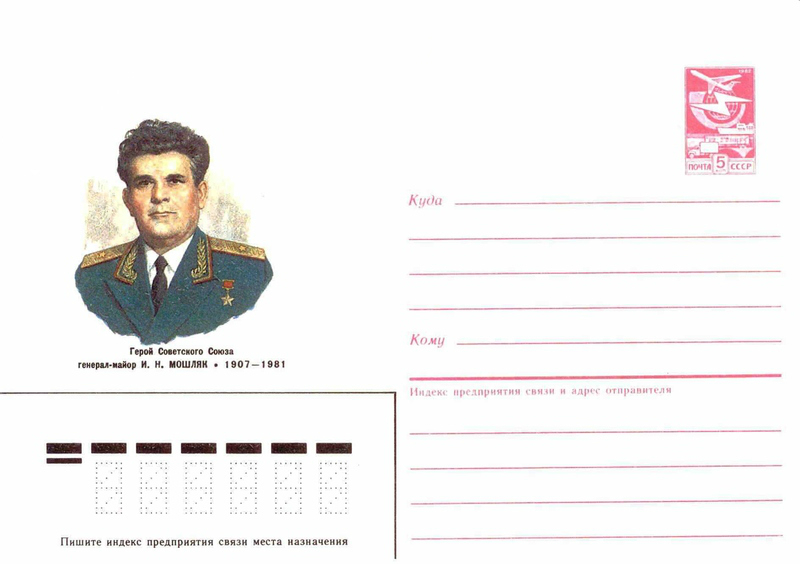
1987 Soviet postal cover honoring Moshlyak

- Hero of the Soviet Union (25 October 1938)
- Order of Lenin, twice (25 October 1938, 5 November 1954)
- Order of the Red Banner, twice (27 February 1944, 15 November 1950)
- Order of Suvorov, 2nd class (25 October 1943)
- Order of Kutuzov, 2nd class (28 April 1945)
- Orders of the Patriotic War, 1st class, twice (15 September 1944, 11 March 1985 [posthumous])
- Order of the Red Banner of Labour
- Order of the Red Star (3 November 1944)
- Order of Tudor Vladimirescu, 2nd class (Romania)
- Officer of the Legion of Merit (United States)
- campaign and jubilee medals

== Bibliography ==
- Kuznetsov, I. I; Dzhoga, I. M. First Heroes of the Soviet Union (1936-1939), 1983
- Encyclopedia of Altai Territory, 1997
