= Port of Zarubino =

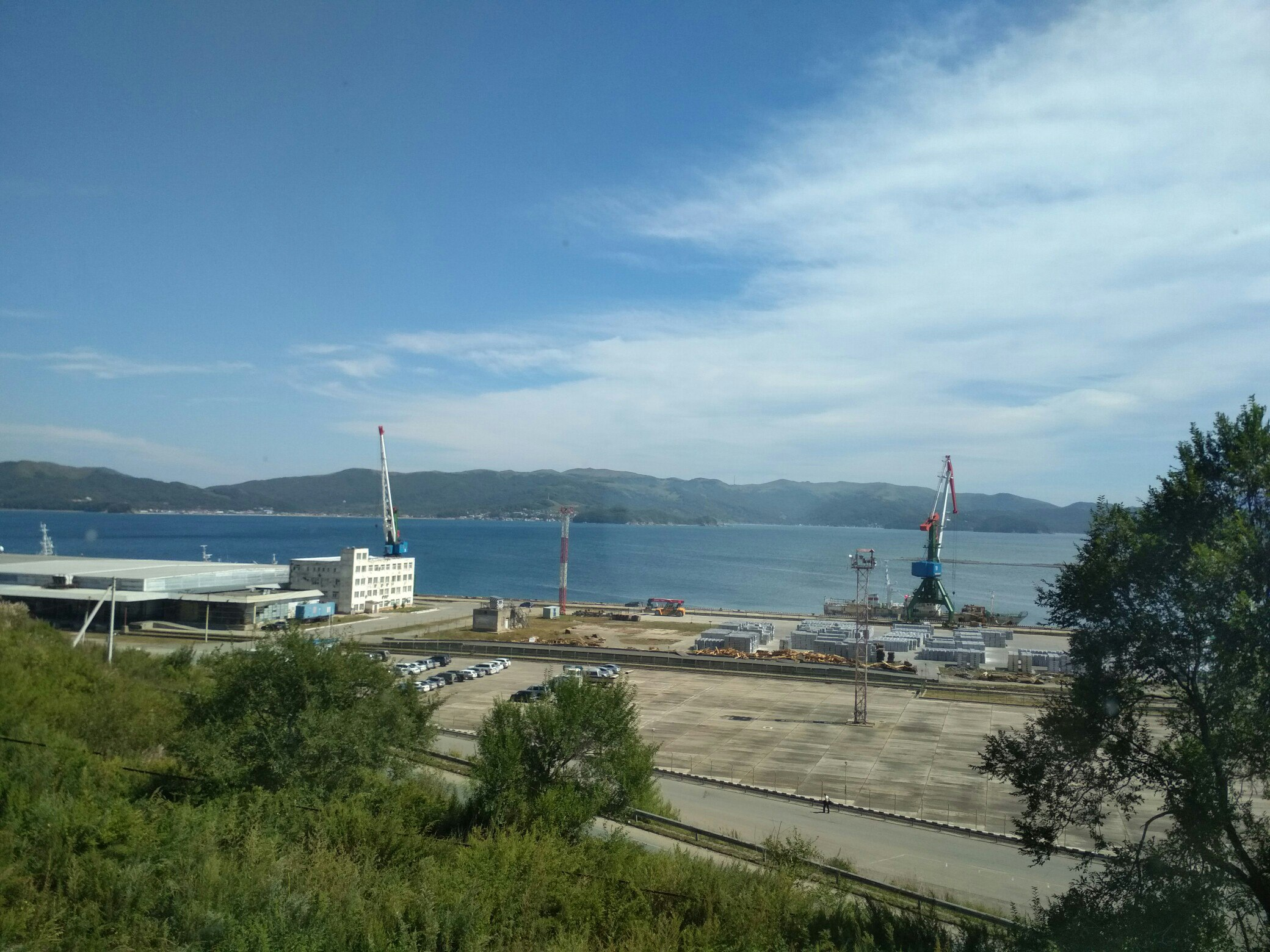
- View of the port
- Interactive map of Port of Zarubino
- Native name: Морской порт Зару́бино (Russian)

Location
- Country: Russia
- Location: Zarubino, Primorsky Krai
- Coordinates: 42°38′29″N 131°4′55″E
- UN/LOCODE: RUZAR

Details
- Opened: 1972
- Type of Harbor: Sea
- Size: Medium

Statistics
- Website; The Port of Zarubino

Port of Zarubino (Russian: порт Зару́бино) is a sea port situated in Zarubino on the south of Primorsky Krai in the Trinity Bay, northwestern part of the Sea of Japan. The port is 18 kilometres (11 mi) from the border with China and close to the border with North Korea. A railway line from the port connects to railway lines running north to Vladivostok, west to Hunchun of Jilin Province in China where a high speed rail terminus is operational, and south to Rajin in North Korea via Khasan, respectively. It is ice-free year round.

== History ==
Port of Zarubino originated from the construction of a fishing industry sea port which began in 1972.

In June 1973, the Order of " Primorrybproma " from 06.01.1973 Direction was formed under construction fishing port "Trinity". In July 1981, the Order of the All-Union Association of the Far Eastern fishery basin ( VRPO " Dalryba ") dated 01.06.1981 in the village formed the Zarubino enterprise Sea Fishing Port Trinity.

In December 1988, in accordance with the order of the USSR Ministry of Fisheries from 01.12.1988 №450 Enterprise "Sea Fishing Port " Trinity " " was renamed "Khasan fishing port".

In April 1992, the Order of the Government of Russia from 15.04.1992 № 739- p Khasan sea commercial port Trinity Bay was opened to foreign vessels.

A railway line from the port connects to the railway line from Vladivostok to Khasan on the border with North Korea and the line to Jilin Province in China.

In May 2013 Order of the Russian Ministry of Health of 12.11.2012 № 904n cancelled orders from the Health Ministry of Russia 7.03.2012 № 207n that point through the state border of the Russian Federation in the seaport Zarubino was included in the list of checkpoints across the state border of the Russian Federation, especially equipped and intended for import of goods, chemical, biological and radioactive substances, waste and other goods that are hazardous to human food products, materials and articles in contact with food.

=== Development ===
There are prospects of development of the Zarubino seaport through either the construction of new or expansion of existing port infrastructure. In February 2014 plans were announced for construction of a grain terminal with capacity of 5 million tons in a joint venture of United Grain Company with Dalport, an affiliate of multi-industry holding Summa Group of Russia. It is planned to bring the total volume of cargo handling in the seaport to 10 million tons and to supply grain to the Asia-Pacific region, including by increasing the processing of rolling cargo (cars and other equipment), fish and containers not only Russian export-import, but also for the purposes of transit, from north to south China and from China to Korea.

In May 2014, Jilin province of China and the Summa Group signed a cooperative agreement about development of the port at the fourth Conference on Interaction and Confidence-Building Measures in Asia (CICA), held in Shanghai. The scheme would expand port capacity to 60 million tonnes of cargo per year. The first phase is due to be completed by 2018 allowing for 500,000 twenty foot equivalent units containers and 10 million tonnes of grain and cargo per year.
