= Battle of Lake Khasan =

1938 Soviet-Japanese border clashes

Coordinates: 42°26′09.26″N 130°36′39.62″E

- Part of the Soviet–Japanese border conflicts
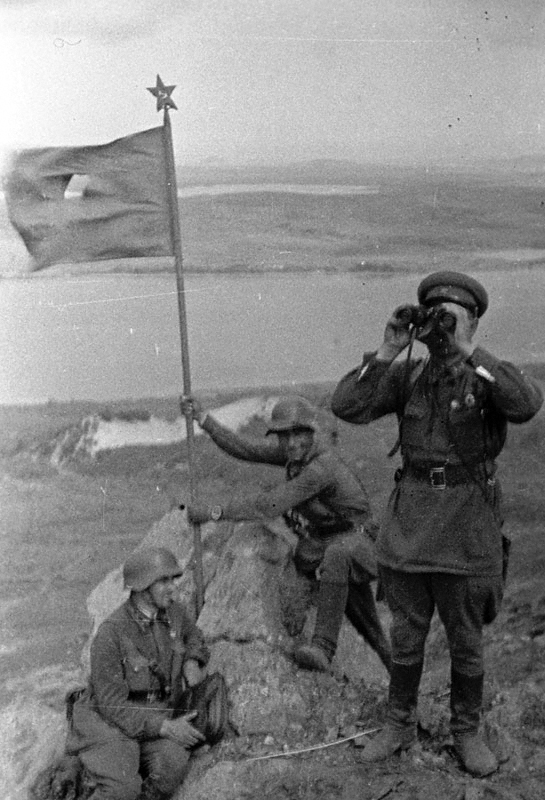
- Lieutenant I. N. Moshlyak and two Soviet soldiers on Zaozernaya Hill after the battle
Date	29 July – 11 August 1938 (1 week and 6 days)
Location	Lake Khasan, Russian SFSR, Soviet Union (near Fangchuan, Manchukuo and Rason, Korea, Empire of Japan)
Result	Ceasefire
Territorial changes	Japan agrees to withdraw its forces from the disputed territory; Soviet-Japanese border set at the Tumen River.

Belligerents
Soviet Union	Japan: Manchukuo

Commanders and leaders
Vasily Blyukher; Nikolai Berzarin; Grigory Shtern	Kamezō Suetaka; Kōtoku Satō

Units involved
Soviet Border Troops: 59th Khasanskiy Detachment	Unknown

Strength
22,950; 354 tanks 13 self-propelled guns 237 artillery pieces 70 fighters 180 bombers	7,000–7,300; 37 artillery pieces

Casualties and losses
792 killed & missing 3,279 wounded or sick 46+ tanks destroyed (Soviet sources); 96 tanks destroyed or crippled (Japanese sources)	526 killed 913 wounded(Japanese sources); 3,000 killed & missing(Soviet claim)

The Battle of Lake Khasan (Russian: Хасанские бои), also known as the Changkufeng Incident (Chinese and Japanese: 張鼓峰事件; Chinese pinyin: Zhānggǔfēng Shìjiàn; Japanese romaji: Chōkohō Jiken), was an attempted military incursion by Manchukuo, a Japanese puppet state, into territory claimed and controlled by the Soviet Union. The incursion, which occurred from 29 July to 11 August 1938, was founded in the Japanese belief that the Soviet Union had misinterpreted the demarcation of the boundary based on the Treaty of Peking between Imperial Russia and Qing China, and had subsequently tampered with the demarcation markers. Japanese forces occupied the disputed area but withdrew after heavy fighting and a diplomatic settlement.

== Background ==
For most of the first half of the twentieth century, there was considerable tension between the Russian (later Soviet), Chinese, and Japanese governments, along their common borders in what became North East China. The Chinese Eastern Railway (CER) was a railway in northeastern China (Manchuria). It connected China and the Russian Far East. The southern branch of the CER, known in the West as the South Manchuria Railway, became the locus and partial casus belli for the Russo-Japanese War and subsequent incidents, leading to the Second Sino-Japanese War and Soviet–Japanese border conflicts. Larger incidents included the Sino-Soviet conflict of 1929 and the Mukden incident between Japan and China in 1931. The Battle of Lake Khasan was fought between two powers which had long mistrusted each other.

In the period before the battle, a series of purges left the Soviet army with many positions filled by inexperienced officers who feared to take the initiative. In July 1938 alone, four and a half times as many people were purged from the Far Eastern Front (the Soviet command in the region) as in the previous twelve months. This in combination with lack of infrastructure, the overburdening of the front's commander, Marshal Vasily Blyukher (or Blücher), shortage of equipment, and poor organization led to the Front being in poor shape.

The confrontation was triggered in July 1938, when Far Eastern Front and Soviet State Security (NKVD) Border Guard troops reinforced the Khasan border with Manchuria. This was prompted in part by the defection one month before (13 June) of Soviet General G. S. Lyushkov, in charge of all NKVD forces in the Soviet Far East at Hunchun, in the Tumen River area. He provided the Japanese with intelligence on the poor state of Soviet Far Eastern forces and the purge of army officers.

== Build-up ==
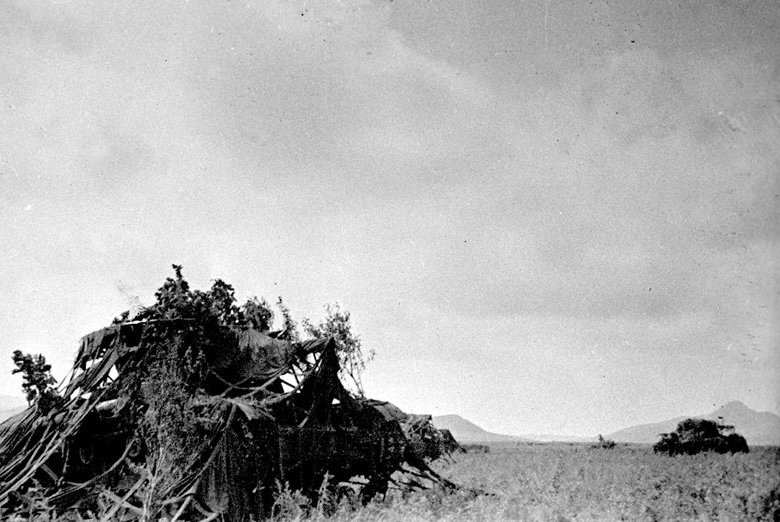
Camouflaged Soviet tanks

On 6 July 1938, the Japanese Kwantung Army decoded a message sent by the Soviet commander in the Posyet region to Soviet headquarters in Khabarovsk. The message recommended that Soviet soldiers be allowed to secure unoccupied high ground west of Lake Khasan, most notably the disputed Changkufeng Heights, because it would be advantageous for the Soviets to occupy terrain which overlooked the Korean port-city of Rajin, as well as strategic railways linking Korea to Manchuria. In the next two weeks, small groups of Soviet border troops moved into the area and began fortifying the mountain with emplacements, observation trenches, entanglements and communication facilities.

On 7 July, from Posyet where the headquarters of the 59th border detachment was located, a request was made to allow the capture of the height, which was actually already occupied: the first deputy People's Commissar of Internal Affairs of the USSR, Mikhail Frinovsky, needed to file a document coming from his subordinates to the superior command. According to commander Grigory Shtern, chief of staff of the Far Eastern Front, on 8 July, "by decision of the commander of the 59th border guard detachment, the height was occupied and one heavy machine gun was set up." There can be no question of any initiative by the head of the border detachment: the order was personally given by Frinovsky but this was done orally. In writing, everything was formalized as a request from Colonel Kuzma Grebennik, commander of the 59th Border Detachment, who wrote that "The Japanese are preparing to capture the height with a horizontal mark of 100, they are laying a telephone line, they have reached the western slopes of this height ... They can preempt the capture". Colonel Fedotov's order from the Far Eastern Border Forces headquarters immediately followed: to guard the height with a permanent outfit. And already by order of the head of the Posietsky border detachment, the Zaozernaya Hill was first captured by a permanent detachment (10 people), and then a reserve outpost approached with another 30 fighters. On the night of 8–9 July 1938, the Soviet border guards, following the order of the command, began to install barbed wire and dig trenches.

On 10 July 1938, the deputy head of the Posyetsky border detachment, Major Alexander Alekseev, reported to the military headquarters in Khabarovsk that the height is engaged in a reserve outpost, in addition to the outposts Podgornaya and Pakshekori. The conflict started on 15 July, when the Japanese attaché in Moscow demanded the removal of Soviet border troops from the Bezymyannaya (сопка Безымянная, Chinese name: Shācǎofēng = 沙草峰) and Zaozyornaya (сопка Заозёрная, Chinese name: Zhāng Gǔfēng = 张鼓峰 (Changkufeng)) Hills to the west of Lake Khasan in the south of Primorye not far from Vladivostok, claiming this territory by the Soviet–Korea border. The Soviets were performing trench works and built rock heaps and laid several land mines on slopes of the hill, not only on the Soviet slope of the hill, but also on Manchurian territory. The Japanese embassy protested, demanding that the status quo will be restored, but the Soviet government denied those accusations.

On 15 July, Colonel Grebennik reported that the readiness of trench work was 80%; barriers were 50%; and that three cell trenches had been opened in full profiles, each for one compartment. Meanwhile, Frinovsky's special group reached the headquarters of the 59th Posyet border detachment, from where they moved to the Zaozernaya hill. The formal pretext for an official of such a high rank (the second person in the NKVD) to go to the very border line was the same "investigation" of Lyushkov's escape. To accompany this retinue, Lieutenant Vinevitin was assigned as a sniper.

At first, the Japanese Korean Army, which had been assigned to defend the area, disregarded the Soviet advance. However, the Kwantung Army, whose administrative jurisdiction overlapped Zhāng Gǔfēng (Changkufeng), pushed the Korean Army to take more action, because it was suspicious of Soviet intentions. Following this, the Korean Army took the matter to Tokyo, recommending that a formal protest be sent to the Soviet Union.

Frinovsky's retinue, which included Lieutenant Vasily Vinevitin, appeared on Zaozernaya Hill on 15 July. Then, as follows from the documents, something completely unexpected happened: on Frinovsky's orders, several people from his retinue crossed the border line and, entering Manchurian territory, demonstratively began to pretend to be carrying out engineering and earthworks there. The "Japanese-Manchus" noticed this and sent a small group to the site of the violation. Before reaching the border, the gendarmes politely asked the Soviets to stop its perceived illegal work on Manchurian territory. Lieutenant Vinevitin, with a well-aimed rifle shot to the head, killed the persistent Japanese on the spot – on the personal order of Frinovsky.

== Battle ==
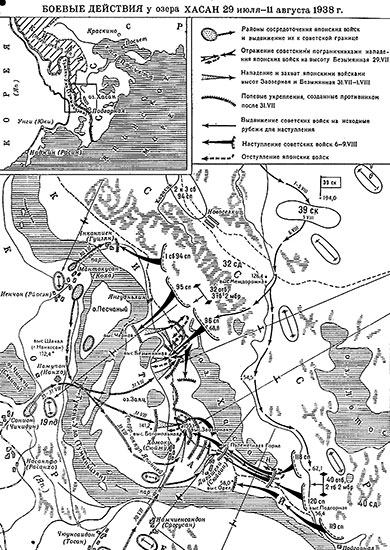
Schematic map. The defeat of the Japanese troops at Lake Hassan. 29 July – 11 August 1938

The Japanese 19th Division along with some Manchukuo units took on the Soviet 39th Rifle Corps under Grigory Shtern (eventually consisting of the 32nd, 39th and 40th Rifle Divisions, the 2nd Mechanised Brigade and two tank battalions). One of the Japanese Army Commanders at the battle was Colonel Kotoku Sato, the commander of the 75th Infantry Regiment. Lieutenant General Suetaka Kamezo gave Sato an order: "You are to mete out a firm and thorough counterattack without fail, once you gather that the enemy is advancing even in the slightest". The hidden meaning of this was that Sato had been ordered to expel the Soviets from Changkufeng.

On 31 July, Sato's regiment launched a night sortie on the fortified hill. In the Changkufeng sector, 1,114 Japanese engaged a Soviet garrison of 300, eliminating them and knocking out 10 tanks, with casualties of 34 killed and 99 wounded. In the Shachofeng sector, 379 Japanese surprised and routed another 300 Soviet troops, while knocking out seven tanks, for 11 killed and 34 wounded. Thousands more Japanese soldiers from the 19th Division arrived, dug in, and requested reinforcements. High Command rejected the request, as they knew General Suetaka would use these forces to assault vulnerable Soviet positions, escalating the incident. Japanese troops defended the disputed area. In 1933, the Japanese had designed and built a "Rinji Soko Ressha" (Special Armoured Train). The train was deployed as the "2nd Armoured Train Unit" in Manchuria and participated in the Second Sino-Japanese War and the Changkufeng conflict against the Soviets, transporting thousands of Japanese troops to and from the battlefield, and demonstrating to the West the capability of an Asian nation to implement Western ideas and doctrine concerning rapid infantry deployment and transport.

On 31 July, People's Commissar for Defence Kliment Voroshilov ordered combat readiness for 1st Coastal Army and the Pacific Fleet. The Soviets gathered 354 tanks and assault guns at Lake Khasan, including 257 T-26 tanks (with 10 KhT-26 flame-throwing tanks), three ST-26 bridge-laying tanks, 81 BT-7 light tanks and 13 SU-5-2 self-propelled guns. The chief of the Far East Front, Vasily Blücher, arrived at the front line on 2 August 1938. Under his command, additional forces were moved up and from 2–9 August, the Japanese forces at Changkufeng were attacked. Such was the disparity of forces that one Japanese artillery commander observed that the Soviets fired more shells in one day than the Japanese did in the two-week affair. Despite this, the Japanese defenders organized an anti-tank defense, with disastrous results for the poorly coordinated Soviets, whose attacks were defeated with many casualties. Thousands of Soviet troops were killed or wounded and at least 46 (or 45 unoperational because of gun fire and getting stuck in the marshes or damaged or 80 of which 24 completely destroyed) tanks were knocked out, with another 39 damaged to varying degrees.

After the Japanese pushed the Soviet border security unit, later reinforced by the 40th Rifle Division, from the hill and other positions the Japanese dug in while the Soviets reinforced their troops. Unlike the Japanese the Soviets didn't have a railway close to the battlefield, but instead a single unpaved road so when Soviet reinforcements got to the battlefield the Japanese were already well entrenched. The Soviets had attacked Japanese positions by air during the preparations for a ground attack. On the morning before the Soviet attack, 13 Soviet aircraft attacked the hill and 12 the rear of the Japanese forces, even though this isn't documented by all sources. This was followed by an attack of three Soviet infantry regiments, but this attack didn't have artillery or air support, either because of poor preparations or in the case of air support possibly fog. Some sources, however, do claim that two artillery batteries supported the attack. The attack was supported by a tank regiment but regardless it soon stalled. This was largely due to the low preparedness of the Soviet troops. Some of the artillery was not ready, little was known of the Japanese dispositions, communications had not fully been set up and the left wing was not ready to start the attack at the appointed time. Despite the poor state of the Soviet force and the knowledge that the enemy was well entrenched the attack was ordered to go ahead. The tank crews had not been prepared for the hostile terrain so they weren't able to keep up the momentum. During the attack a number of commanders including the commander of the 40th rifle division's tank battalion abandoned their troops.

The Soviets renewed their attack on 6 August. First multiple waves of bombers attacked the Japanese positions. This attack was delayed either because of fog or poor preparations. After the bombers an assault by tanks and infantry, including mechanized troops, supported by artillery was made. In the difficult terrain the tanks suffered heavy losses, only individual tanks made it to their objectives, all of which were destroyed or retreated later. During the attack an outflanking movement was made. The Soviets pushed back the Japanese after heavy fighting, the subsequent days the Japanese counterattacked but were unable to recapture their positions.

The Japanese were pushed back by the Soviet attacks but were still on the battlefield. Despite this, it was clear that the local Japanese units would not be able to keep Changkufeng without widening the conflict. On 10 August, Japanese ambassador Mamoru Shigemitsu asked for peace. Satisfied that the incident had been brought to an "honourable" conclusion, on 11 August 1938, at 13:30 local time the Japanese stopped fighting and Soviet forces reoccupied the heights.

== Consequences ==
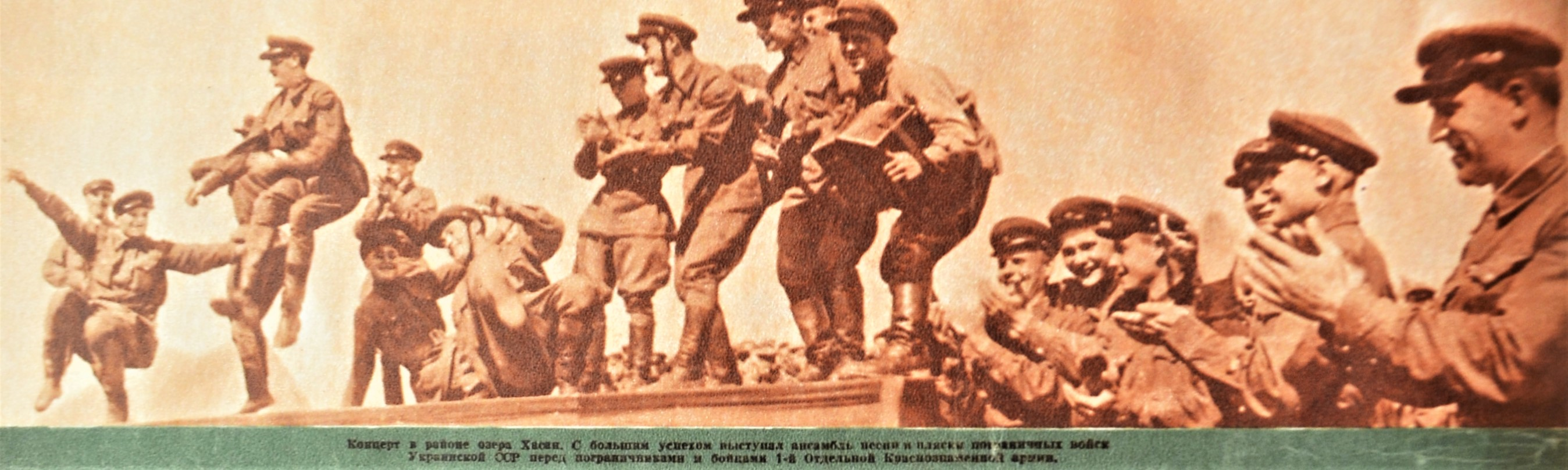
Red Army soldiers celebrate after the Battle of Lake Khasan.

More than 6,500 Soviet officers and soldiers were awarded orders, decorations, and medals of the Soviet Union; 26 of them were awarded the title Hero of the Soviet Union, and 95 were awarded the Order of Lenin.

Soviet losses totaled 792 killed or missing and 3,279 wounded or sick, according to their records and the Japanese claimed to have destroyed or immobilized 96 enemy tanks and 30 guns. Soviet armoured losses were significant, with dozens of tanks being knocked out or destroyed and hundreds of "tank troops" becoming casualties. Japanese casualties, as revealed by secret Army General Staff statistics, were 1,439 casualties (526 killed or missing, 913 wounded); the Soviets claimed Japanese losses of 3,100, with 600 killed and 2,500 wounded. The Soviets concluded that this was because of poor communications infrastructure and roads as well as the loss of unit coherence due to poor organization, headquarters and commanders and a lack of combat supply units. The faults in the Soviet army and leadership at Khasan were blamed on the incompetence of Blyukher. In addition to leading the troops into action at Khasan, Blyukher was also supposed to oversee the trans-Baikal military district's and the far eastern fronts move to combat readiness using an administrative apparatus that delivered army group, army and corps level instructions to the 40th Rifle Division by accident. On 22 October, he was arrested by the NKVD and is thought to have been tortured to death.

The Japanese military, while seriously analyzing the results of the battle, engaged with the Soviets once more, with disastrous results, in the more extensive Battles of Khalkhin Gol (Nomonhan) in 1939. This second engagement resulted in the defeat of the Japanese Sixth Army. After World War II, at the International Military Tribunal for the Far East in 1946, 13 high-ranking Japanese officials were charged with crimes against peace for their roles in initiating hostilities at Lake Khasan.

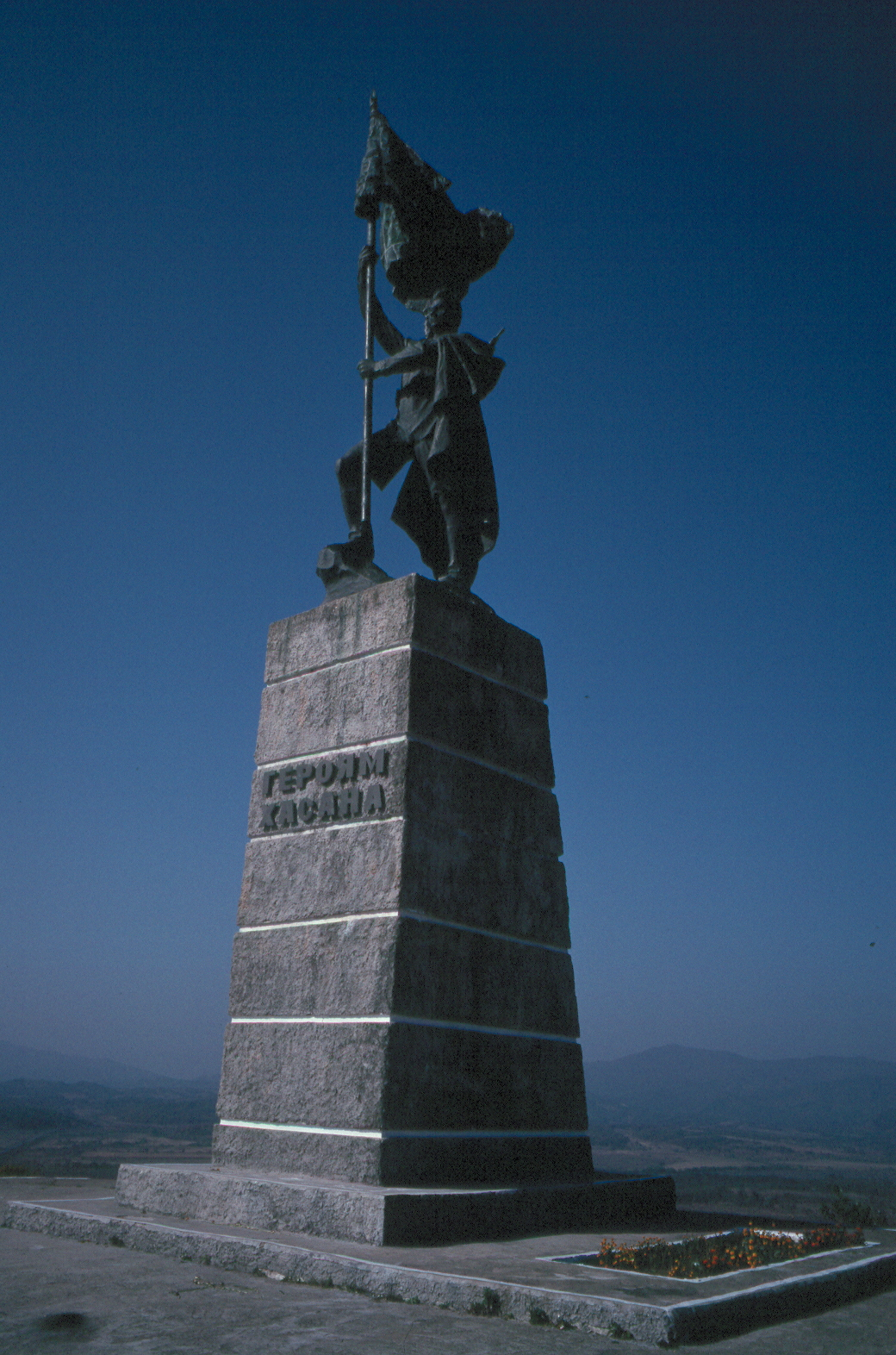
War memorial outside Kraskino, on the bluffs where the Battle of Lake Khasan took place

== See also ==
- Ivan Pozharsky, posthumously awarded Hero of the Soviet Union for his participation in the battle.
