= Soviet destroyer Tbilisi =

Leningrad-class destroyer

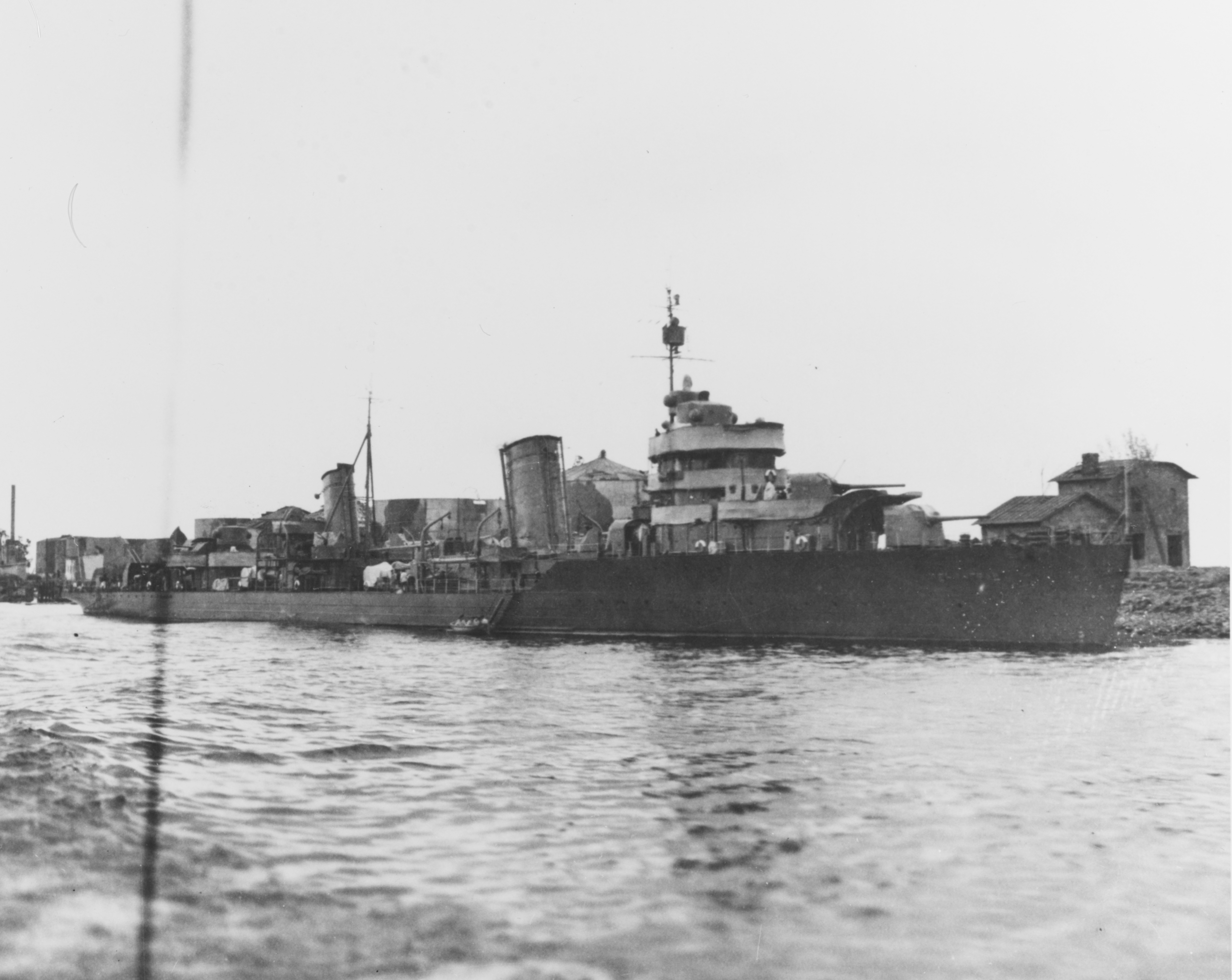
- Unknown Leningrad-class destroyer in Leningrad, June 1944

History

Soviet Union
- Name: Tbilisi
- Namesake: Tbilisi
- Ordered: 2nd Five-Year Plan
- Builder: Shipyard No. 199, Komsomolsk-on-Amur
- Laid down: 15 January 1935 as Tiflis
- Launched: 24 July 1939
- Commissioned: 11 December 1940
- Renamed: Tbilisi, 24 July 1939
- Reclassified: As target ship, 18 April 1958
- Stricken: 31 January 1964
- Fate: Scrapped, 1964

General characteristics (as built)
- Class & type: Leningrad-class destroyer leader
- Displacement: 2,350 long tons (2,390 t) (standard)
- Length: 127.5 m (418 ft 4 in) (o/a)
- Beam: 11.7 m (38 ft 5 in)
- Draft: 4.06 m (13 ft 4 in)
- Installed power: 3 three-drum boilers; 66,000 shp (49,000 kW)
- Propulsion: 3 shafts; 3 geared steam turbines
- Speed: 40 knots (74 km/h; 46 mph)
- Range: 2,100 nmi (3,900 km; 2,400 mi) at 20 knots (37 km/h; 23 mph)
- Complement: 250 (311 wartime)
- Sensors & processing systems: Arktur hydrophones
- Armament: 5 × single 130 mm (5.1 in) guns; 3 × single 76.2 mm (3 in) AA guns; 2 × single 45 mm (1.8 in) AA guns; 2 × quadruple 533 mm (21 in) torpedo tubes; 68–115 mines; 52 depth charges

Tbilisi (Russian: Тбилиси) was one of six Leningrad-class destroyer leaders built for the Soviet Navy during the 1930s, one of the three Project 38 variants. Completed in 1940, the ship was assigned to the Pacific Fleet, with which she spent World War II. Tbilisi laid minefields outside Vladivostok early in the war and during the Soviet–Japanese War transported naval infantry in preparation for an amphibious landing in Korea. Postwar, she continued to serve with the Pacific Fleet and began a lengthy overhaul in 1951 that lasted until 1955. Converted into a target ship in 1958, she was finally struck from the Navy List in 1964 and scrapped.

== Design and description ==
Impressed by the French large destroyer (contre-torpilleur) designs such as the Vauquelin class of the early 1930s, the Soviets designed their own version. The Leningrads had an overall length of 127.5 meters (418 ft 4 in) and were 122 meters (400 ft 3 in) long at the waterline. The ships had a beam of 11.7 meters (38 ft 5 in), and a draft of 4.06 meters (13 ft 4 in) at deep load. Built in two batches, the second batch (Project 38) displaced 2,350 long tons (2,390 t) at standard load and 2,680 long tons (2,720 t) at deep load. Their crew numbered 250 officers and sailors in peacetime and 311 in wartime. The ships had three geared steam turbines, each driving one propeller, designed to produce 66,000 shaft horsepower (49,000 kW) using steam from three three-drum boilers which was intended to give them a maximum speed of 40 knots (74 km/h; 46 mph). The Leningrads carried enough fuel oil to give them a range of 2,100 nautical miles (3,900 km; 2,400 mi) at 20 knots (37 km/h; 23 mph).

As built, the Leningrad-class ships mounted five 130-millimeter (5.1 in) B-13 guns in two pairs of superfiring single mounts fore and aft of the superstructure and another mount between the bridge and the forward funnel. The guns were protected by gun shields. Anti-aircraft defense was provided by three 76.2-millimeter (3 in) 34-K AA guns in single mounts on the aft superstructure and a pair of 45-millimeter (1.8 in) 21-K AA guns mounted on either side of the bridge as well as six 12.7-millimeter (0.50 in) DShK machine guns. They carried eight 533 mm (21.0 in) torpedo tubes in two rotating quadruple mounts; each tube was provided with a reload. The ships could also carry a maximum of either 68 or 115 mines and 52 depth charges. They were fitted with a set of Arktur hydrophones for anti-submarine detection.

=== Modifications ===
During the war, Tbilisi exchanged her two 21-K mounts for eight 37-millimeter (1.5 in) 70-K AA guns. She received a British Type 128 asdic system and was fitted with a Type 291 early-warning radar, a Type 284 gunnery radar and an American SF-1 radar. After the war, all of the 76- and 37-millimeter guns were replaced by a dozen water-cooled V-11M versions of the 70-K gun in twin mounts. During the 1950s, the radars were replaced by Top Bow, EWS Top, Plum Jar and Ball End radars and the pole foremast was replaced by a tripod mast to support them.

== Construction and career ==
Named after the capital of Georgia, major components for the ship that became Tbilisi were laid down at Shipyard No. 198 (Marti South) in Nikolayev on 15 January 1935 as yard number 268 and were then railed to Shipyard No. 199 in Komsomolsk-on-Amur where the ship was laid down again on 10 August 1936. Originally named Tiflis, she was renamed Tbilisi on the day of her launching, 24 July 1939. To free up space for new construction, the destroyer leader was moved to Lake Silinskoye near the plant for completion. Tbilisi was commissioned on 11 December 1940 as part of the Pacific Fleet after a series of tests; she had cost 41.2 million rubles due to her lengthy construction.

Due to the numerical inferiority of the Pacific Fleet to the Imperial Japanese Navy, the Soviet ships were tasked with coast defense. Used as a testbed for new technologies from the beginning of the war, she laid the first mines in Peter the Great Gulf off Vladivostok on 12 July and then began laying mines off other naval bases in the Far East. By late 1941, Tbilisi was equipped with a degaussing system, and was used to train officers in ship handling due to the peaceful conditions in the Far East. When the Light Forces Detachment of the Pacific Fleet was formed in November 1942, she became the leader of the 2nd Destroyer Division. In July and August 1943, she had degaussing coils placed on the upper deck to examine the effect of the steel hull on the coils; these studies helped to develop methods for the optimal placement of coils on ships.

A day before the Soviet Union declared war on Japan on 9 August 1945, the flotilla leader, transferred to the 1st Destroyer Division of the Light Forces Detachment, entered the active fleet. On 9 August, she was located in the Ulysses (Uliss) Bay off Vladivostok, and was ordered to move to the northerly anchorage of Zolotoy Rog off the same port. Under the flag of fleet commander Admiral Ivan Yumashev, she transported a hundred-man company of naval infantry from the 354th Naval Rifle Battalion to Vityaz Cove in Posyet Bay on 12 August. From there, the company was loaded onto torpedo boats for an amphibious landing at the Korean port of Rason. This was her only major operation during the war, but did not involve contact with the Japanese. Yumashev slated Tbilisi to serve as flagship for a projected invasion of Hokkaido in an order of 19 August, but the operation was cancelled.

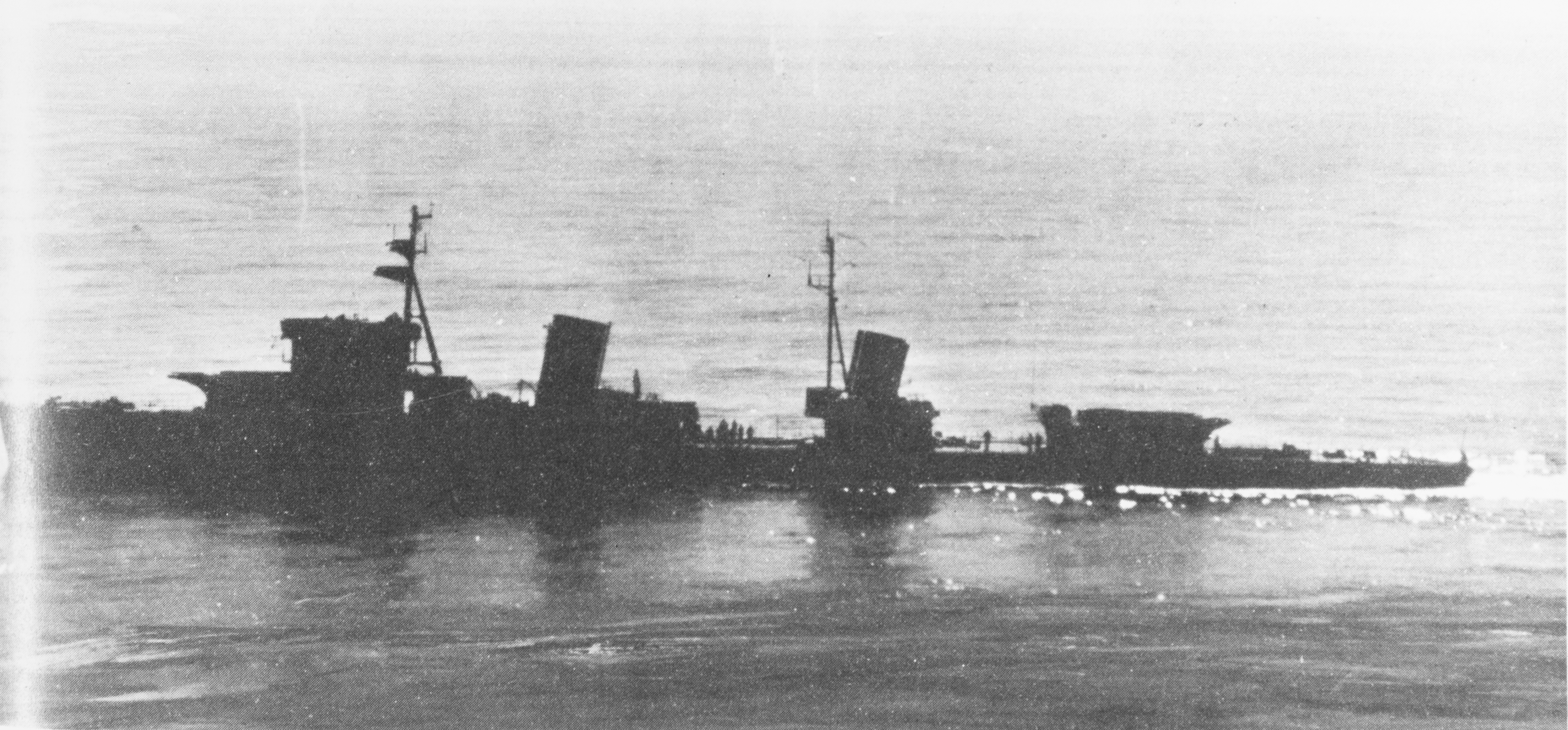
Tbilisi while converted into a target ship, photographed in the Pacific in 1958

She continued to serve with the Pacific Fleet postwar and on 12 January 1949 was reclassified as a destroyer like her surviving sister ships. Between 1951 and 24 January 1955 she underwent a major refit and modernization at Dalzavod. Tbilisi was withdrawn from active service on 18 April 1958, disarmed, and converted into the target ship TsL-50. A year later, the ship was renamed TSP-50, before being struck on 31 January 1964 and scrapped at Vladivostok by the Main Directorate for the Procurement, Processing and Sale of Secondary Ferrous Metals.

== Bibliography ==
- Breyer, Siegfried (1992). Soviet Warship Development: Volume 1: 1917–1937. London: Conway Maritime Press. ISBN 0-85177-604-3.
- Budzbon, Przemysław (1980). "Soviet Union". In Chesneau, Roger (ed.). Conway's All the World's Fighting Ships 1922–1946. Greenwich, UK: Conway Maritime Press. pp. 318–346. ISBN 0-85177-146-7.
- Budzbon, Przemysław; Radziemski, Jan & Twardowski, Marek (2022). Warships of the Soviet Fleets 1939–1945. Vol. I: Major Combatants. Annapolis, Maryland: Naval Institute Press. ISBN 978-1-68247-877-6.
- Glantz, David M. (2003). The Soviet Strategic Offensive in Manchuria, 1945: August Storm. London: Frank Cass. ISBN 0-7146-5279-2.
- Hill, Alexander (2018). Soviet Destroyers of World War II. New Vanguard. Vol. 256. Oxford, UK: Osprey Publishing. ISBN 978-1-4728-2256-7.
- Kachur, Pavel (2008). "Гончие псы" Красного флота. "Ташкент", "Баку", "Ленинград" [Hounds of the Red Fleet: Tashkent, Baku, Leningrad] (in Russian). Moscow: Yauza/Eksmo. ISBN 978-5-699-31614-4.
- Rohwer, Jürgen (2005). Chronology of the War at Sea 1939–1945: The Naval History of World War Two (Third Revised ed.). Annapolis, Maryland: Naval Institute Press. ISBN 1-59114-119-2.
- Rohwer, Jürgen & Monakov, Mikhail S. (2001). Stalin's Ocean-Going Fleet. London: Frank Cass. ISBN 0-7146-4895-7.
