= Henan Subdistrict, Hunchun =

Henan Subdistrict 河南街道
- Subdistrict
- Location in Jilin
- Coordinates: 42.8561°N 130.3617°E
- Country: People's Republic of China
- Province: Jilin
- Autonomous Prefecture: Yanbian Korean Autonomous Prefecture
- County-level city: Hunchun
- Time zone: UTC+8 (China Standard)

Henan Subdistrict (Chinese: 河南街道; pinyin: Hénán Jiēdào) is a subdistrict in Hunchun, Jilin province, China. As of 2018, it has 6 communities under its administration.

== See also ==
- List of township-level divisions of Jilin
