= Hunchun =

Hunchun 珲春市 · 훈춘시
- County-level city
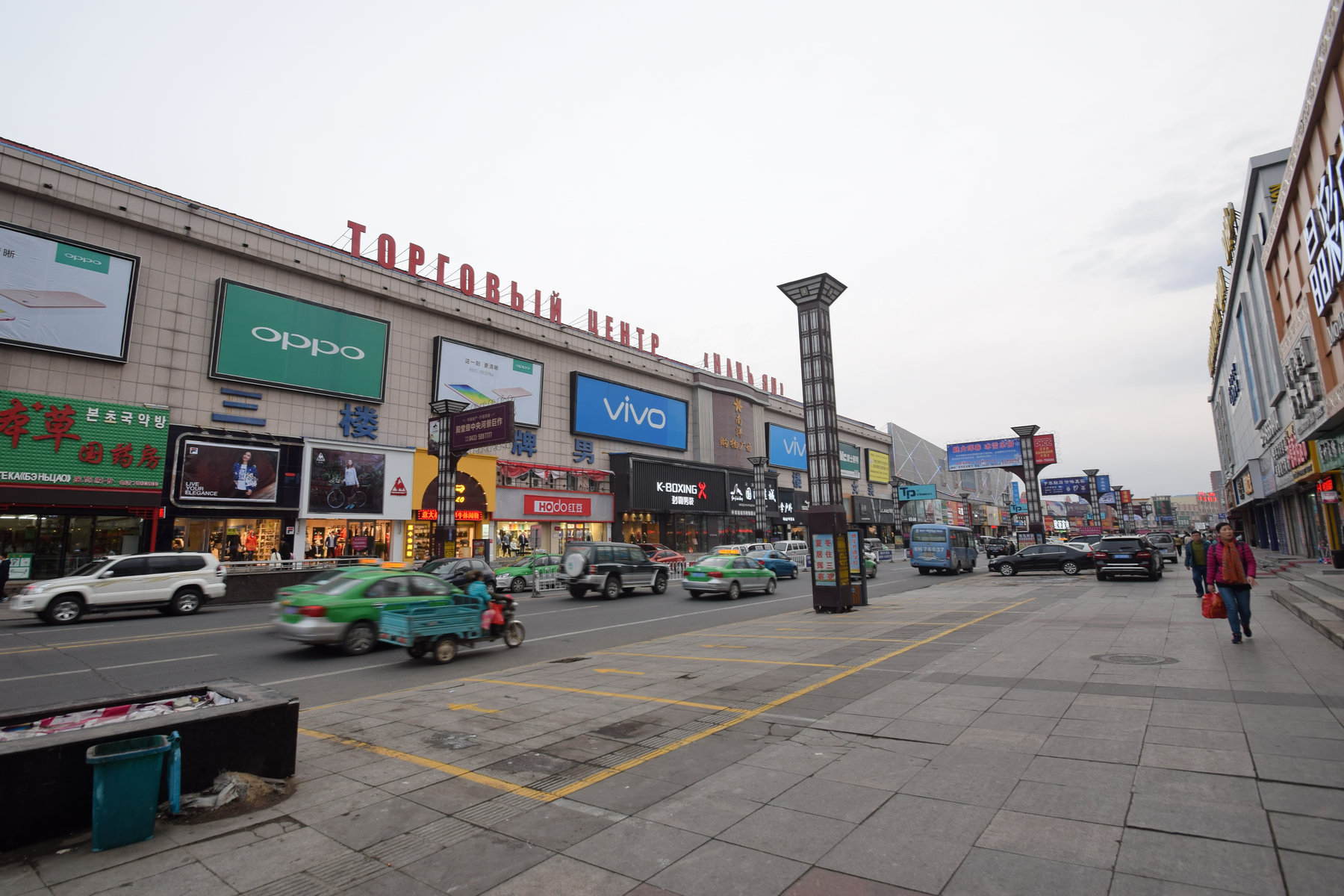
- A street in Hunchun, with signage in Chinese, Korean, and Russian

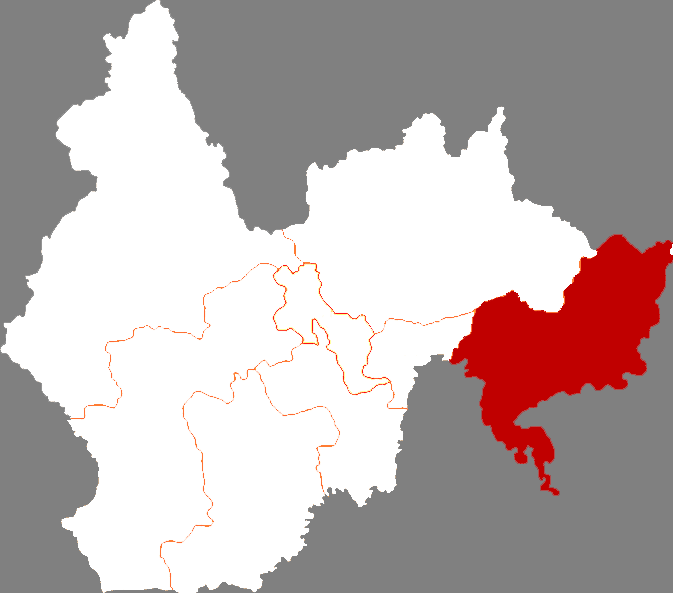
- Hunchun in Yanbian

- Location of the city center in Jilin
- Coordinates: 42°51′47″N 130°21′58″E
- Country: People's Republic of China
- Province: Jilin
- Prefecture: Yanbian
- Seat: Xin'an Subdistrict

Area
  - County-level city: 5,145.4 km^{2} (1,986.7 sq mi)
  - Urban: 125.39 km^{2} (48.41 sq mi)
- Elevation: 41 m (135 ft)

Population (2017)
  - County-level city: 271,000
  - Density: 52.7/km^{2} (136/sq mi)
  - Urban: 216,300
- Time zone: UTC+8 (China Standard)
- Postal code: 133300

Hunchun

Chinese name
- Simplified Chinese: 珲春市
- Traditional Chinese: 琿春市
Transcriptions
Standard Mandarin
- Hanyu Pinyin: Húnchūn Shì

Chinese Korean name
- Chosŏn'gŭl: 훈춘시
Transcriptions
- Revised Romanization: Hunchun-si
- McCune–Reischauer: Hunch'un-si

South Korean name
- Hangul: 혼춘시
Transcriptions
- Revised Romanization: Honchun-si
- McCune–Reischauer: Honch'un-si

Russian name
- Russian: Хуньчунь

Hunchun (Note: simplified Chinese: 珲春; traditional Chinese: 琿春; pinyin: Húnchūn; Korean: 훈춘; Russian: Хуньчунь) is a county-level city in the Yanbian Korean Autonomous Prefecture within Jilin province to the far east. It borders North Hamgyong Province in North Korea and Primorsky Krai in Russia, has over 250,000 inhabitants, and covers 5,145 square kilometers. The site of the eastern capital of the Balhae Kingdom between 785 and 793, Donggyeong, was located here.

The city's name Hunchun comes from Huncun in Manchu language (Manchu: ᡥᡠᠨᠴᡠᠨ, Möllendorff: huncun, Abkai: hunqun). The city and the village Fangchuan is located near the point of junction of the borders of China, Russia, and North Korea; provided with an observation platform, it is a popular tourist attraction.

== Administrative divisions ==
Hunchun has four subdistricts, four towns, and five townships.

Subdistricts:

- Xin'an Subdistrict (新安街道 / 신안가도)
- Jinghe Subdistrict (靖和街道 / 정화가도)
- Henan Subdistrict (河南街道 / 하남가도)
- Jinhai Subdistrict (近海街道 / 근해가도)

Towns:

- Chunhua (春化镇 / 춘화진)
- Jingxin (敬信镇 / 경신진)
- Banshi (板石镇 / 판석진)
- Ying'an (英安镇 / 영안진)

Townships:

- Hadamen Township (哈达门乡 / 합달문향)
- Machuanzi Township (马川子乡 / 마천자향)
- Mihong Township (密江乡 / 밀강향)
- Sanjiazi Manchu Ethnic Township (三家子满族乡 / 삼가자 만주족 향)
- Yangbaozi Manchu Ethnic Township (杨泡子满族乡 / 양포자 만주족 향)

== Climate ==
Climate data for Hunchun, elevation 43 m (141 ft), (1991–2020 normals, extremes 1981–present)
Month	Jan	Feb	Mar	Apr	May	Jun	Jul	Aug	Sep	Oct	Nov	Dec	Year
Record high °C (°F)	9.2 (48.6)	12.4 (54.3)	20.3 (68.5)	33.6 (92.5)	33.4 (92.1)	36.9 (98.4)	35.6 (96.1)	36.2 (97.2)	31.3 (88.3)	28.1 (82.6)	19.3 (66.7)	9.9 (49.8)	36.9 (98.4)
Mean daily maximum °C (°F)	−5.1 (22.8)	−0.5 (31.1)	6.2 (43.2)	14.6 (58.3)	19.7 (67.5)	22.8 (73.0)	25.8 (78.4)	26.8 (80.2)	23.1 (73.6)	15.8 (60.4)	4.8 (40.6)	−3.4 (25.9)	12.6 (54.6)
Daily mean °C (°F)	−10.5 (13.1)	−6.5 (20.3)	0.2 (32.4)	7.7 (45.9)	13.1 (55.6)	17.3 (63.1)	21.2 (70.2)	22.0 (71.6)	16.8 (62.2)	9.1 (48.4)	−0.6 (30.9)	−8.2 (17.2)	6.8 (44.2)
Mean daily minimum °C (°F)	−15.2 (4.6)	−12.1 (10.2)	−5.3 (22.5)	1.6 (34.9)	7.8 (46.0)	13.4 (56.1)	17.8 (64.0)	18.3 (64.9)	11.6 (52.9)	3.3 (37.9)	−5.1 (22.8)	−12.5 (9.5)	2.0 (35.5)
Record low °C (°F)	−27.7 (−17.9)	−27.9 (−18.2)	−24.1 (−11.4)	−7.3 (18.9)	−0.8 (30.6)	5.6 (42.1)	8.9 (48.0)	8.7 (47.7)	−1.7 (28.9)	−9.2 (15.4)	−21.2 (−6.2)	−23.4 (−10.1)	−27.9 (−18.2)
Average precipitation mm (inches)	8.9 (0.35)	8.4 (0.33)	14.2 (0.56)	31.5 (1.24)	76.4 (3.01)	83.6 (3.29)	136.5 (5.37)	122.9 (4.84)	76.3 (3.00)	37.3 (1.47)	21.8 (0.86)	8.8 (0.35)	626.6 (24.67)
Average precipitation days (≥ 0.1 mm)	2.3	3.1	4.8	7.0	13.4	14.4	15.1	14.2	9.5	6.1	5.3	3.7	98.9
Average snowy days	3.8	4.5	4.8	1.8	0	0	0	0	0	0.7	4.8	5.3	25.7
Average relative humidity (%)	53	52	54	58	69	80	84	81	75	64	59	56	65
Mean monthly sunshine hours	189.9	197.2	230.6	220.5	213.6	179.3	161.4	178.8	217.3	212.5	169.5	169.1	2,339.7
Percentage possible sunshine	65	66	62	55	47	39	35	42	59	63	59	61	54
Source: China Meteorological Administration All-time Oct extreme

== Economy ==
Since the early 1990s, the Chinese government invested significantly in transforming Hunchun into a regional economic center, thanks in large part to the influence of the former Jilin governor Wang Zhongyu, whose work with Zhu Rongji allowed him to become the first head of China's State Economic and Trade Commission. On 9 March 1992 the Chinese parliament approved to set up Hunchun Border Economic Cooperation Zone. The national government and Jilin provincial government have invested in succession over four billion yuan in Hunchun through the 1990s.

On 16 March 2013, a joint agreement to export textiles to North Korea was announced. The textiles would be made into up to 8,000 shirts in North Korea and exported back to China.

Hunchun Border Economic Cooperation Zone was approved to be national-level border economic cooperation zone in 1992, with a planning area of 24 km^{2} (9.3 sq mi). In 2002 and 2001, Hunchun Export Processing Zone and Hunchun Sino-Russia Trade Zone was set up in it. Being located in the junction of China, Russia, and Korea, it enjoys a strategic location. The city focuses on the development of sea food processing, electronic product manufacture, bio-pharmacy, textile industry and other industries.

Hunchun Export Processing Zone is located in 5 km^{2} (1.9 sq mi) area in Hunchun Border Economic Cooperation Zone. Its planned area is 2.44 km^{2} (0.94 sq mi). It enjoys good infrastructure and policies as its parent zone does.

== Transport ==
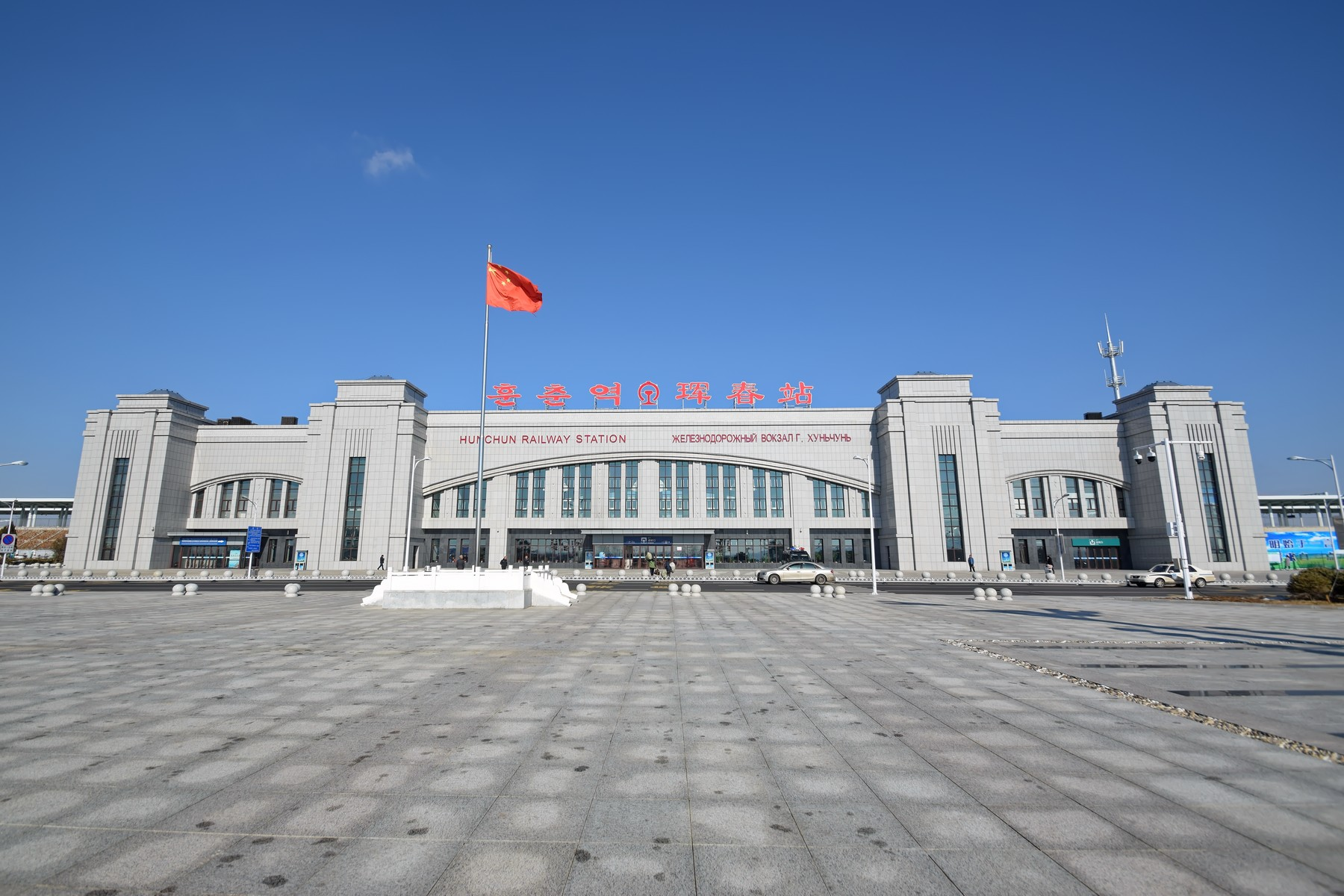
Hunchun Railway Station, with signage in Chinese, Korean, Russian, and English

In the early 1990s, Jilin province government constructed a railway and improved the highway to Hunchun. The Tumen River Bridge connects between Hunchun and the North Korean village of Wonjeong (원정) in Sonbong. The bridge was built during the Japanese occupation in 1938. In 2010 the bridge was renovated as part of an agreement between North Korea and China to modernize the Rason port in North Korea. Hunchun road is connected to Kraskino in Russia via Chenglingzi border crossing. In addition, a new railway line was constructed which links Hunchun and Makhalino (a station on the Baranovsky–Khasan line, 41 km (25 mi) before Khasan) in Russia and began operating in February 2000. Hunchun port is 42 km (26 mi) from Posyet and 63 km (39 mi) from Zarubino port towns of Russia.

The Jilin–Hunchun intercity railway, a 250-km/h high-speed passenger rail line from Jilin to Hunchun via Tumen (吉图珲铁路客运专线), began construction work in January 2011, and was scheduled and finished at the end of September 2015. The railway has been described as "Dongbei's most beautiful railway" (due to the terrain it runs through) and "the fastest way to Vladivostok" (4 hours by train from Shenyang to Hunchun, plus four hours by bus from Hunchun to Vladivostok). Reflecting the border location of the city, the train station has its sign in four languages: Chinese, Korean, Russian, and English.

== Sister cites ==
- Rason, North Korea
