= Zaozernaya Hill =

Geographical location

Coordinates: 42°26′47.6″N 130°35′44.8″E

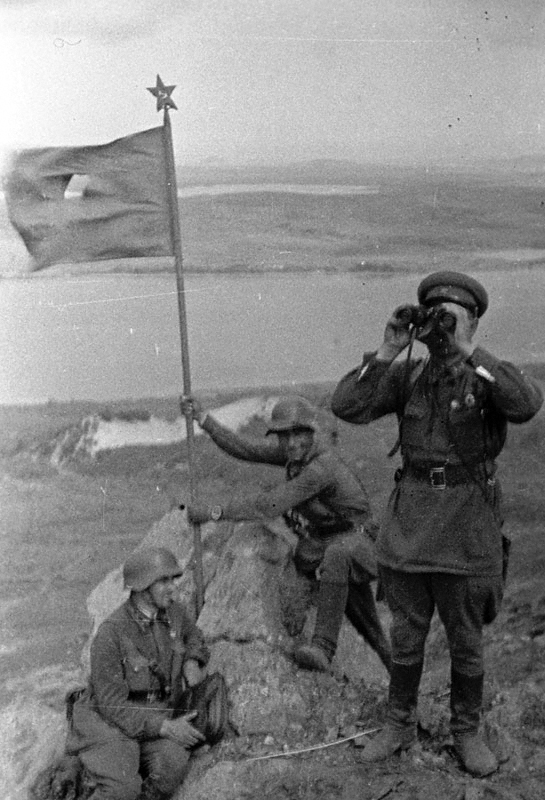
Lieutenant I.N. Moshlyak and two Soviet soldiers on Zaozyornaya Hill after the Battle of Lake Khasan

Zaozernaya Hill is a hill that is located near the border between China, North Korea, and Russia. It is located west of Lake Khasan.
