= Zarubino, Primorsky Krai =

Zarubino Зарубино
- Urban-type settlement
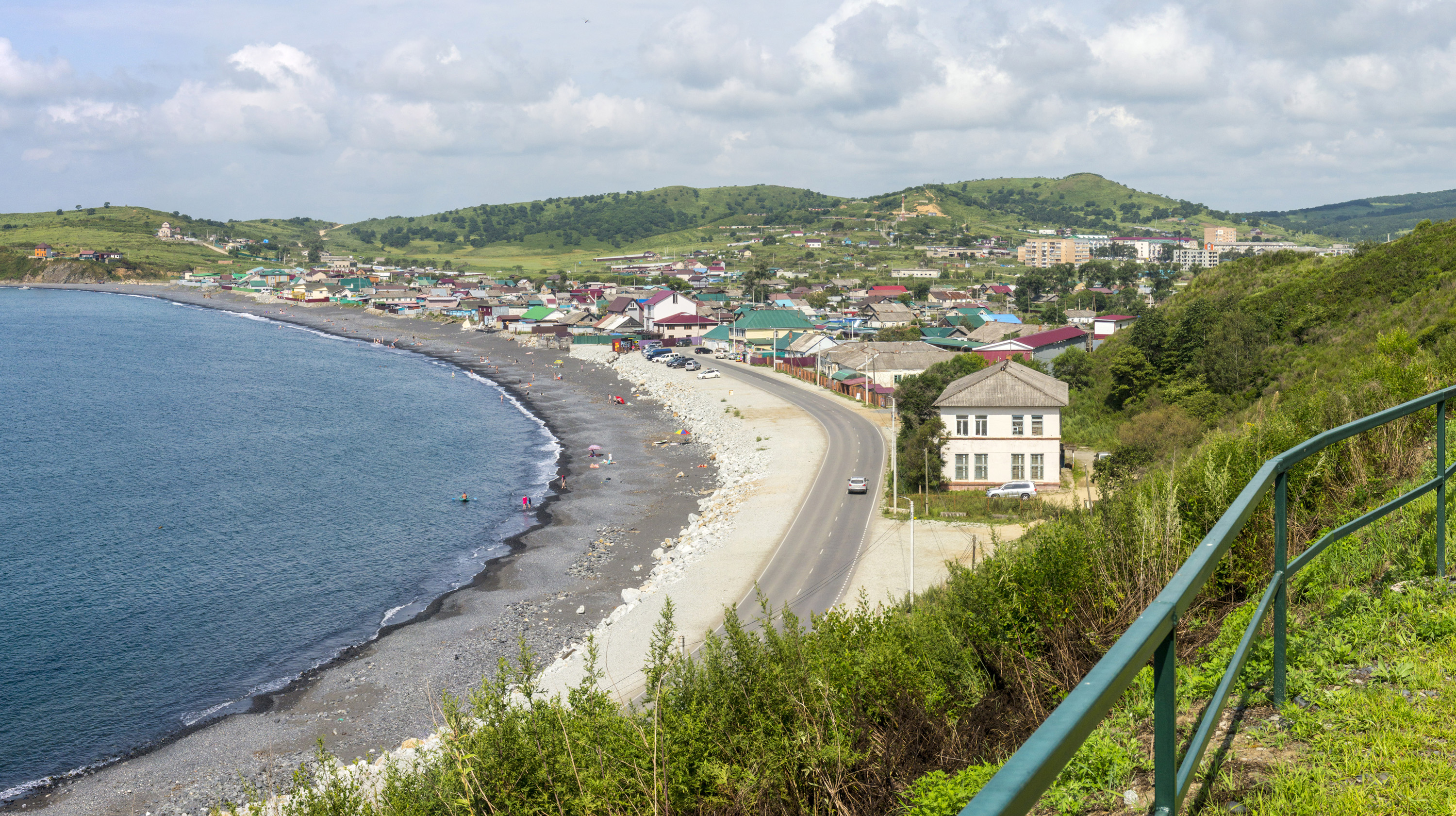
- Interactive map of Zarubino
- Location of Zarubino Zarubino (Primorsky Krai)
- Coordinates: 42°38′N 131°04′E
- Country: Russia
- Federal subject: Primorsky Krai
- Administrative district: Khasansky District
- Founded: October 18, 1928
- Urban-type settlement status since: 1940

Population (2010 Census)
  - Total: 3,101
  - Estimate (2023): 2,515 (−18.9%)
- Time zone: UTC+10 (MSK+7)
- Postal codes: 692725, 692726
- Dialing code: +7 42331
- OKTMO ID: 05648153051

Zarubino (Russian: Зару́бино) is an urban locality (an urban-type settlement) in Khasansky District of Primorsky Krai, Russia and a port on the Posyet Bay. Population: 3,101 (2010 census); 3,522 (2002 census); 5,306 (1989 Soviet census).

== History ==
It was established on October 18, 1928.

== Transportation ==
The Port of Zarubino serves the settlement. In September 2014 a joint Chinese-Russian plan was announce to expand its capacity to 60 million tonnes per year which would make it one of the largest ports in north Asia. There is a ferry across the gulf to Sokcho.

A railway line from the port connects to railway lines running north to Vladivostok, west to Jilin Province in China and south to Rajin in North Korea via Khasan, respectively.
