= Kraskino =

Kraskino Краскино
- Urban-type settlement
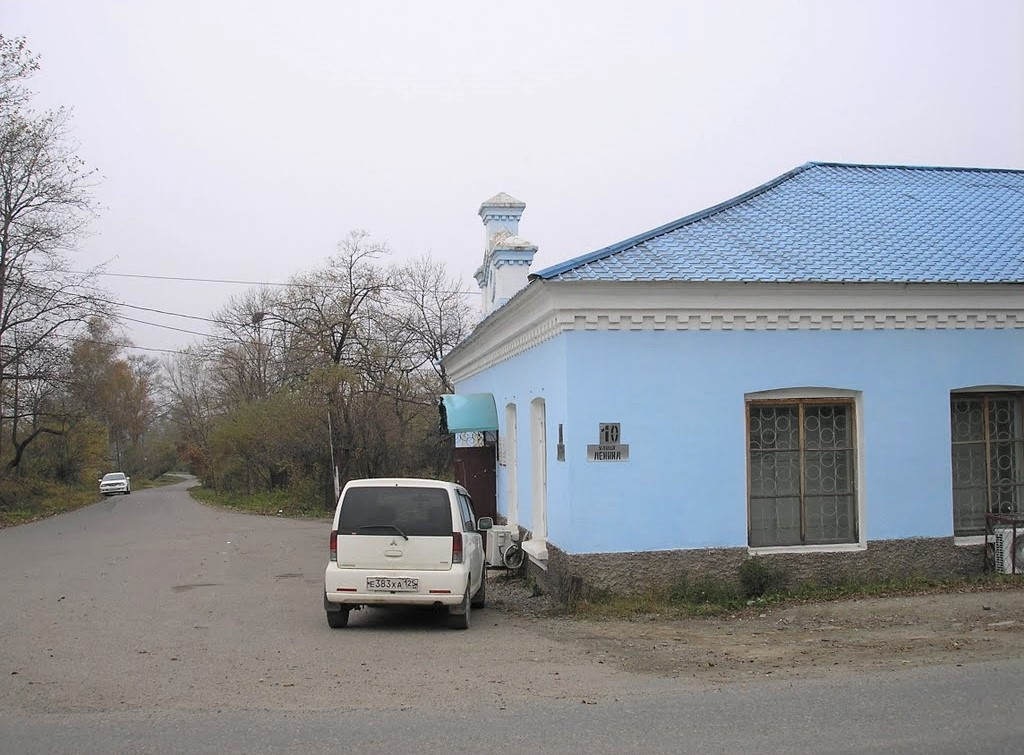
- Lenin street in Kraskino
- Interactive map of Kraskino
- Location of Kraskino Kraskino (Primorsky Krai)
- Coordinates: 42°42′30″N 130°46′55″E
- Country: Russia
- Federal subject: Primorsky Krai
- Administrative district: Khasansky District
- 1900
- Urban-type settlement status since: 1940

Population (2010 Census)
  - Total: 3,256
  - Estimate (2023): 2,363 (−27.4%)

Municipal status
  - Municipal district: Khasansky Municipal District
  - Urban settlement: Kraskinskoye Urban Settlement
  - Capital of: Kraskinskoye Urban Settlement
- Time zone: UTC+10 (MSK+7)
- Postal code: 692715
- Dialing code: +7 42331
- OKTMO ID: 05648155051

Kraskino (Russian: Кра́скино) is an urban locality (an urban-type settlement) in Khasansky District of Primorsky Krai, Russia, located on the shore of the Posyet Bay, 282 kilometers (175 mi) southwest of Vladivostok, near the border with North Korea. Population: 3,256 (2010 census); 3,451 (2002 census); 4,426 (1989 Soviet census).

== History ==
It was founded in 1900 as Novokiyevskoye (Новоки́евское). In 1936, it was given its present name, for Lieutenant Mikhail Kraskin, who died in a border conflict. Urban-type settlement status was granted to it in 1940.

== Transportation ==
In 1992, the Chinese border checkpoint facility at Hunchun-Chenglingzi was opened and in June 1995 the new Chinese-funded and built passenger and cargo border immigration and customs checkpoint at Kraskino on the Russian side was completed. In 1995, a 30-kilometer-long (19 mi) highway, an upgrade from heavily rutted gravel road, Kraskino (Makhalino station) and Hunchun (Chenglingzi border) was completed. In June 1997, the new Russian Kraskino Customs Office Building was opened. Also, between June 1997 and June 1999 railway infrastructure (marshaling yards, freight handling facilities) was constructed at Makhalino station.

A railway line connecting Jilin Province in China and Vladivostok in Russia, running through Kraskino, began operating in February 2010 and was officially opened on November 26, 2010.
