= Lake Khasan =

Lake in Primorsky Krai, Russia

- Location within Primorsky Krai
- Location: Khasansky District, Primorsky Krai
- Coordinates: 42°26′55″N 130°36′29″E
- Primary outflows: Tanbogatyi River
- Basin countries: Russia
- Surface area: 2.23 km^{2} (0.86 sq mi)

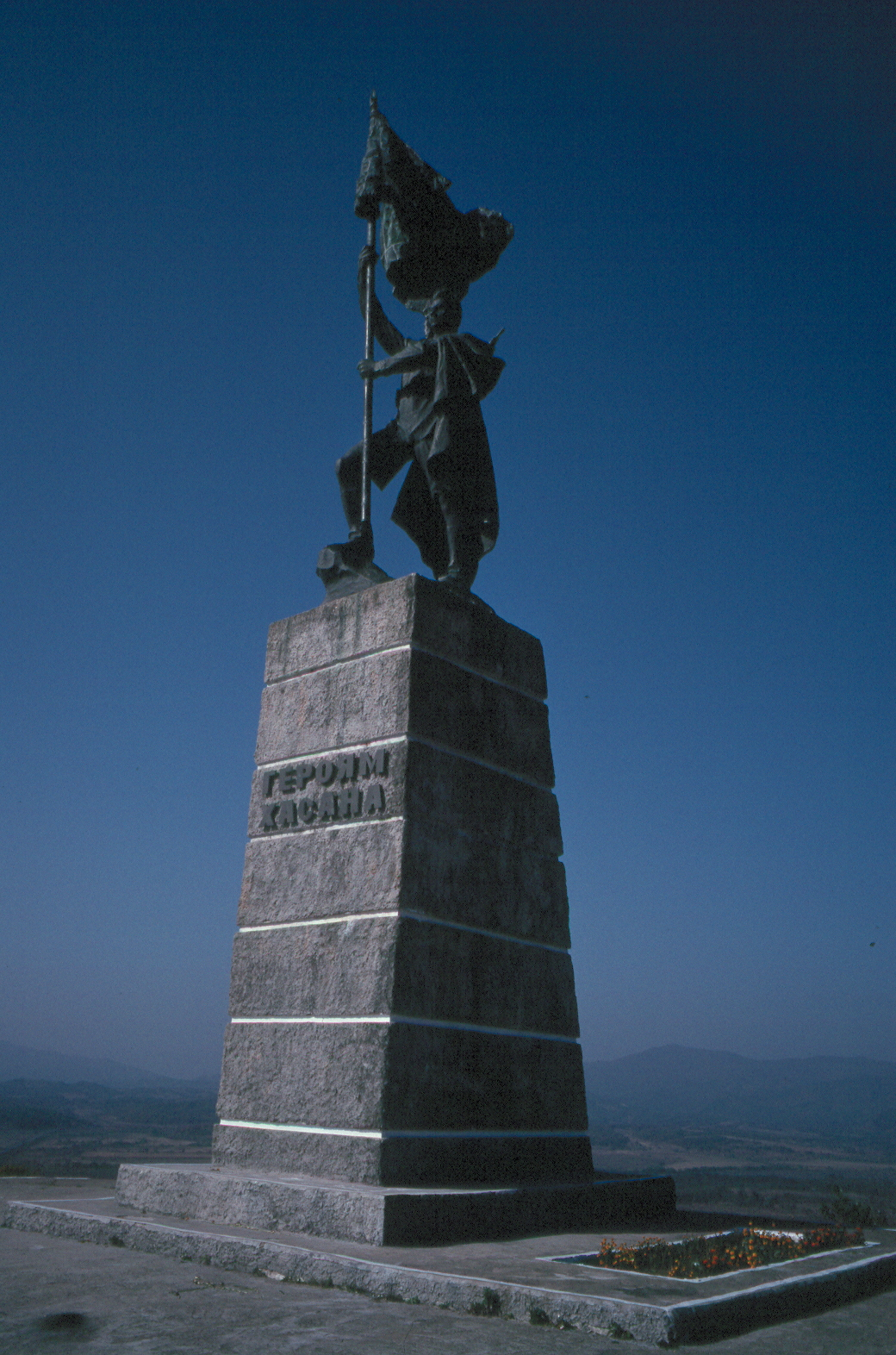
War memorial outside Khasan, on the bluffs where the Battle of Lake Khasan took place in 1938

Lake Khasan or Lake Hassan (Russian: озеро Хасан; Chinese: 哈桑湖; pinyin: Hāsāng Hú) is a small lake in Khasansky District, Primorsky Krai of Russia, located southeast of Posyet Bay, near the border with North Korea and China, 130 kilometres (81 mi) southwest of Vladivostok. It has a surface area of 2.23 square kilometres (0.86 sq mi). The Tanbogatyi River flows from the lake. The lake, described as "the tight corner where the territories of Korea, Manchuria, and Russia meet", was the site of the Battle of Lake Khasan in summer 1938. The lake is near Fangchuan, China.

== See also ==
- Khasan (urban-type settlement)
- Battle of Lake Khasan
