= Posyet Bay =

Coordinates: 42°30′N 130°55′E

The Possiet Gulf or Posyet Bay (Russian: Залив Посьета) is a bay in the south-western part of the Peter the Great Gulf, between the promontories of Suslov and Gamov. It stretches for 31 kilometres from northeast to southwest and for 33 kilometers from northwest to southeast. The coastline, which forms part of the Khasansky District, is irregular and indented. Several townlets are situated on the bay, including Possiet, Zarubino, and Kraskino.

The crew of the French corvette Caprice visited the bay in 1852, giving it the name of d'Anville. Two years later, the coastline was mapped by the expedition of Yevfimy Putyatin, including the schooner Vostok and the frigate Pallas. Putyatin had the bay renamed after Constantine Possiet, one of his associates. In 1855, at the height of the Crimean War, the bay was visited by an Anglo-French squadron whose leaders called it "The Raid of Napoleon", after the first French battleship, Le Napoléon. In July 1938, the construction of an airfield and a submarine servicing facility in the bay aroused the ire of the Japanese and touched off a Soviet-Japanese border conflict known as the Battle of Lake Khasan.

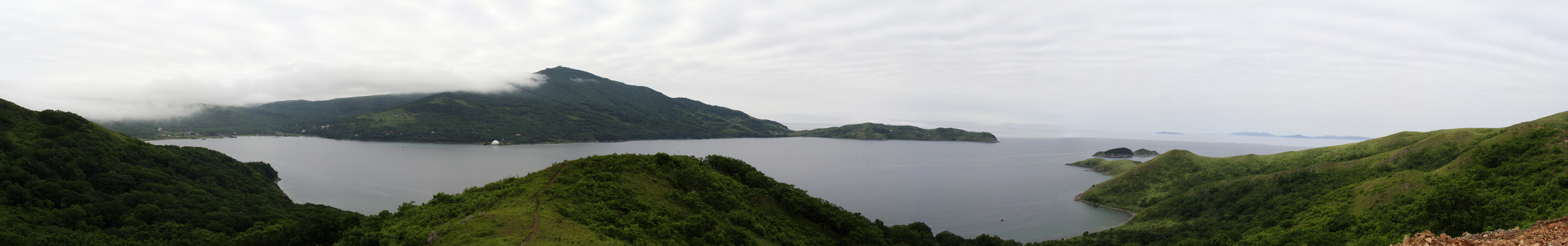
The Vityaz Bay
