= Posyet =

Posyet Посьет
- Urban-type settlement
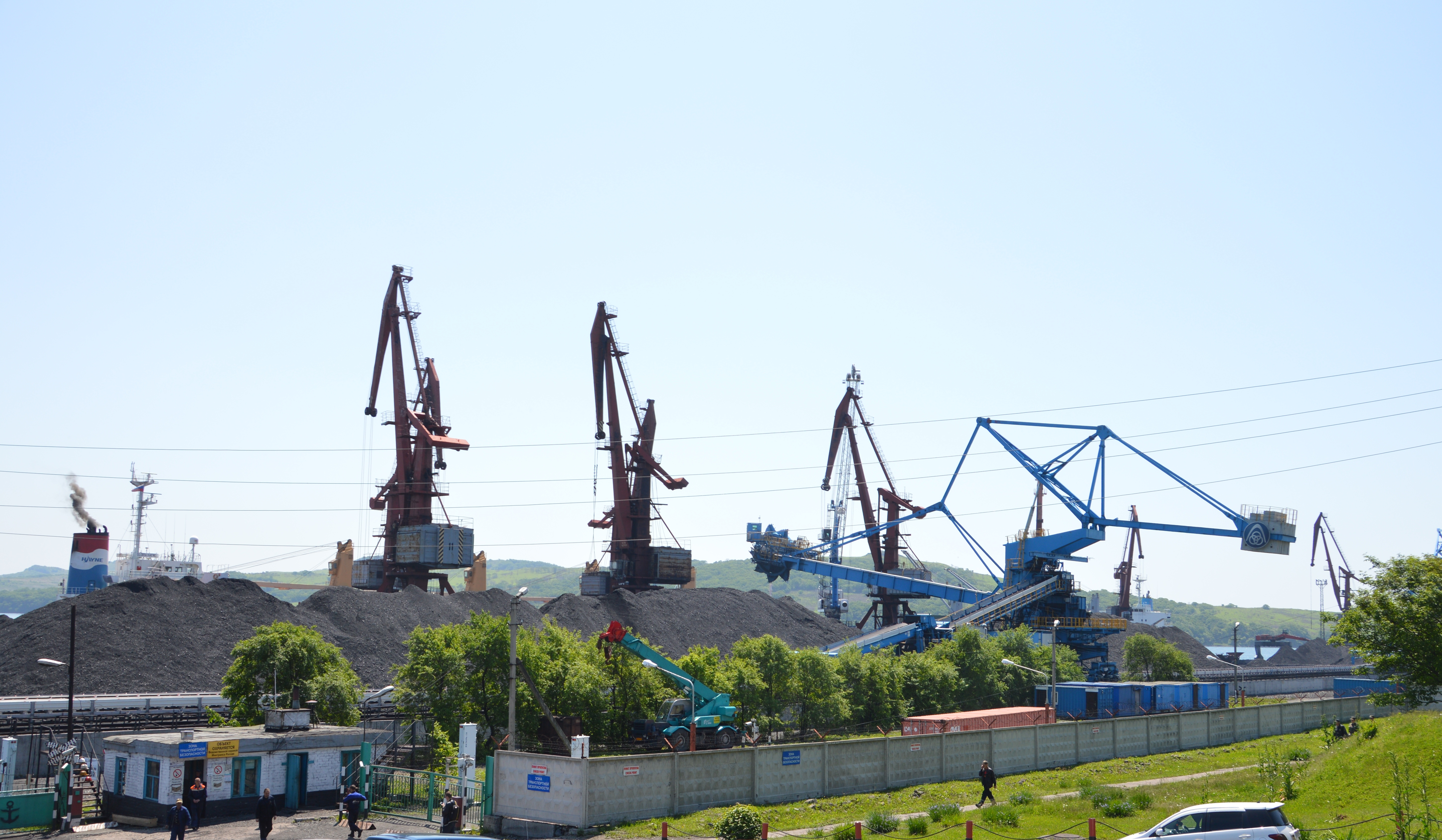
- Port of Posyet, June 2016
- Interactive map of Posyet
- Location of Posyet Posyet (Primorsky Krai)
- Coordinates: 42°40′N 130°48′E
- Country: Russia
- Federal subject: Primorsky Krai
- Administrative district: Khasansky District
- Founded: April 11, 1860
- Urban-type settlement status since: 1943

Population (2010 Census)
  - Total: 1,671
  - Estimate (2023): 1,571 (−6%)
- Time zone: UTC+10 (MSK+7)
- Postal code: 692705
- OKTMO ID: 05648158051

Posyet (Russian: Посье́т) is an urban locality (an urban-type settlement) in Khasansky District of Primorsky Krai, Russia, and an ice-free port on the Possiet Bay. Population: 1,671 (2010 census); 2,927 (2002 census); 2,223 (1989 Soviet census).

== Etymology ==
It is named after the Russian navigator Konstantin Posyet (1819–1899).

== History ==
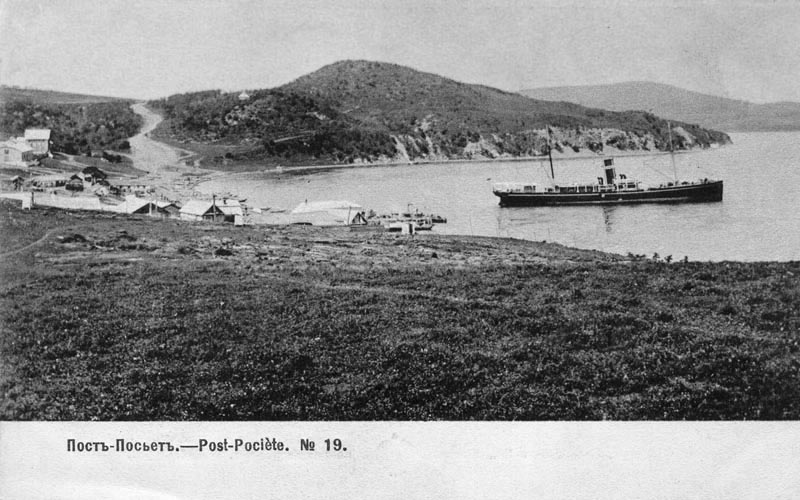
A postcard of Posyet in the 1900s

It is the oldest settlement in Primorsky Krai. It was established on April 11, 1860 as Novgorodsky-Posyet. The name Novgorodsky was given after the bay named by Nikolay Muravyov-Amursky's expedition.

== Economy ==
Largest enterprise JSC Commercial port of Posyet is owned by Mechel. It is in possession of three 450-meter (1,480 ft) mooring lines of gravitational type.

== Climate ==
Posyet has a monsoonal humid continental climate (Köppen Dwb, close to Dwa) with warm-hot, humid and stormy summers and cold, dry winters with little snowfall. Both winters and summers in Posyet are one of the warmest in whole Russian Far East.

Climate data for Posyet
Month	Jan	Feb	Mar	Apr	May	Jun	Jul	Aug	Sep	Oct	Nov	Dec	Year
Record high °C (°F)	10.0 (50.0)	13.3 (55.9)	22.4 (72.3)	27.9 (82.2)	33.5 (92.3)	34.4 (93.9)	36.1 (97.0)	35.3 (95.5)	31.5 (88.7)	28.7 (83.7)	19.5 (67.1)	10.9 (51.6)	36.1 (97.0)
Mean daily maximum °C (°F)	−4.2 (24.4)	−0.4 (31.3)	5.5 (41.9)	12.3 (54.1)	16.6 (61.9)	19.5 (67.1)	23.4 (74.1)	25.4 (77.7)	22.2 (72.0)	15.5 (59.9)	5.6 (42.1)	−2.4 (27.7)	11.6 (52.9)
Daily mean °C (°F)	−9.0 (15.8)	−5.7 (21.7)	0.1 (32.2)	6.5 (43.7)	11.2 (52.2)	15.2 (59.4)	19.6 (67.3)	21.4 (70.5)	17.3 (63.1)	10.2 (50.4)	0.9 (33.6)	−6.8 (19.8)	6.7 (44.1)
Mean daily minimum °C (°F)	−12.5 (9.5)	−9.6 (14.7)	−3.8 (25.2)	2.8 (37.0)	8.0 (46.4)	12.7 (54.9)	17.5 (63.5)	18.9 (66.0)	13.7 (56.7)	6.3 (43.3)	−2.4 (27.7)	−9.9 (14.2)	3.5 (38.3)
Record low °C (°F)	−26.5 (−15.7)	−22.2 (−8.0)	−20.2 (−4.4)	−5.9 (21.4)	0.3 (32.5)	5.4 (41.7)	8.8 (47.8)	9.3 (48.7)	2.2 (36.0)	−7.8 (18.0)	−18.8 (−1.8)	−26.7 (−16.1)	−26.7 (−16.1)
Average precipitation mm (inches)	11 (0.4)	9 (0.4)	19 (0.7)	43 (1.7)	89 (3.5)	100 (3.9)	153 (6.0)	151 (5.9)	90 (3.5)	53 (2.1)	31 (1.2)	12 (0.5)	762 (30.0)
Average precipitation days	3.7	3.9	6.0	9.3	14.3	14.9	19.1	12.0	7.5	6.2	5.5	4.5	106.9
Average relative humidity (%)	55.0	55.4	58.0	68.0	78.9	85.6	90.3	83.6	75.0	66.2	59.1	55.4	69.2
Source: climatebase.ru
