= History of Primorye =

History of Primorsky Krai territory

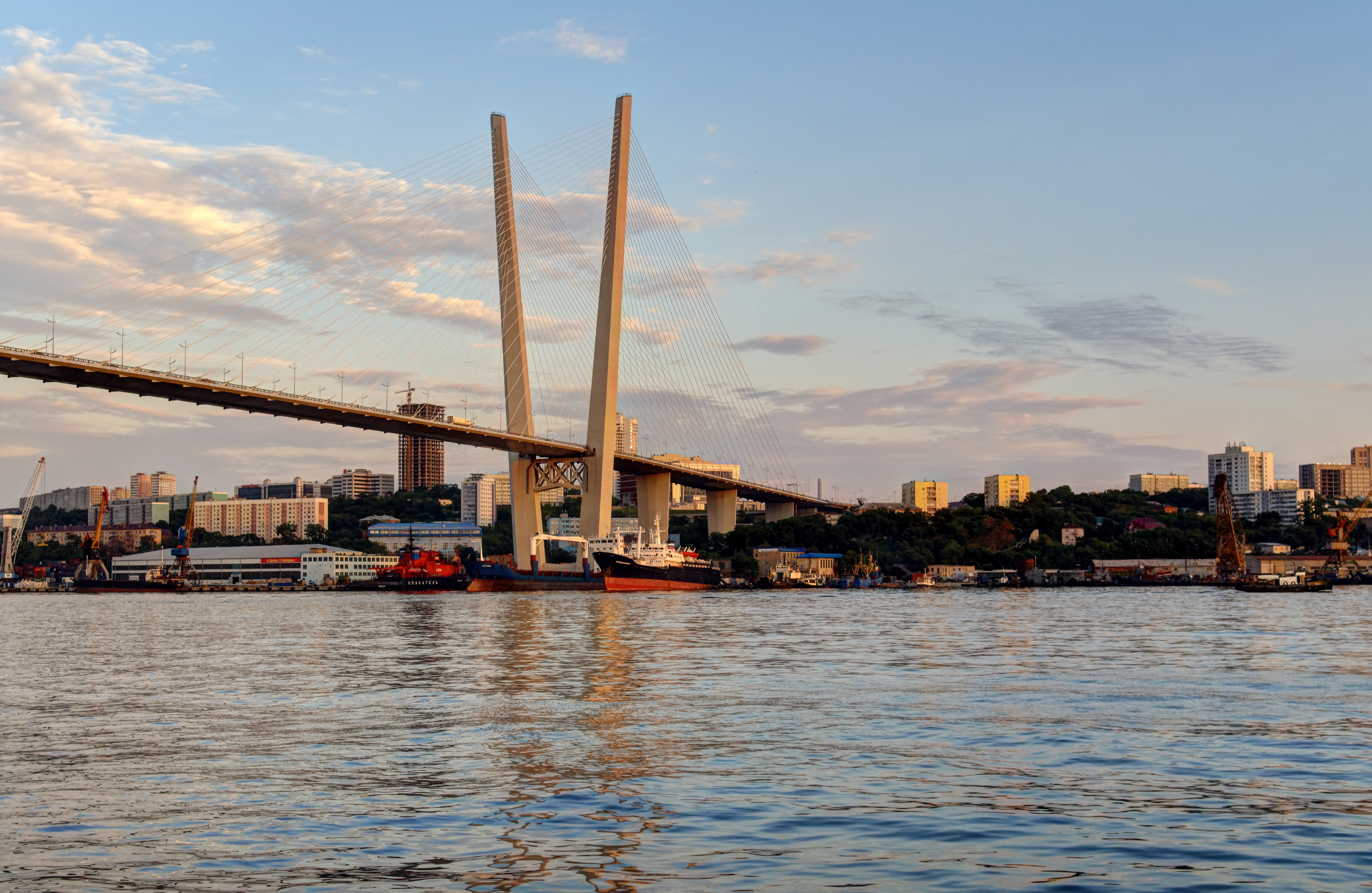
- Zolotoy Bridge, opened in 2012.
- Location: Primorsky Krai
- Prehistory: 40,000 BP: Upper Paleolithic -7300: Neolithic -1100: Yankovski culture
- From the Middle Ages to Russian annexation: Fourth century: Mohe people 698–926: Balhae; 926–1115: Liao dynasty 1115–1215: Jin dynasty 1215–1233/1235: Eastern Xia; 1387–1616: Ming dynasty 1583–1619: Jurchen unification 1616–1644: Later Jin dynasty 1652–1689: Sino-Russian border conflicts September 6, 1689: Treaty of Nerchinsk
- Contemporary era: October 18, 1860: Annexation by the Convention of Peking; 1917: Beginning of the Russian Civil War; August 1st, 1918: Beginning of the intervention in Siberia; April 6, 1920: Creation of the Far Eastern Republic; May 26, 1921: Coup d'état of the White Guard in Primorye; May 26, 1921 – October 25, 1922: Provisional Priamurye Government; October 25, 1922: Capture of Vladivostok by the Red Army; November 15, 1922: Creation of the Oblast of the Far East; January 4, 1926: Creation of the Far Eastern Krai; October 20, 1938: Creation of the Primorsky Krai; 1991: Dissolution of the USSR

The history of Primorye is that of the territory known today as the Russian federal subject of Primorsky Krai (established in 1938), located south of Khabarovsk Krai in the Far Eastern Federal District. It is also the history of the broader territory once referred to by the Russians as "Outer Manchuria" during the time of the Russian Empire.

== Overview ==
=== Prehistory ===
The territory of Primorye has been inhabited for more than 32,000 years BCE by tribes migrating from other regions of Asia. Since prehistoric times, several cultures have thrived in the region, the most significant being the Zaisanovka and Yankovski cultures.

=== Middle Ages ===
Over time, the territory was conquered by various empires, shaped by political and military struggles in China and Korea. It was initially taken by the Korean kingdom of Balhae, during which the region was called Shuiaibin. It later fell under the rule of the Khitan Liao dynasty before being integrated into the Jin dynasty. In 1234, Primorye was conquered by the Mongols and came under the domination of the Yuan dynasty. The Ming dynasty supplanted the Mongols at the end of the 14th century, and in the early 17th century, the Jurchens unified the region. It became part of the Later Jin Dynasty and then the Qing Dynasty, under which the area was named Woji.

=== 1655: Russia ===
The Russians first arrived in the region in 1655, marking the final phase of the Siberian conquest. Along with Kamchatka, Primorye was among the last areas explored and annexed into present-day Russia. This led to a territorial struggle between the Qing Empire and the Tsardom of Russia. In 1689, the Qing Empire formally claimed the territory through the Treaty of Nerchinsk. During the 18th century, French explorers, including the naval officer Jean-François de La Pérouse, mapped the region.

=== 1850s: Western interests ===
In the second half of the 19th century, Europeans, including the British and French, began to take an interest in the Far East, particularly China. The weakened Qing Empire was forced to accept numerous unequal treaties, in which the Russian Empire also took part. As a result, in 1858 and 1860, Russia signed the Treaty of Aigun and the Convention of Peking with China, respectively, allowing the annexation of Outer Manchuria and then Primorye. During the Russian Civil War, the territory became a stronghold for the White Armies and was controlled by the Japanese as part of the Allied intervention in Siberia. The short-lived Provisional Priamurye Government was the final White stronghold in the conflict. In October 1922, the Red Army invaded, capturing Vladivostok on the 25th. Meanwhile, White and Allied troops fled to Japanese-controlled Korea and the Japanese archipelago.

=== USSR ===
The Soviet period saw the economic and military development of the region. With the collectivization of land in the 1930s, many people emigrated to Primorye, which had large areas of unused agricultural land. Gulag workers also arrived in large numbers, tasked with building the region's infrastructure. In 1938, as China was partially under Japanese control and tensions between the USSR and Japan were at their peak, the Battle of Lake Khasan ended in a Soviet victory. In 1945, Primorye became one of the launching bases for the Red Army's invasion of Manchuria at the end of World War II. With perestroika, Primorye experienced the end of subsidies, followed by the dissolution of the USSR, leading to an economic crisis that triggered a massive exodus of its population to European Russia. However, this trend slowed over time due to the migration of people from the Far North to the south and major cities, including Vladivostok. In 2012, the city hosted the APEC summit and underwent extensive renovations and construction projects.

== Prehistory ==
=== Paleolithic ===
==== Arrival of the first humans ====
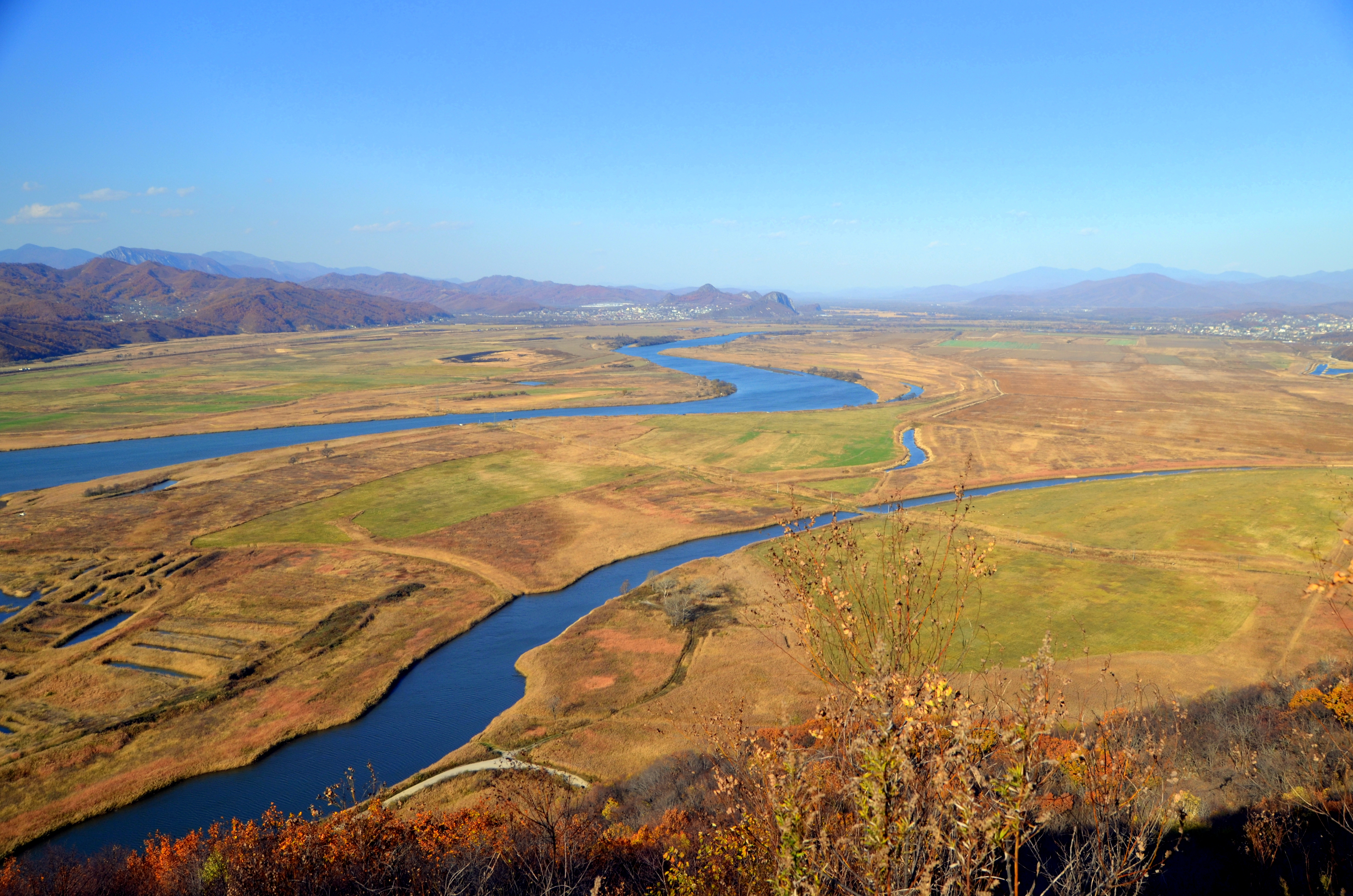
The Partizanskaia valley; Yekaterinovka is in the background.

The settlement of Primorye began more than 30,000 years ago when tribes from other parts of Asia, such as Manchuria, settled near the coasts. These early inhabitants were mammoth hunters and gatherers, leading a nomadic lifestyle and hunting in groups. Their hunting strategy involved driving the animal to a cliff, causing it to fall, then finishing it off before harvesting its meat. The oldest known human settlement was found near the village of Ossinovka (in the Mikhailovka district), possibly inhabited between 40,000 and 35,000 years ago. Ossinovka is considered by Soviet archaeologist Alexei Okladnikov as the first Upper Paleolithic complex in Primorye. However, it is assumed that the banks of the Suifen River were populated even earlier, though no evidence has been found to confirm this. Archaeological studies have revealed deep similarities between the archaeological sites of Primorye and those of the Kuril Islands, Sakhalin, and the northeastern part of Hokkaidō.

At that time, Primorye was covered by vast deciduous forests in the lowlands, Siberian pine forests on the slopes, and coniferous taiga in the high mountains, while pine forests predominated in the northernmost part. The climate of the entire territory was relatively mild, resembling the current climate of Korea, and the sea level was about 10 meters higher than it is today. It was in this environment that the first settlements of the Ossinovka culture emerged (from the 38th to the 30th century BCE). Artifacts from this culture include polished stones and axes.

==== Peak of the last ice age ====
However, during the peak of the last glacial period, the sea level dropped by about 90 to 100 meters compared to the present level, leading to significant climatic changes in the region. Populations from China and Korea settled in the area, while others migrated northward. At this time, most of the territory was covered by birch and other deciduous forests. The mountains were dominated by tundra, with some glaciers on the highest peaks. In the southern part, coniferous forests persisted, while the areas surrounding Lake Khanka were covered with wetlands. Mammoths and other animals were hunted. From this period, the second major cultural complex of Primorye emerged—the Ustinovka culture—radiocarbon dated to between 18,170 (±150) and 10,780 (±50) years ago, though more recent studies suggest its end occurred around 9,000–8,000 years ago. The local populations had contact not only with China and Korea but also with cultures from the Amur Basin, Sakhalin, and Japan, which were accessible at the time due to the lower sea levels.

==== Transition to the Holocene ====
During the transition from the Pleistocene to the Holocene (12,000 to 10,000 years ago), the climate in Primorye was drier and slightly colder before warming by about 1 to 2°C above present-day temperatures between 9,300 and 8,000 years ago. At this time, the main settlements were located in river valleys or along their edges, in smaller valleys. More advanced tools began to appear, designed for cutting and processing meat, as well as woodworking and fishing tools. Hunting, river fishing, and gathering remained the only means of food procurement. Regarding fishing, certain sites were occupied seasonally as fishing camps. During this period, mammoths and other large animals disappeared, leading human populations to shift their focus toward deer, wild boars, foxes, and other small animals. Bows and arrows replaced spears, which had become less useful. The forest provided nuts, mushrooms, and other plants for gathering.

Around 9,300 years ago, as temperatures rose, new settlements emerged, often along rivers and lakeshores, marking the transition to a more sedentary way of life. For the first time, pottery was produced in the region. In central Primorye, obsidian was introduced for the first time in tool-making.

=== Neolithic ===
==== Early Neolithic cultures ====
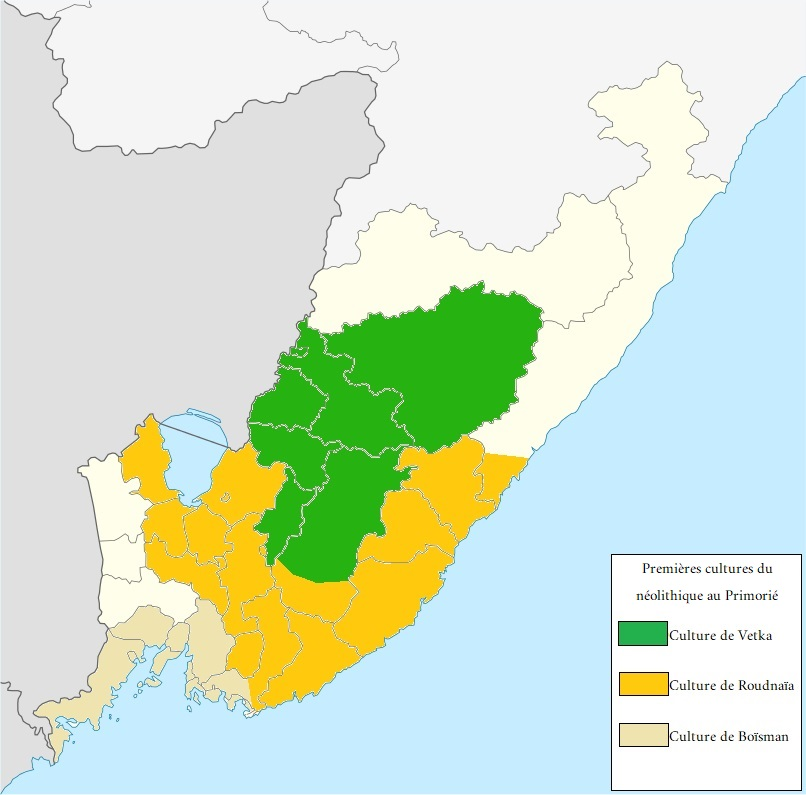
Approximate areas of distribution of the first Neolithic cultures in Primorye.

Between 8,000 and 6,000 years ago, the climate warmed significantly, with winter temperatures averaging 10°C higher than today and summer temperatures around 5°C higher. This warming led to a sea level rise of about 3 meters above the present level. As a result, many sites previously believed to date from the Paleolithic were submerged, forcing populations to migrate inland and triggering social changes. Along the coast, bays and lagoons formed, creating an environment favorable for fishing, shellfish gathering, and marine hunting. It was within this setting that three Neolithic cultures emerged simultaneously in Primorye. The Boisman culture developed around the Peter the Great Gulf, while the Rudnaya culture spread from Lake Khanka to the eastern coast in the central and southern regions. The little-known Vetka culture, which has been minimally studied, evolved in the central and north-central parts, along the western slopes of the Sikhote-Alin mountain range.

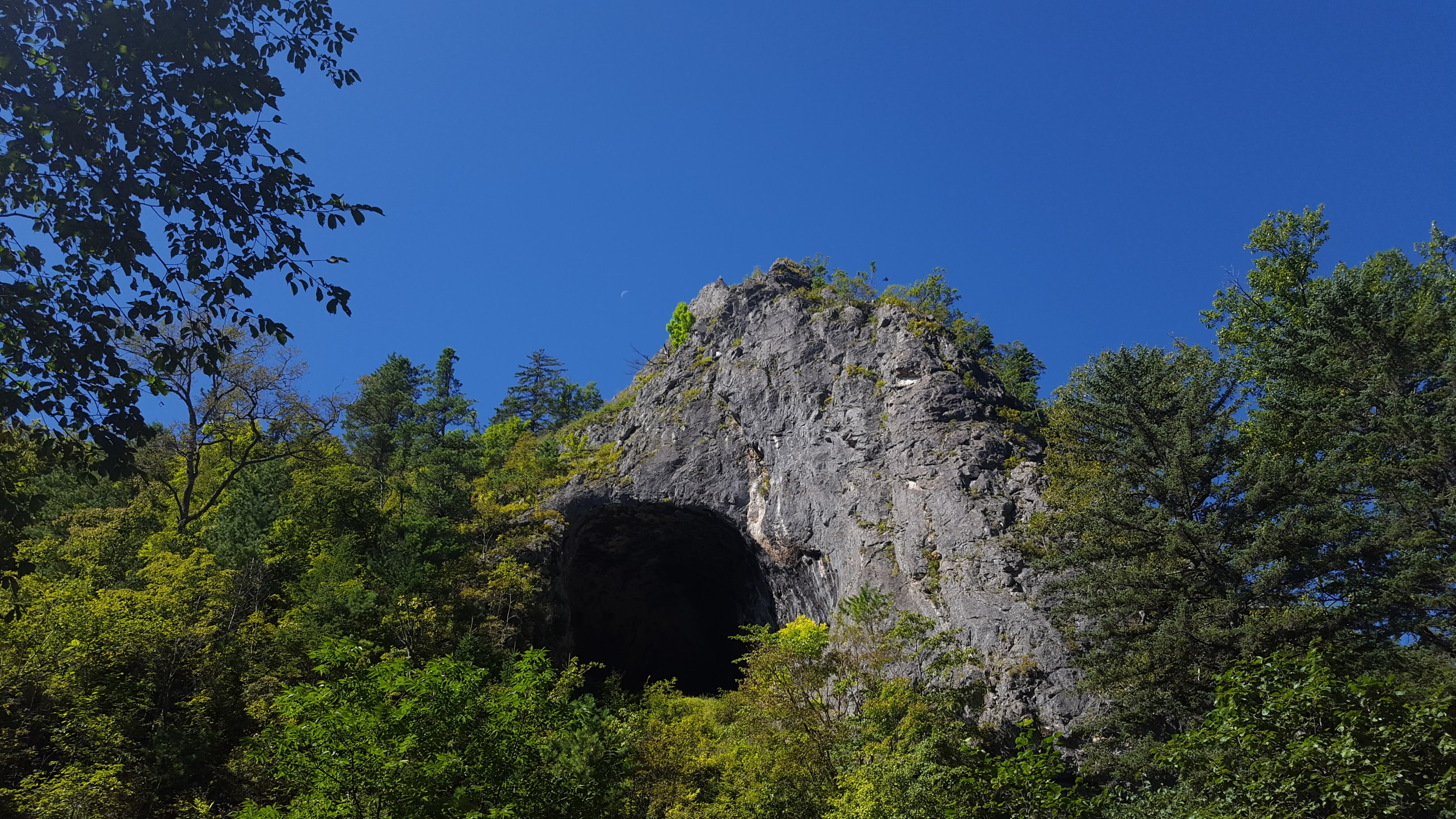
Entrance to the Porte du Diable cave.

The Rudnaya culture emerged in the mid-6th millennium BCE (around 7,500 years ago), spanning from Lake Khanka to the Sea of Japan, near Rudnaya Pristan and the Lazovsky District. Its most significant archaeological site is the Devil's Gate Cave. Genetic studies indicate that the people of this culture were closely related to the Ulch, Oroqen, and Hezhen—Tungusic-speaking ethnic groups from the Amur River region. This culture disappeared in the 5th millennium BCE.

The second major Neolithic culture in Primorye was the Boisman culture, which appeared around 6,000 years ago (4th millennium BCE) in southern Primorye. It was named after Boisman Bay in the Khasan District, where one of its sites was discovered. The culture was characterized by small coastal villages with a few dwellings. Its people were fishermen, catching fish in both coastal lagoons and the open sea during the summer. At the Boisman I and II sites (south of Slavyanka), archaeologists discovered the oldest known burials in Primorye, along with remains of dwellings. Genetic analysis of these burials revealed that the Boisman people had genetic traits halfway between the populations of Mongolia and Japan during the Jōmon period. Additionally, they had domesticated dogs.

==== Zaissanovka culture ====
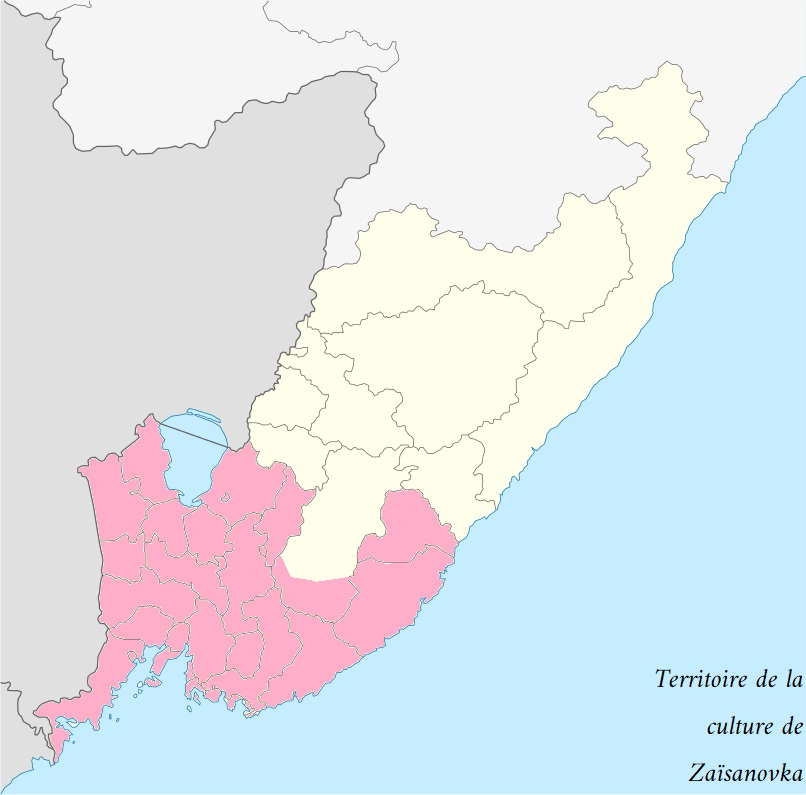
Approximate area of the Zaïssanovka crop.

The Zaissanovka culture was the most significant Neolithic culture in Primorye. It belonged to the Late Neolithic period, spanning from the 3rd millennium BCE to the 1st millennium BCE. It covered a vast area from the Terney District to modern-day border regions in China and Korea, encompassing the entire southern half of Primorye. The culture was named after the village of Zaissanovka in the Khasan District, where the Gladkaia site—the first site associated with this culture—was discovered. The Zaissanovka culture emerged during a period of climate cooling that disrupted existing cultures, leading to their fusion into a single entity. This multiethnic origin allowed the Zaissanovites to thrive in diverse environments, including coastlines, forests, plains, and mountains. The culture is linked to the arrival of agricultural populations who had migrated from northern Korea due to the degradation of Korea's ecosystem. It is also associated with a significant increase in the number and size of villages.

The earliest evidence of this culture dates back approximately 5,000 years, with the oldest known site being Kroounovka 1, located in the Ussuriysk Urban District. Hunting was the primary food source, as evidenced by the numerous hunting tools and animal bones found. Fishing was also essential along the coast, along with gathering, including the collection of shellfish.

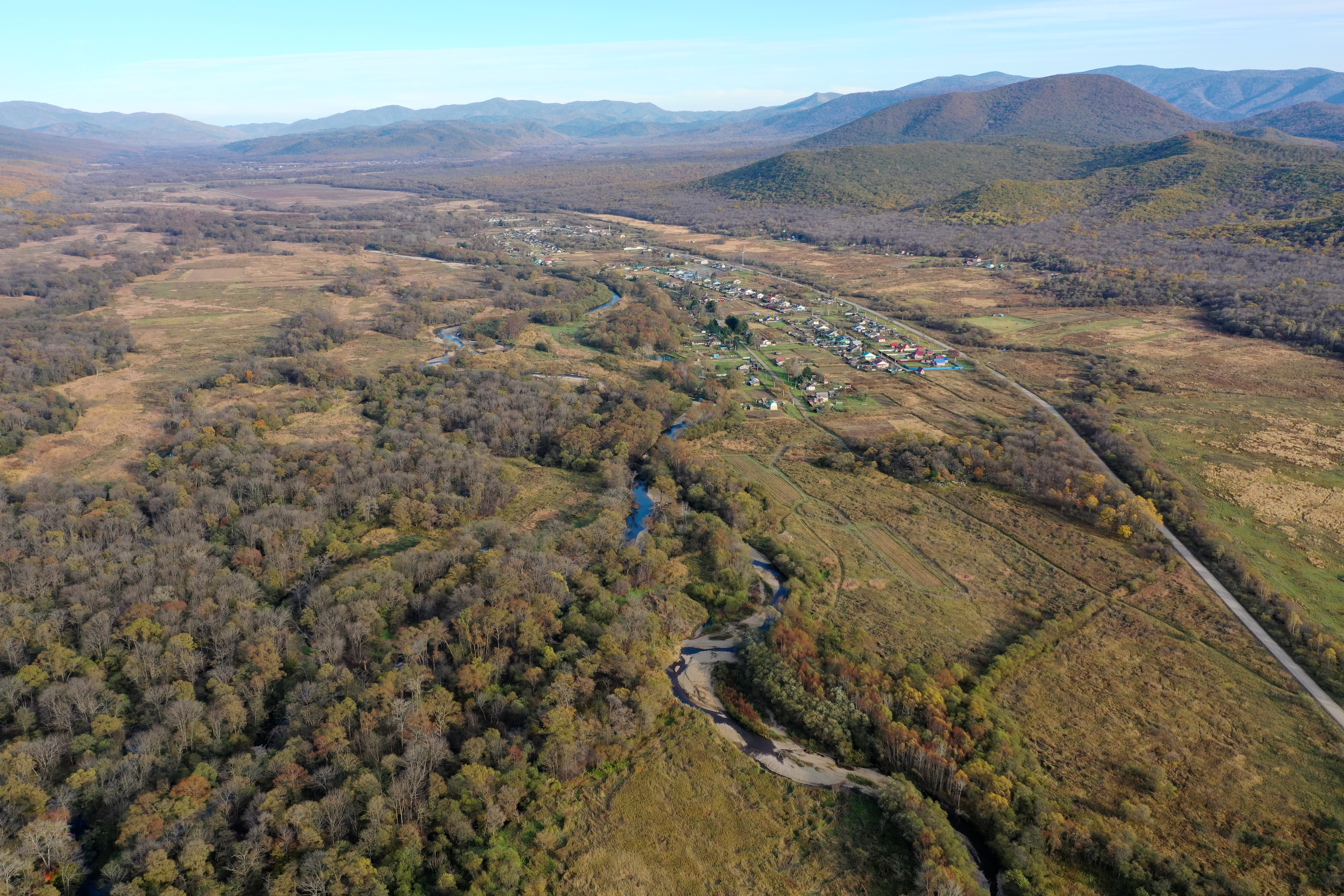
Artiomvka Valley.

However, the most significant revolution brought by this culture was the introduction of agriculture to Primorye, particularly in the Khanka and Suifen plains. This transformation was accompanied by animal domestication, particularly of dogs, bred for their meat. The development of craftsmanship also advanced, with more refined clothing made from animal hides, ornamental objects, and woven baskets for gathering. The dwellings of this period were wooden, with one section serving as living quarters and the other designated for animals and craftsmanship.

The pottery of this culture featured decorations similar to those found in Middle Jōmon Japan and Korea, indicating cultural connections between these regions. The site of Sini Gai, located in the Chernigovka District, revealed that this culture had a deeply rooted sedentary lifestyle, with a community-based organization and collectively managed agricultural land.

The final phase of the Zaissanovka culture occurred between 4,000 and 3,500 years ago (from the 2nd millennium BCE to the 5th century BCE). During this period, villages were established in plains to support agriculture. The inhabitants cultivated millet, which had been introduced from northern Korea, and engaged in extensive coastal fishing. While fishing was the dominant economic activity at the beginning of the Neolithic, by the end of the period, agriculture had taken precedence.

=== Bronze Age ===
==== General overview ====
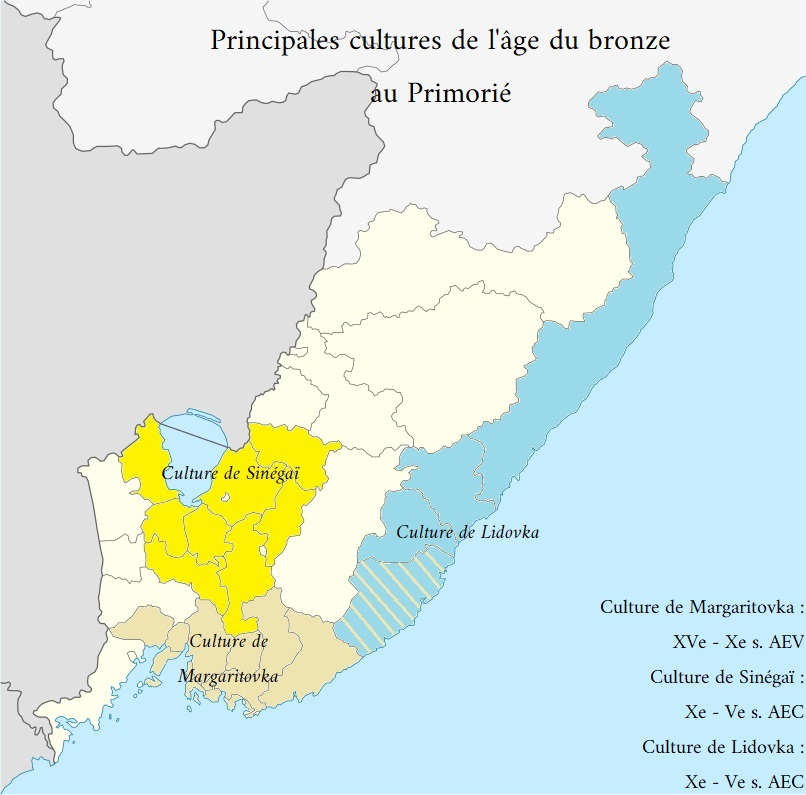
Approximate map of the main crops.

The Bronze Age in Primorye is estimated to have begun around the 15th century BCE, during the 2nd millennium BCE, overlapping with the final phase of the Zaissanovka culture. However, there is some uncertainty regarding its exact onset. Some scholars, drawing comparisons with the Andronovo culture of southern Siberia, suggest that the Bronze Age in Primorye may have begun between the late 3rd millennium and the early 2nd millennium BCE. Others argue that it started in the second half of the 2nd millennium BCE, spreading from China. The primary challenge in determining this period is the region's scarcity of metal resources necessary for bronze production. Thus, researchers must rely on alternative indicators to determine when the Bronze Age began—whether through other cultural developments, the few known sites containing bronze artifacts, or parallels with developments in Korea and Manchuria. The Bronze Age in Primorye is divided into three main cultures: Sinegai (or Sini Gai), Lidovka, and Margaritovka, alongside several unclassified or unassigned sites. The Sinegai culture settled in the Khanka Plain, the Lidovka culture occupied the eastern coast of Primorye, and the Margaritovka culture was centered around Peter the Great Gulf. This period was marked by the expansion of agriculture in coastal areas, particularly the cultivation of millet. The classification of these primary cultures remains a subject of debate and could change with future archaeological discoveries.

The period of these cultures was marked by significant interactions between the populations of Primorye, as well as with their northern neighbors in Manchuria and Korea. Given how villages were built and fortified, it is almost certain that some of these interactions were armed, involving either tense situations or outright conflicts. Toward the end of the period, syncretism also occurred, particularly between the Samarga culture (located in the extreme north of Primorye's coast, primarily in the neighboring Khabarovsk Krai) and the Lidovka culture, as well as between the Lidovka culture and the Yankovskaya culture, which belonged to the Iron Age. This era saw demographic growth, with populations evolving from small groups into villages that sometimes housed thousands of people—or even stable communities of tens of thousands. Finally, this period also witnessed the development of craftsmanship.

==== Main cultures ====
The first of these cultures is the Margaritovka culture (literally "daisy" in English), named after a river in the Olga District. This culture occupied the southern coastal region of the Sikhote-Alin, establishing numerous fishing villages at river mouths. It flourished from the 15th century to the 10th century BCE. During the 1970s and 1980s, its classification was controversial because, in its early stages, it appeared too similar to the Zaissanovka culture. However, new data has since clarified its characteristics, though its exact temporal boundaries remain unclear. The people of this culture lived in large houses and possessed numerous domestic tools, in addition to those used for outdoor activities. Their primary activities included hunting (targeting deer and bears, for example), fishing (pink salmon, cod, flounder, etc.), and craftsmanship (such as tool-making and ceramics).

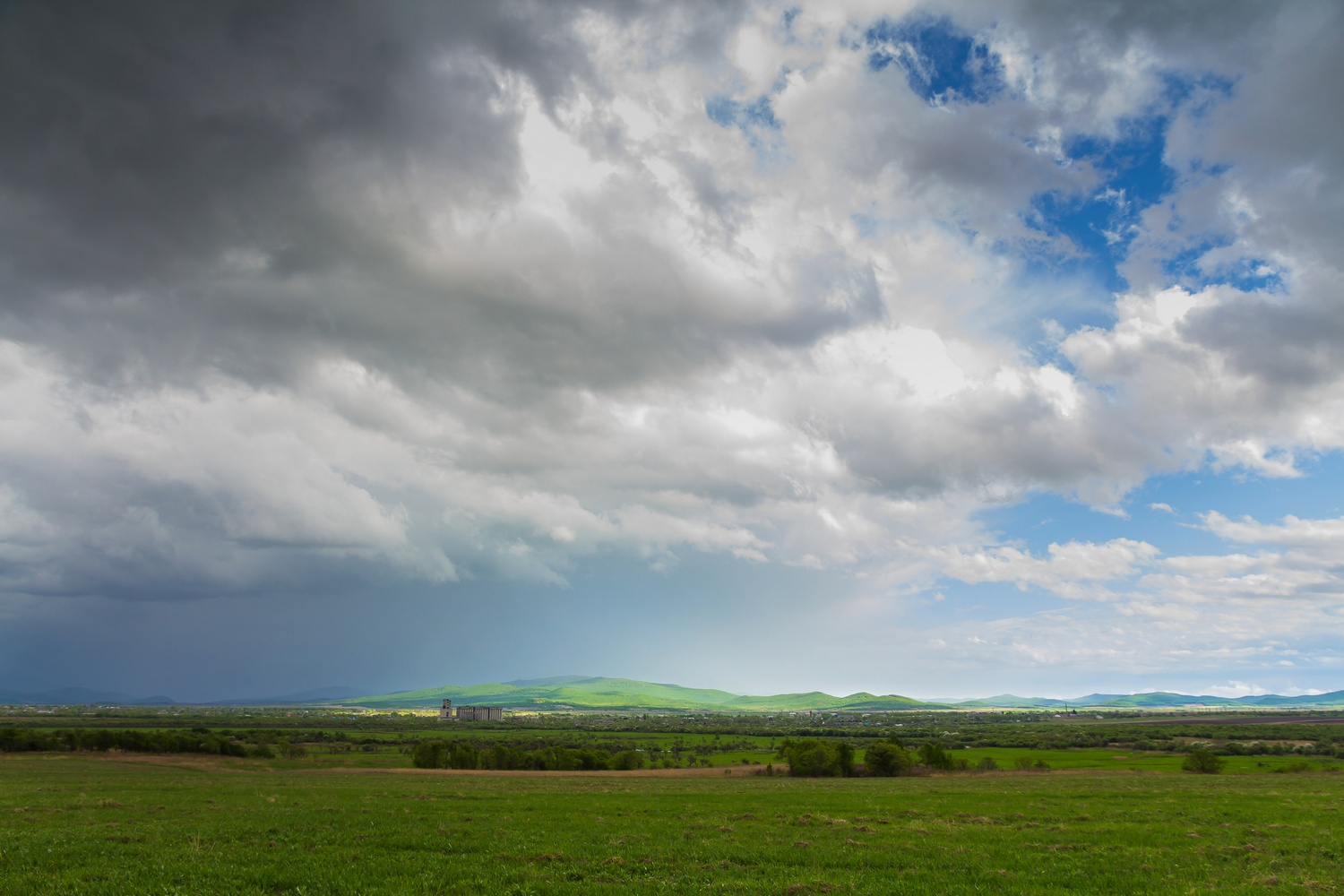
Landscape of the Khanka plain.

The second culture is the Sinegai culture, named after the village of Sini Gai in the Chernigovka District. It spanned the first half of the first millennium BCE, emerging at the end of the second millennium or the beginning of the first millennium BCE in the Khanka Plain. This culture is characterized by terraced villages built on hills, featuring large dwellings, numerous weapons, and fortified settlements with ramparts and moats—indicating the likelihood of military activity. The Sinegai people were farmers who used grain mills, raised pigs and cattle, and practiced animal-related rituals. For the first time in the region, they had a lunar calendar, discovered at Sinegai, likely introduced through exchanges with China. The pig was revered, as evidenced by a burial site in Sinegai containing a pig laid on its back, as well as pig-shaped pendants. It is also possible that the badger and deer were venerated, as burial sites for these animals have also been discovered.

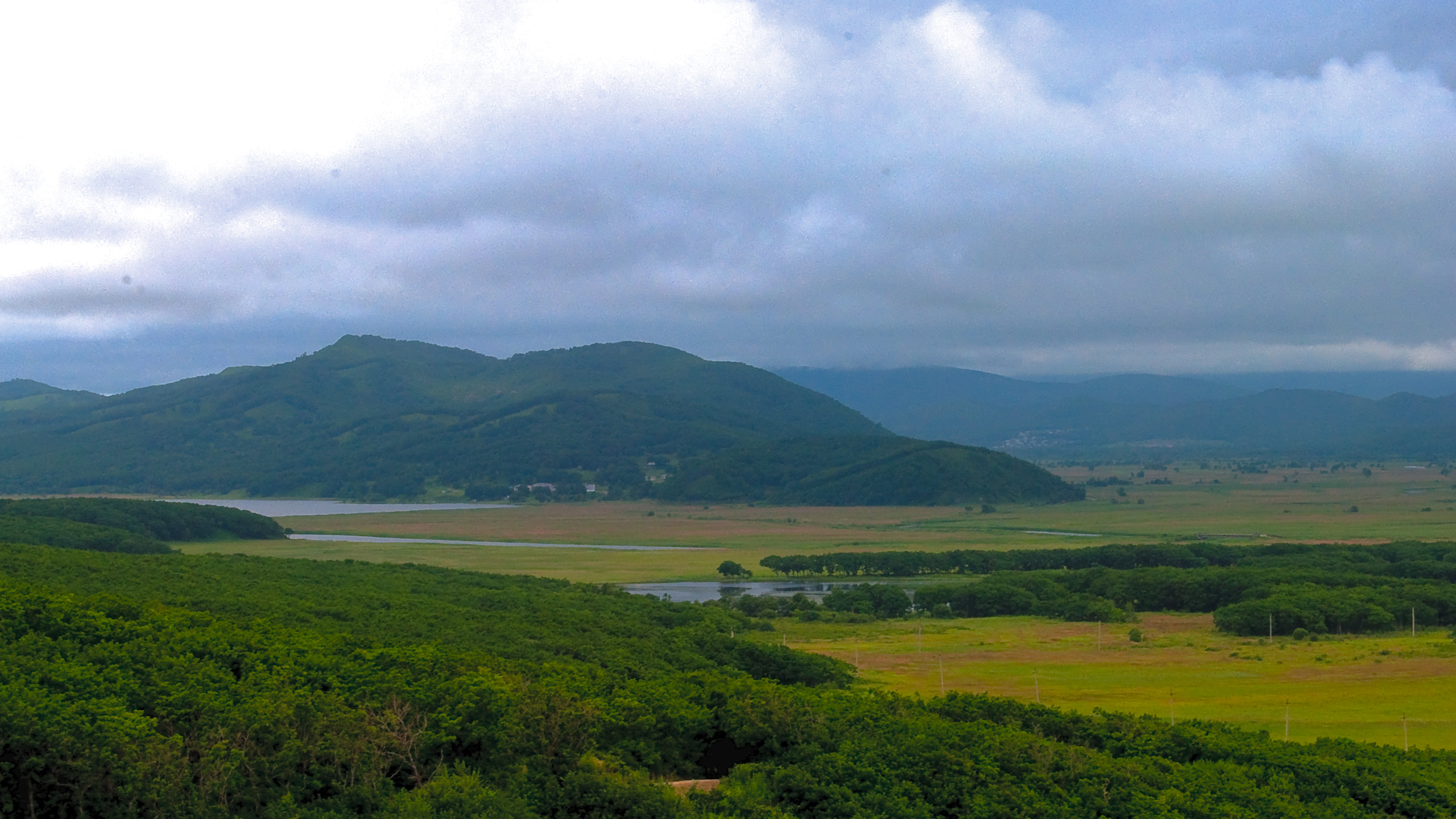
A river valley on the east coast.

The Lidovka culture is the last major Bronze Age culture in Primorye. It was located on a narrow strip of land between the present-day villages of Ternei and Olga, covering several valleys of coastal rivers. Its name comes from the most extensively explored site near the Lidovka River. Existing from the 10th century BCE to the 5th century BCE, the Lidovka culture emerged after the Margaritovka culture but was contemporary with the Sinegai culture. It flourished particularly in the 7th and 6th centuries BCE and represents a transition between the Bronze Age and the Iron Age. Its economy relied on hunting, gathering, and fishing—taking advantage of its geographic location with nets—but was primarily based on agriculture, particularly millet farming. Archaeological finds include hoes, pestles, knives, and cereal remains, but no evidence of livestock farming has been discovered.

=== Iron Age ===
==== Before the common era ====
The Iron Age in Primorye began sometime between the 11th and 9th centuries BCE and gradually spread across the region over the following centuries. Initially, it coexisted with Bronze Age cultures, including Lidovka. The start of this period coincided with a climatic warming phase, making the climate slightly warmer than it is today. The Yankovskaya and Kraskino (formerly called Kroounovka) cultures had contact with Scythian tribes, as evidenced by Scythian arrowheads found at the Kraskino 1 site. The Kraskino culture also had interactions with the Xiongnu.

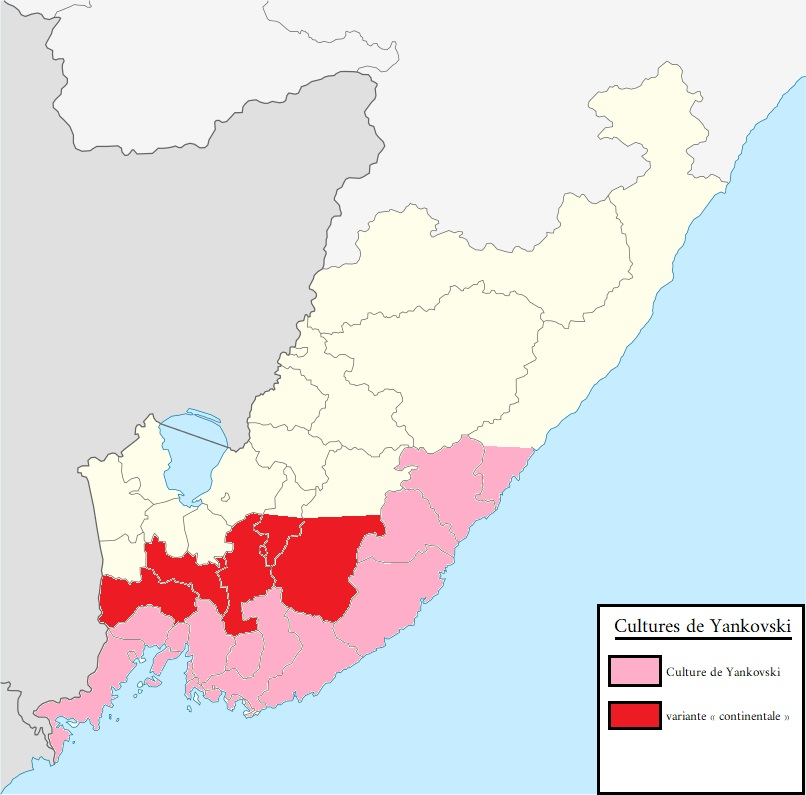
Yankovski style and its continental variant.

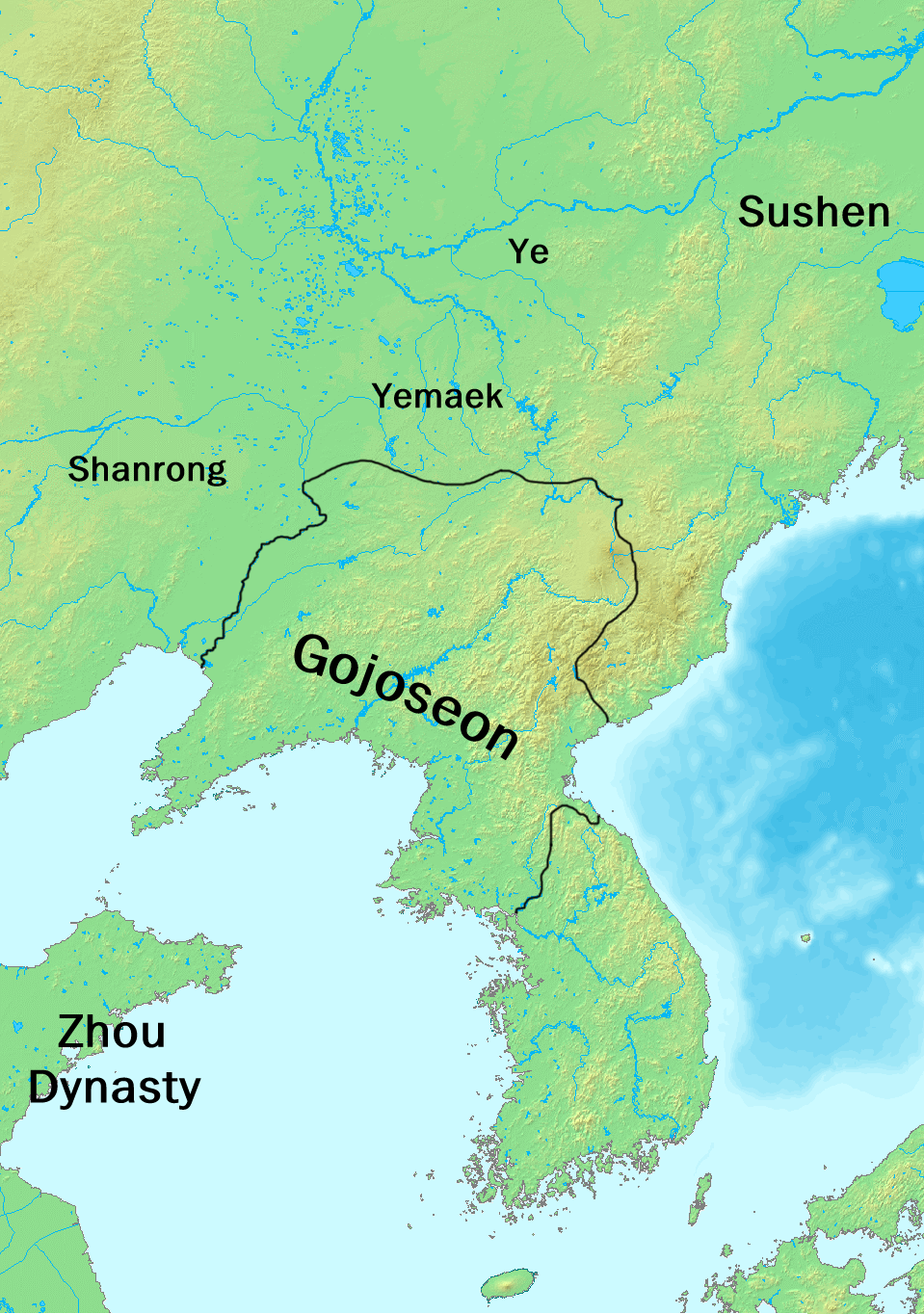
Korea in 500 BCE, with southern Primorye at the top right, with no notable state.

The Yankovskaya culture emerged in the 11th century BCE and is believed to have ended around the 2nd century BCE, although it may have survived into the early Common Era. It is divided into three phases: the first, lasting until the 4th century BCE, during which shell middens were not yet exploited; the second, lasting until the 3rd century BCE, associated with a decline in sea levels and the active use of these shell middens; and the third, from the 3rd to the 2nd century BCE, which corresponds to another drop in sea level (1 meter lower than today) and is marked by economic decline, prompting populations to migrate to more fertile lands, ultimately leading to the culture's disappearance. Several researchers associate this population with the Yilou people. The culture had a "continental" variant, which was very similar in lifestyle and social organization and featured comparable craftsmanship, but it differed economically, as this variant was centered on agriculture and livestock farming rather than maritime resources. Artifacts discovered from the Yankovskaya culture show similarities to those of other cultures from the Amur Basin, Transbaikalia, the Central Asian steppes, and Korea.

Objects from the culture of Yankovski (Arseniev Museum)

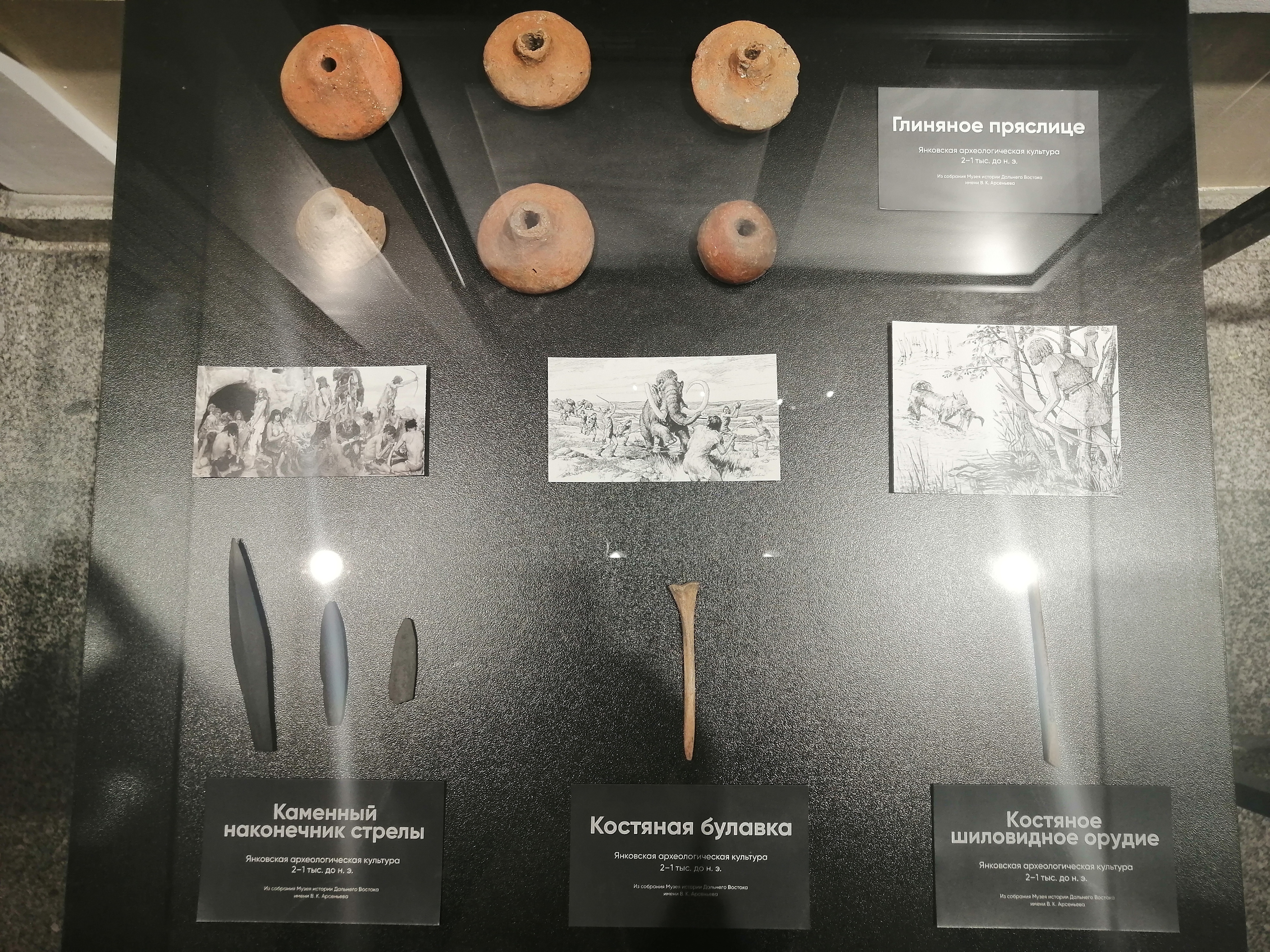
Objects from the Yankovskaya culture.

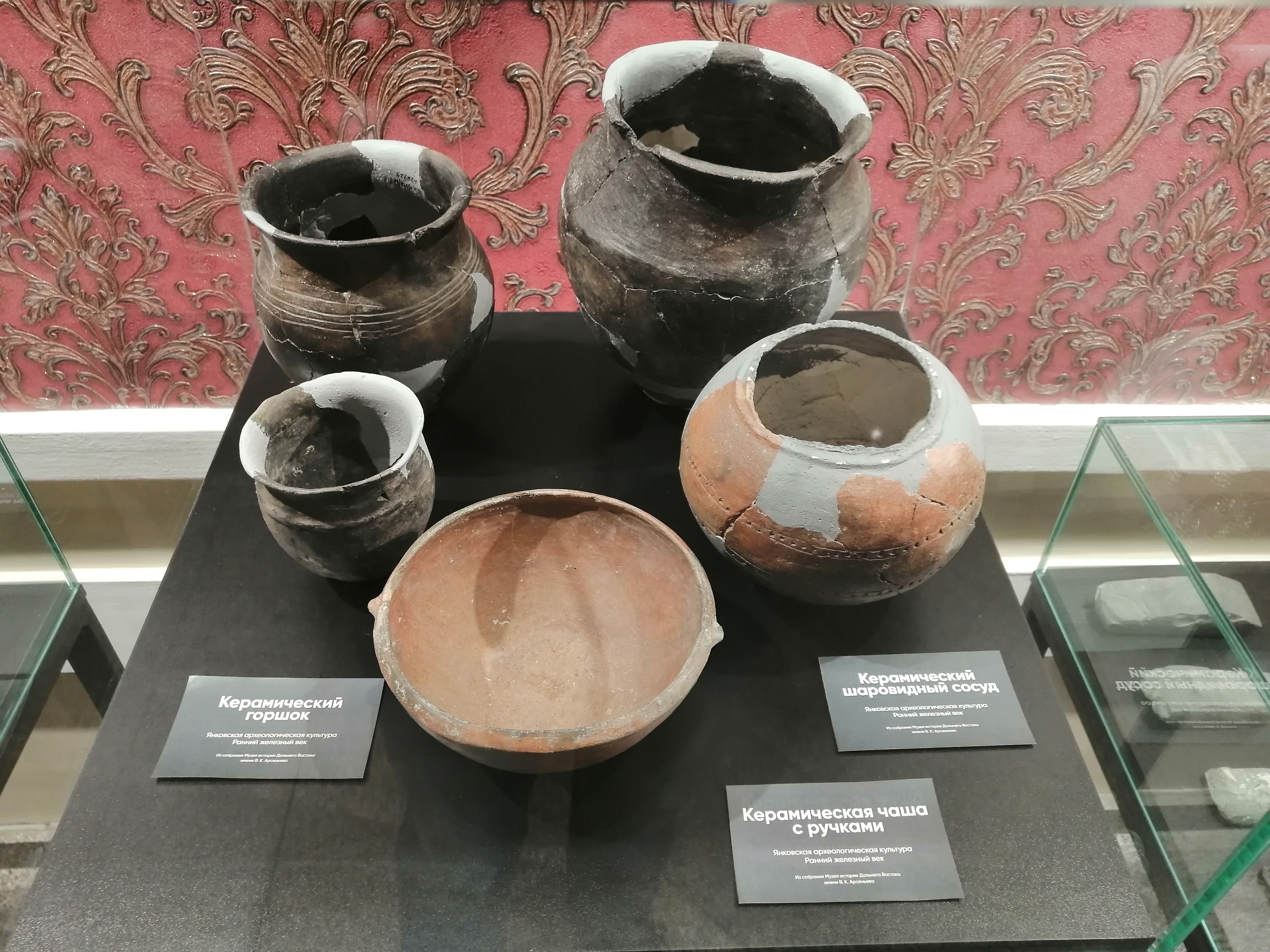
Pottery from the Yankovski culture.

The Kroounovka culture is the second major culture of this period. It is generally believed to have existed between 700 BCE and 100 CE (possibly extending further, up to the 3rd century), and it may have originated either from the Sini Gaï culture or the Yankovskaya culture. Initially developing around Lake Khanka, it later spread to the Suifen and Artiomovka river basins, where it reached its peak. This culture was known to the Chinese and Koreans. It was the first culture in the region to establish a significant societal system, characterized by the normalization of sedentism, metallurgy, the introduction of kangs (heated sleeping platforms), and marriage alliances aimed at fostering economic ties between tribes.

==== Transition to the Common Era and the end of the Iron Age ====
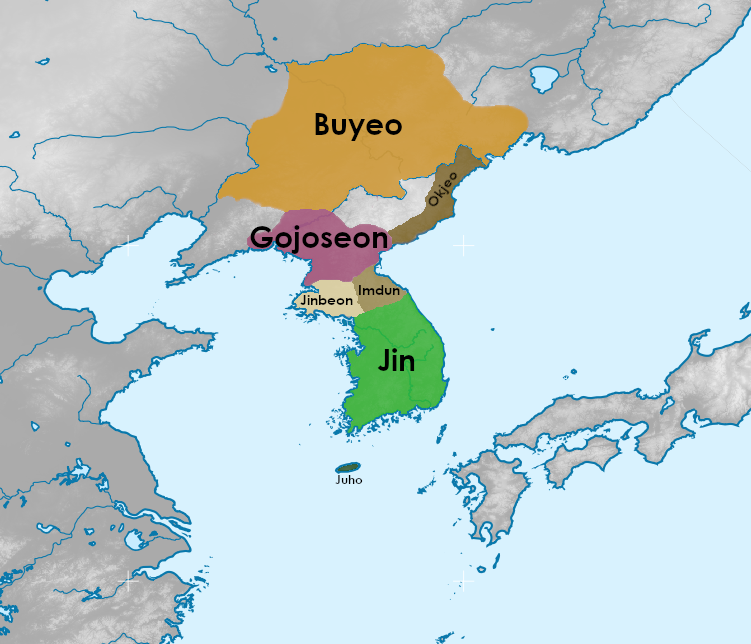
The Korean peninsula in 200 BC.

Around the 3rd century, the Kroounovka culture disappeared, and its people were identified as the Yilou. The Poltsé culture emerged in the Amur Basin in the late 7th century BCE and migrated into the region between the 3rd century BCE and the early 1st century CE. The reasons for this migration were likely the presence of warlike Mongolic tribes such as the Xianbei, rapid population growth, and climatic changes. While the culture remained largely unchanged in the Ussuri and Arsenievka river basins, as well as along the coast of Peter the Great Gulf, those who moved along the eastern coast gave rise to the Olga culture, which spread across the southern and eastern coasts of Primorye. During this period, Primorye saw an increase in militarization, with the construction of fortresses such as the one at Bulokcha (Mount Plemiannik (Note: гора Племянник in Russian.)). The economy flourished, with the development of road networks, enhanced metallurgy, improved agricultural tools, and expanded craftsmanship. Trade connections with Korea and Japan intensified. Socially, this economic growth led to the emergence of inequalities and social classes.

The Poltsé culture disappeared around the 4th century CE, while the Olga culture persisted until the 4th to 6th centuries. According to Chinese chronicles, the Yilou people of the Poltsé culture pledged allegiance to the kingdom of Puyŏ, although it did not exert direct control over their territory. The introduction of new technologies, the establishment of hierarchical structures, and increasing social inequalities created favorable conditions for the emergence of a state in Primorye. However, one final culture would still emerge before a true nation formed in the region, marking the definitive end of the Iron Age.

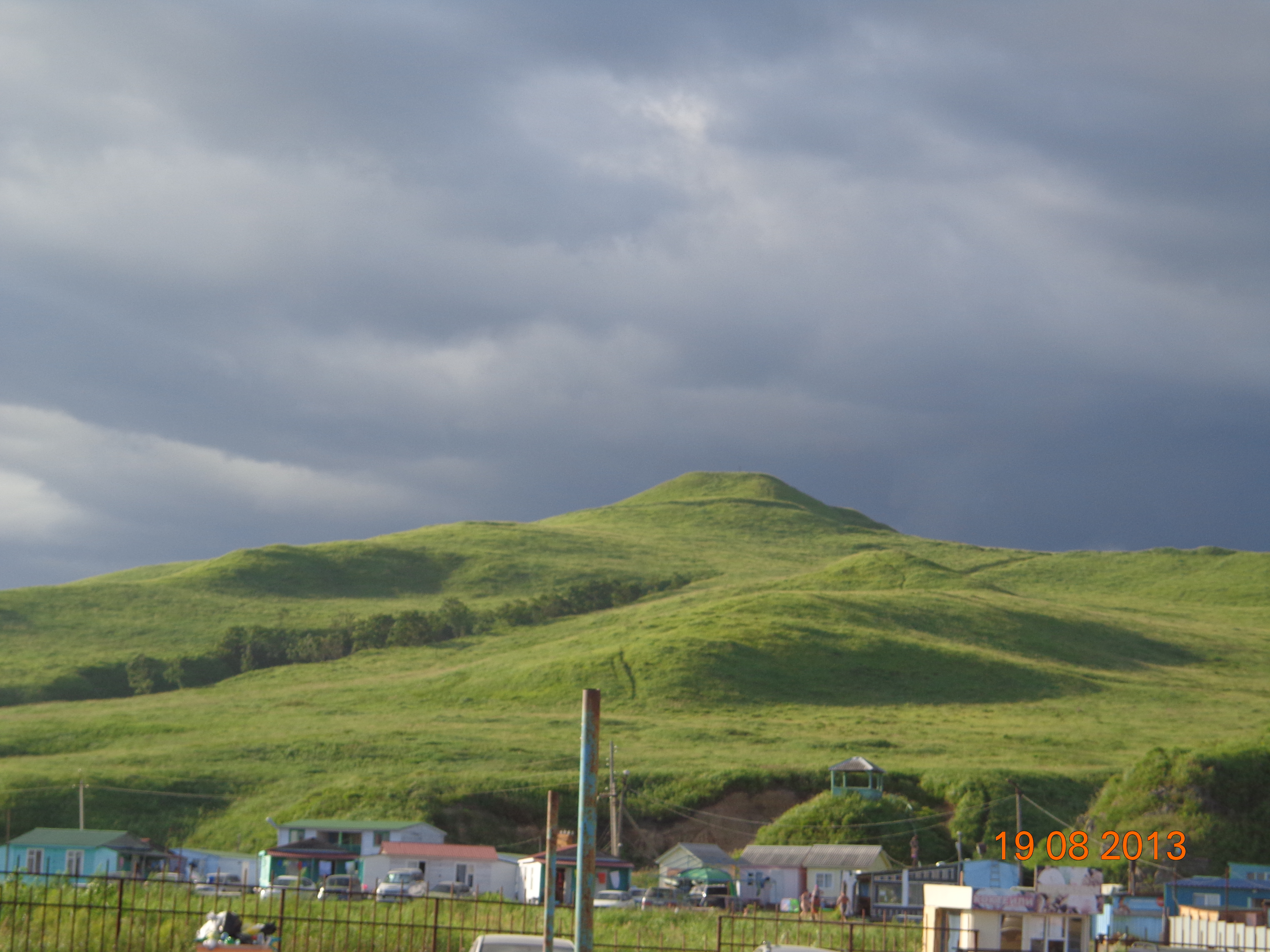
Mount Senkina Chapka.

== Middle Ages ==
=== Early empires ===
==== The Mohe people ====
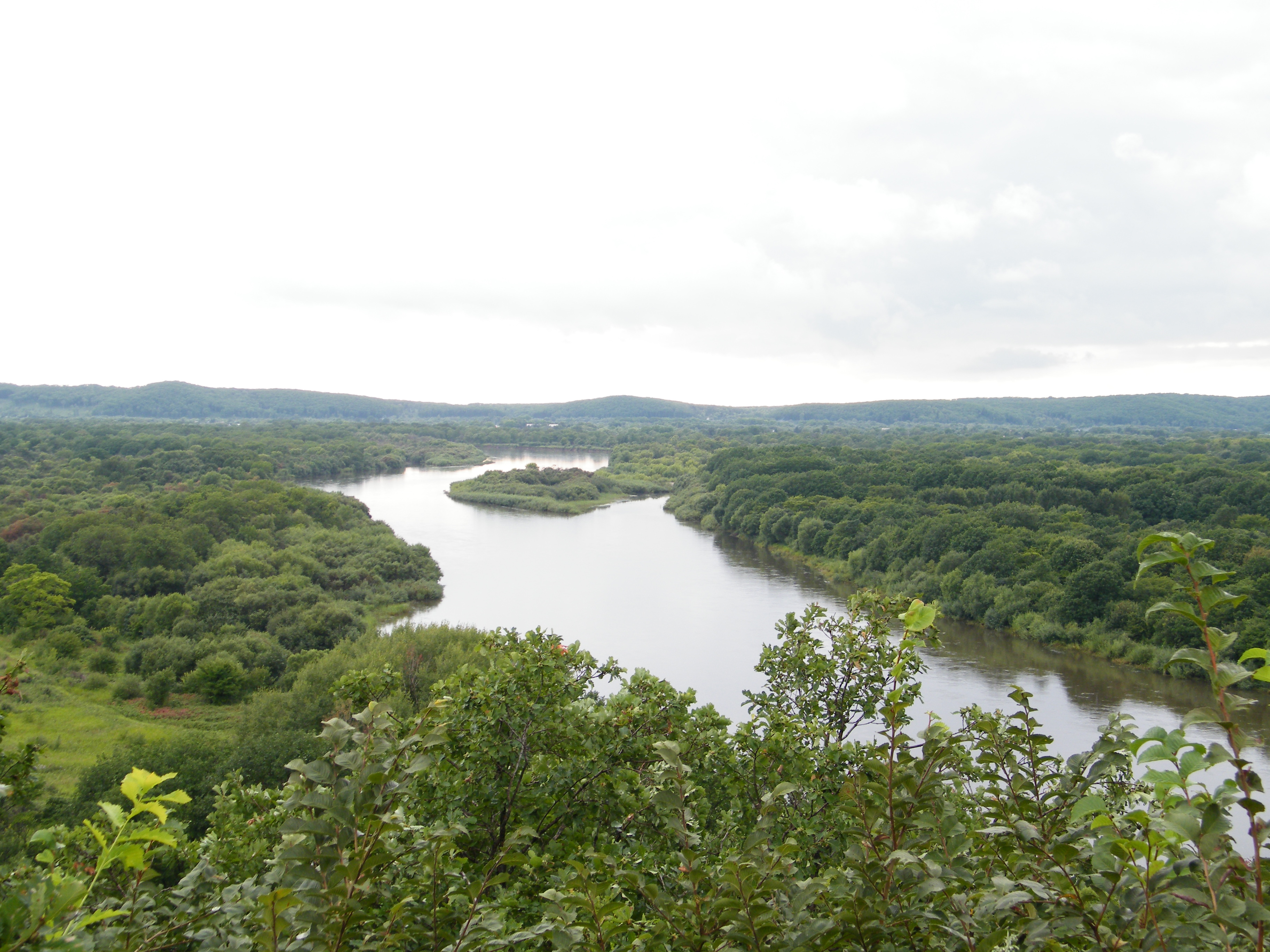
The Ussuri River.

The Mohe (Chinese: 靺鞨) were a Tungusic people mentioned in Chinese chronicles as early as the 4th and 5th centuries CE. Possibly descended from the Yilou and Sushen peoples, their exact origins remain debated. They had a social hierarchy, including nobles, elders, and slaves. Engaging with neighboring states, they were also capable of conducting raids on their adversaries. This period marked the transition from a tribal way of life to form a state. The Mohe practiced extensive agriculture and livestock farming. According to Chinese records, by the 7th century, there were several dozen Mohe tribes, seven of which were particularly renowned and influential: the Sumo, Gudo, Anchegu, Baishan, Haoshi, Heishui, and Fune. These tribes generally refrained from interfering in each other's affairs but would unite against external enemies. Among them, the Heishui Mohe lived in the Sungari, Ussuri, and Amur river basins, while the Khaoshi Mohe, a lesser-known tribe, inhabited the eastern coast and part of Peter the Great Gulf. (Note: The other six famous tribes were all located in Manchuria.) Mohe settlements were strategically located at river confluences and featured defensive structures, including multi-layered ramparts and moats.

Some Mohe clans were vassals of Goguryeo, and in 598, during the first Goguryeo-Sui War, the Mohe came to the aid of the Koreans. In 641, they allied with the Koreans and the Xianbei tribe known as the Seyanto, leading to the outbreak of the Goguryeo–Tang War in 645. However, when the war ended in 668 with the defeat of Goguryeo and its allies, many people fled to Manchuria and Primorye, where the Mohe held control. As punishment, several Mohe tribes were forced into vassalage under China and scattered, while others were captured—except for the Sumo Mohe, who managed to remain united.

In 691, during political turmoil in China, the Khitans rebelled against Wu Zetian, causing many inhabitants of Liaoning to flee back to the former lands of Goguryeo, including many Mohe who had been held captive in China for over 30 years. China attempted to appease the leaders of these fugitives, Dae Jungsang (Qiqi Zhongxiang) and Geolsa Biu (Qisi Biyu), by offering them noble titles, but both refused. This led to the Battle of Tianmenling in 698 in Jilin, where the Mohe and Koreans fought against a Chinese army commanded by General Li Kaigu. Daejoyeong, of Mohe origin and the son of Dae Jungsang, emerged victorious after his father's death and declared himself the king of Jin, the initial name of the Balhae kingdom.

==== Balhae ====
In 713, Jin was renamed Balhae when the kingdom accepted vassal status under China, forming an official alliance. Balhae's territory encompassed northern Korea, parts of Jilin, and the southwestern Primorye region. The Sumo Mohe were an integral part of the kingdom, and Balhae subsequently conquered many other Mohe territories. Numerous battles took place as Balhae expanded its domain, particularly during the mid-8th century. The kingdom constructed small forts and fortresses to secure its holdings. In 726, Balhae's most formidable opposition arose—the Heishui Mohe, who sought to maintain their independence. They allied with China, but in 728, Japan pledged its support to Balhae. War broke out in 732 and ended in 735 with a Balhae victory. Balhae annexed the Heishui Mohe lands in the Ussuri and Sungari basins, though not those along the Amur River. At this time, Balhae was effectively independent, despite remaining a nominal vassal of China. Under King Da Qinmao (r. 737–793), Balhae continued its territorial expansion, fully subjugating Primorye.

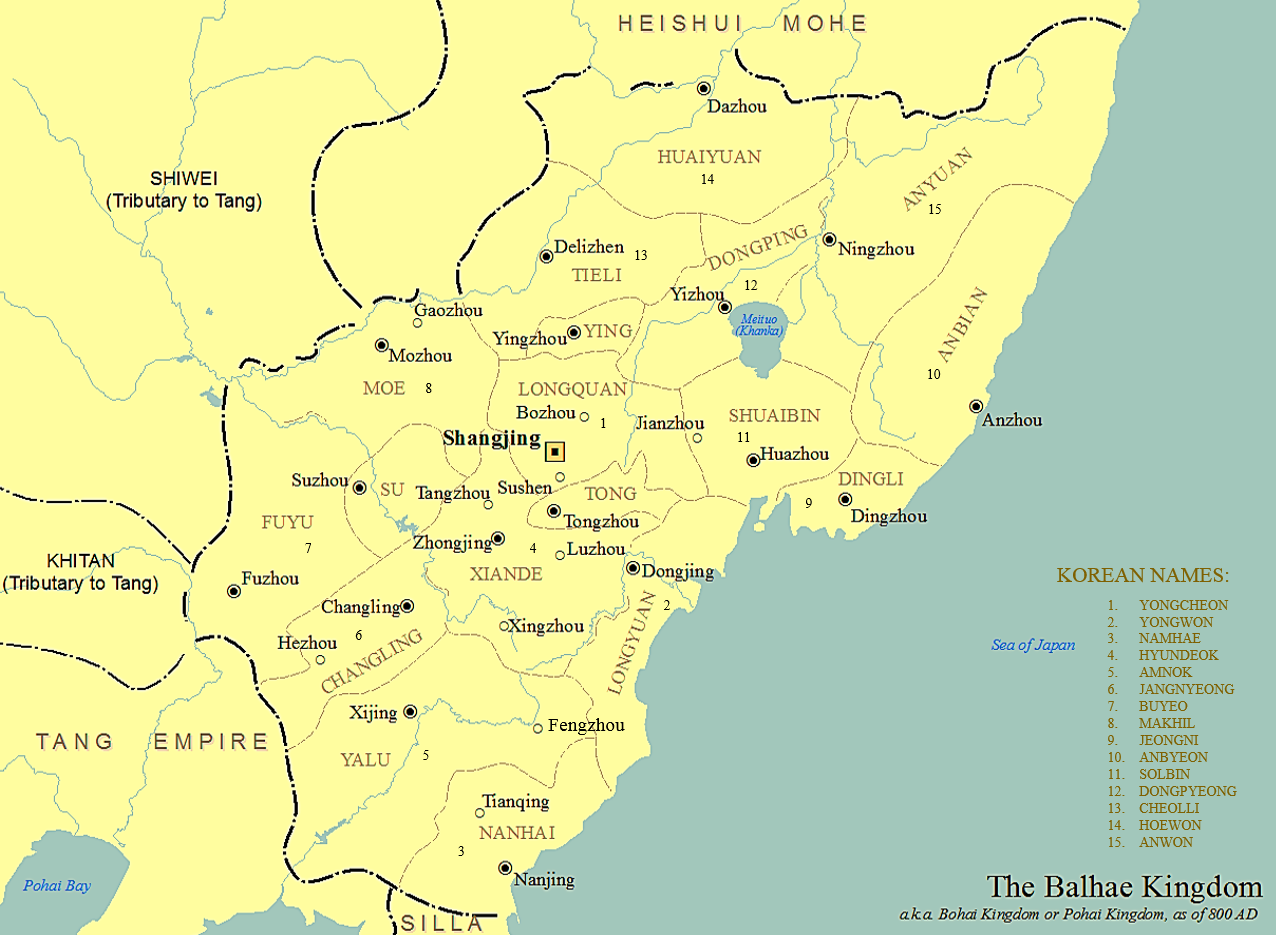
The Balhae Empire in 800, with its regions and capitals.

Borders in 900 with the Balhae Kingdom and the Khitans.

Balhae was administratively divided into 15 regions, five of which were partially or entirely located within present-day Primorye. These included the Longyuan region, with its capital Dongjin, covering northern Korea and the present-day Khasan District; the Shuiabin region, with its capital Yanzhou (Note: Also known as Huazhou or Suibing.) (now Ussuriysk), extending across the Khanka and Suifen plains—Shuiabin being the ancient name of the Suifen River. To the east, near modern Nakhodka, was the Dingli region, with its capital Dingzhou (near Partizansk). Further north, Anzhou governed the Anbian region along the eastern coast of Primorye. Finally, the Anyuan region, administered from Ningzhou, controlled settlements along the Ussuri River. 200 Balhae towns and villages have been identified in Primorye, along with several religious sites, such as the cave temple in Posyet. Multiple Buddhist temples were established in the region. Balhae was a powerful state, excelling in scientific knowledge and boasting a highly literate population. Agriculture played a crucial role, particularly in Primorye, where the kingdom cultivated rice, soybeans, and many fruit trees. Religion flourished as well, with Buddhism practiced among the nobility, while Nestorian Christianity and shamanism were widespread among the general population.

In 907, Balhae went to war against the Khitans, who had just founded the Liao dynasty. The Khitans, a people from Mongolia and Manchuria, had previously been vassals of Balhae. As the war progressed, Balhae gradually lost territory, and in 925, Silla allied with the Khitans. The following year, the Khitans besieged the capital Sanggyeong, bringing an end to Balhae.

=== Under Chinese rule ===
==== Liao Dynasty ====
===== 10th century =====
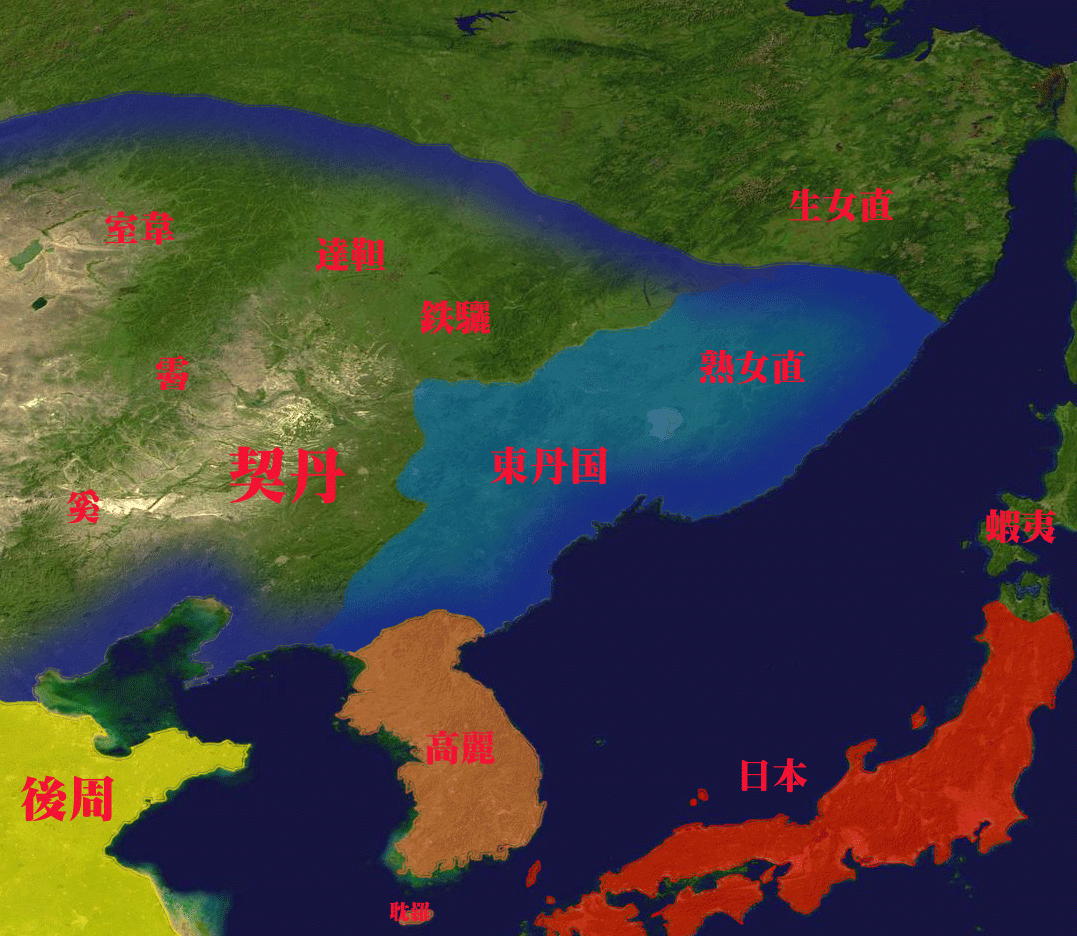
Map of the Dongdan in light blue, including the Primorye.

After Balhae's defeat in 926, the Liao dynasty established the puppet state of Dongdan, ruled by Yelü Bei, the son of the Liao emperor. However, Bei was soon forced to flee after his brother Yelü Deguang ascended to the Liao throne. On the advice of the Later Tang emperor Mingzong, Bei sought refuge with the Later Tang dynasty. Although Dongdan continued to exist on paper for some time, it was ultimately absorbed into the Liao state in either 936 or 982, depending on different perspectives.

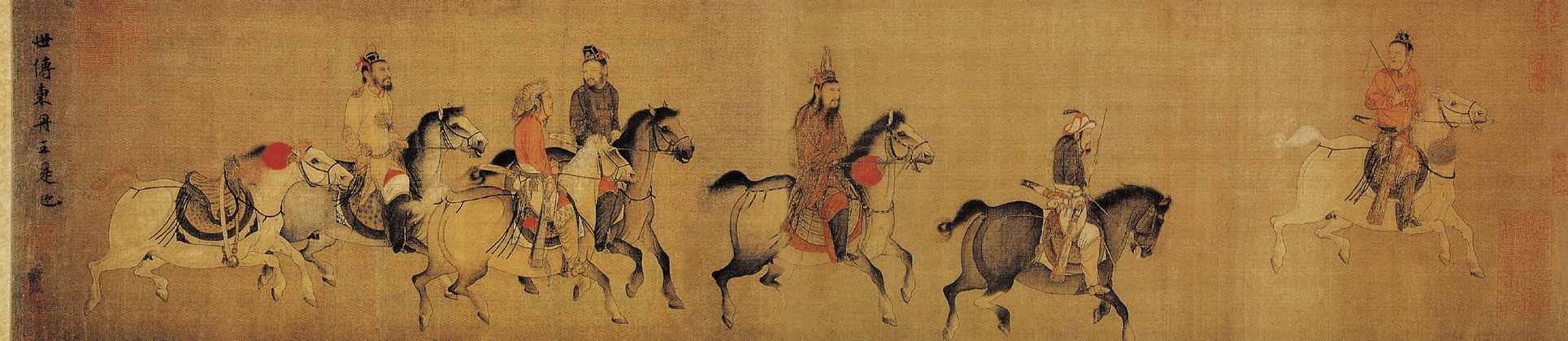
The King of Dongdan goes forth (東丹王出行圖), scroll, light colors on silk. 146.8 × 77.3 cm. National Palace Museum, Taipei. Attributed to Li Zanhua (李贊華 909–946), but it may be a later artist.

Many Balhae people refused to accept their defeat, and uprisings erupted throughout the former kingdom. The first major revolt occurred in 929 when members of the former royal family declared the Later Balhae kingdom, but this rebellion was suppressed, followed by another failed uprising in 934. The Liao dynasty deliberately relocated Balhae populations to prevent further uprisings. In 938, rebels established the short-lived kingdom of Ding'an, but in 946, the eruption of Mount Paektu led to mass displacement, further weakening Balhae resistance. That same year, the Khitan emperor issued a decree forcing Balhae inhabitants to move into Liao-controlled territory, causing the region to lose about two-thirds of its population. As the territory became increasingly depopulated and marginalized, Liao authorities took steps to prevent future rebellions, including co-opting Balhae officials. Another Balhae uprising broke out in 975 but was unsuccessful. In 982, Dongdan was officially annexed, and the remaining Balhae people sought alliances with the Jurchens, descendants of the Mohe, including the Heishui Mohe. In 983, Liao forces partially conquered Ding'an, though rebel groups continued to resist in the mountainous regions. By 985, the Khitans had completely crushed Ding'an. Some survivors managed to forge alliances with both the Jurchens and the Song dynasty Chinese. However, the Liao emerged victorious once again, launching a new campaign from 988 to 989 in which they burned villages, looted settlements, and massacred inhabitants. A final military expedition in 990 definitively established Liao control over the region.

The Jurchens then became the dominant population in Primorye, potentially descending from the Heishui Mohe. While the Jurchen name appeared in Khitan chronicles, the term "Heishui Mohe" never did, suggesting a shift in nomenclature that occurred during the 9th century. By the 11th century, the name Heishui had completely disappeared. Additionally, the Jurchens likely included smaller numbers of Balhae remnants and other local ethnic groups. In 991, an alliance of 30 tribal groups from southern Primorye and northern Korea rebelled but was swiftly crushed by the Khitans.

===== Revolts in Primorye (11th–12th centuries) =====
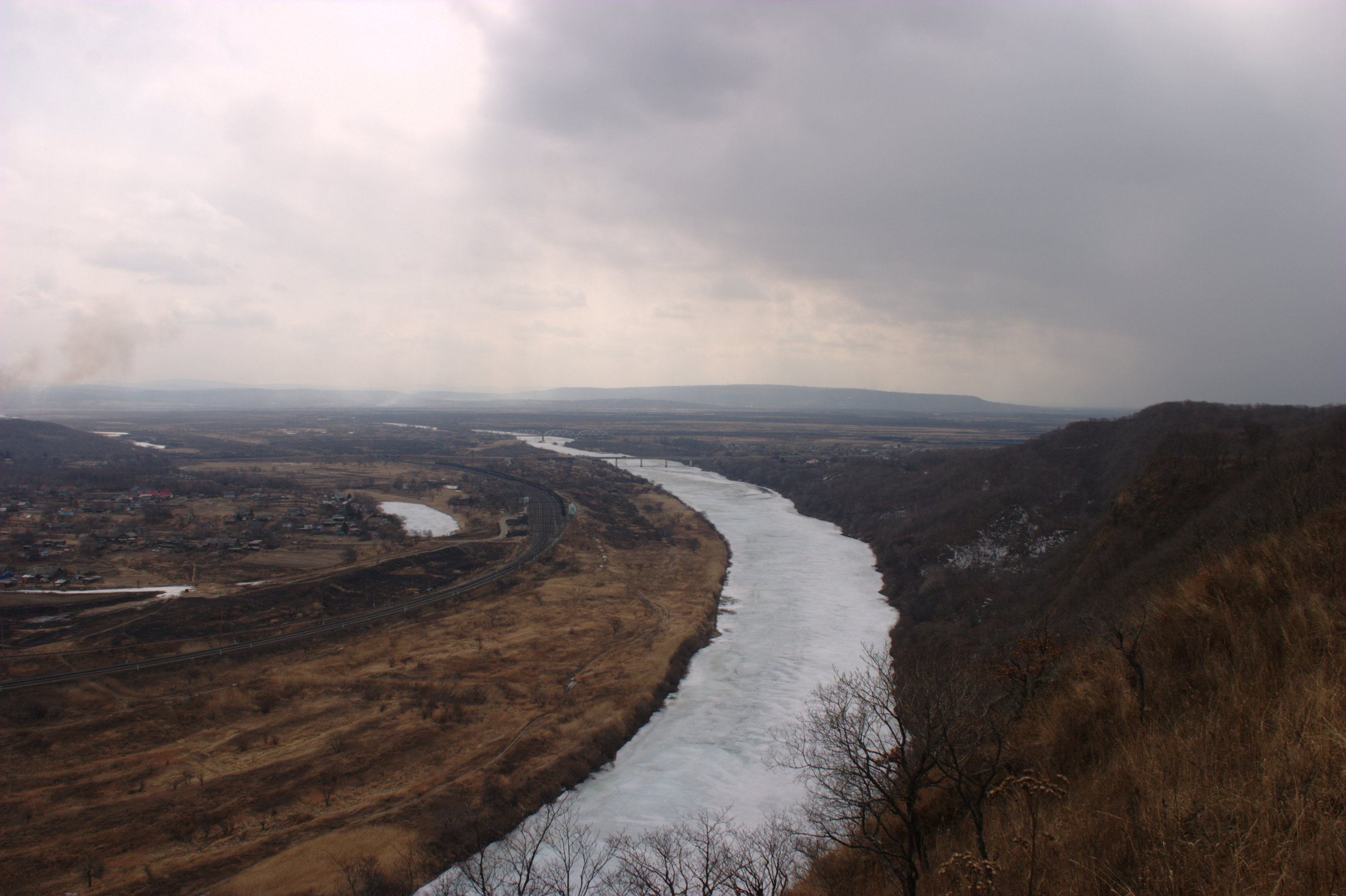
Suifen Valley from the Baranovski Volcano.

The Jurchens living in Primorye at this time were mostly rebels. One clan in the region, the Wanyan clan, sought to unite the various Jurchen tribes, with their leader holding the title "wanyan." However, other tribes resisted their efforts. Between 1010 and 1021, Wanyan Shilu (完颜石鲁) led the conquest of the Suifen and Yelan tribes, (Note: The Yelan tribes primarily lived in the basins of the Arsenievka and Partizanskaya rivers.) exploiting their internal divisions. His son, Wanyan Wugunai (完颜乌骨迺), was more lenient toward the other tribes, but his successor, Wanyan Helibo (完颜劾里钵), ruled with a firmer hand, provoking a coastal tribal revolt. The Yelan tribe eventually crushed this rebellion. During the reign of Wanyan Yingge (完颜盈歌, 1094–1103), the Wanyan clan attempted to integrate non-Wanyan tribal leaders into positions of authority. However, one such appointee, Haigean, the leader of the Wazhun tribe, rebelled. Haigean seized control of the Suifen and Tumen rivers, as well as part of the Khanka plain. (Note: Refers to the southern part of Lake Khanka.) He became the dominant power in the agricultural regions of Primorye and captured two former Balhae fortresses.

Yingge sent the chief Nagenne to suppress Haigean, but Nagenne also rebels for his gain. He subdues various tribes (except Haigean, who is too strong), prompting these tribes to complain to Yingge. By the time the complaints reach him, the region is under the control of two rebellious leaders, who have formed a tribal alliance in opposition to Liao rule. Yingge then dispatches two military leaders, Vasai and Yeha, to "investigate the complaints." After several battles, Nagenne is killed, and Vasai conquers the lands of the Suifen tribes. The Wanyan clan now controls these territories, though discontent persists among the Suifen tribes.

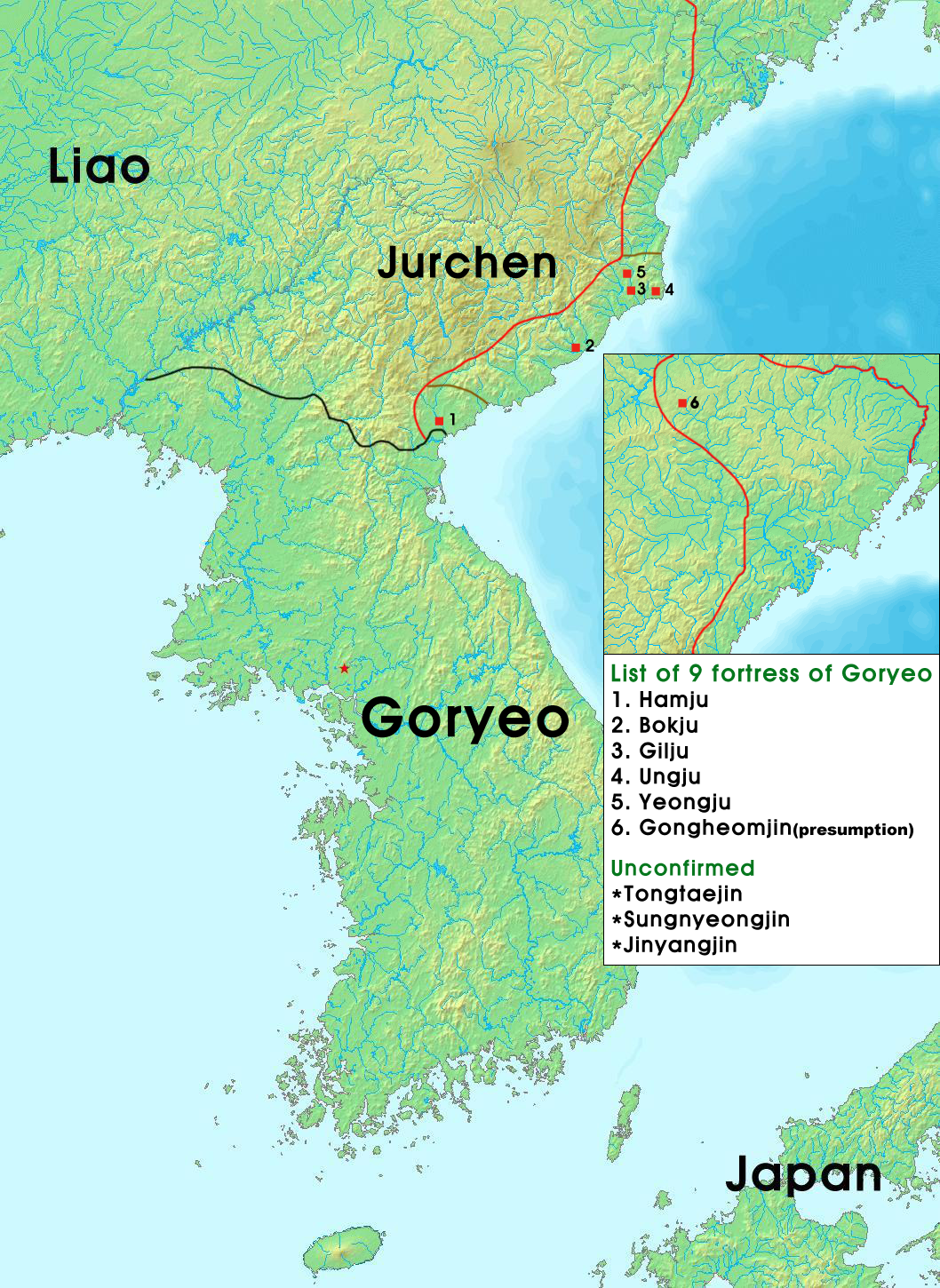
Map of Korea in 1108, with the confirmed locations of the forts, one of which is in the Khassan district. We can see the border caused by the arrival of the rebels.

Still seeking independence, the Suifen tribes form a tribal alliance with the Yelan and Heshile tribes. This alliance, named the Asu Coalition after the Heshile leader, aims to defeat both the Wazhun and the Wanyan. It successfully unites 35 tribes, including 14 from the Suifen. However, despite the coalition's growing strength, Wanyan general Aguda takes advantage of internal divisions and a strategic mistake by Dong'en (Note: Also known as Dunen or Dong Neng.) (one of the coalition commanders and the son of Nagenne, but on the opposing side). Instead of aiding Luke, a fellow general and leader of the Wugulun tribe, Dong'en attacks a minor chief. As a result, the coalition forces are destroyed. In 1102, Asu, the leader, flees into Liao-controlled territory in an attempt to incite another rebellion among the Yelan and Suifen, but he fails.

Asu and many other rebels take refuge in the northern part of the Goryeo kingdom. However, Goryeo is displeased with their arrival and negotiates with the Wanyan to have them taken back. When the Wanyan do not respond, Goryeo launches a war against them but is ultimately defeated, while Asu remains uninvolved in the conflict. Wuyashu (完顏烏雅束), the Wanyan leader from 1103 to 1113, attempts to resolve the conflict with the coalition through diplomacy, but without success, and the battles continue. In 1107, taking advantage of the ongoing chaos, Goryeo sent 170,000 troops into northern Korea and southern Primorye to conquer the region. The Jurchens, both from the coalition and the Wanyan side, suffer defeats, and Korea constructs fortresses in the area. However, in 1109, most of the Jurchens, fearing an attack from the Khitans due to their weakened state, regrouped and launched a counterattack against Goryeo, the Suifen, and the Yelan. The remaining Mohe, still present in small numbers, join the Jurchens, which helps them defeat Goryeo. Goryeo ultimately sues for peace. Primorye is returned to the Jurchens, a new boundary is established between the Jurchens and Koreans, and the Yelan, Suifen, and other tribal leaders align themselves with the Wanyan following their victory over Goryeo.

==== Jin Dynasty ====
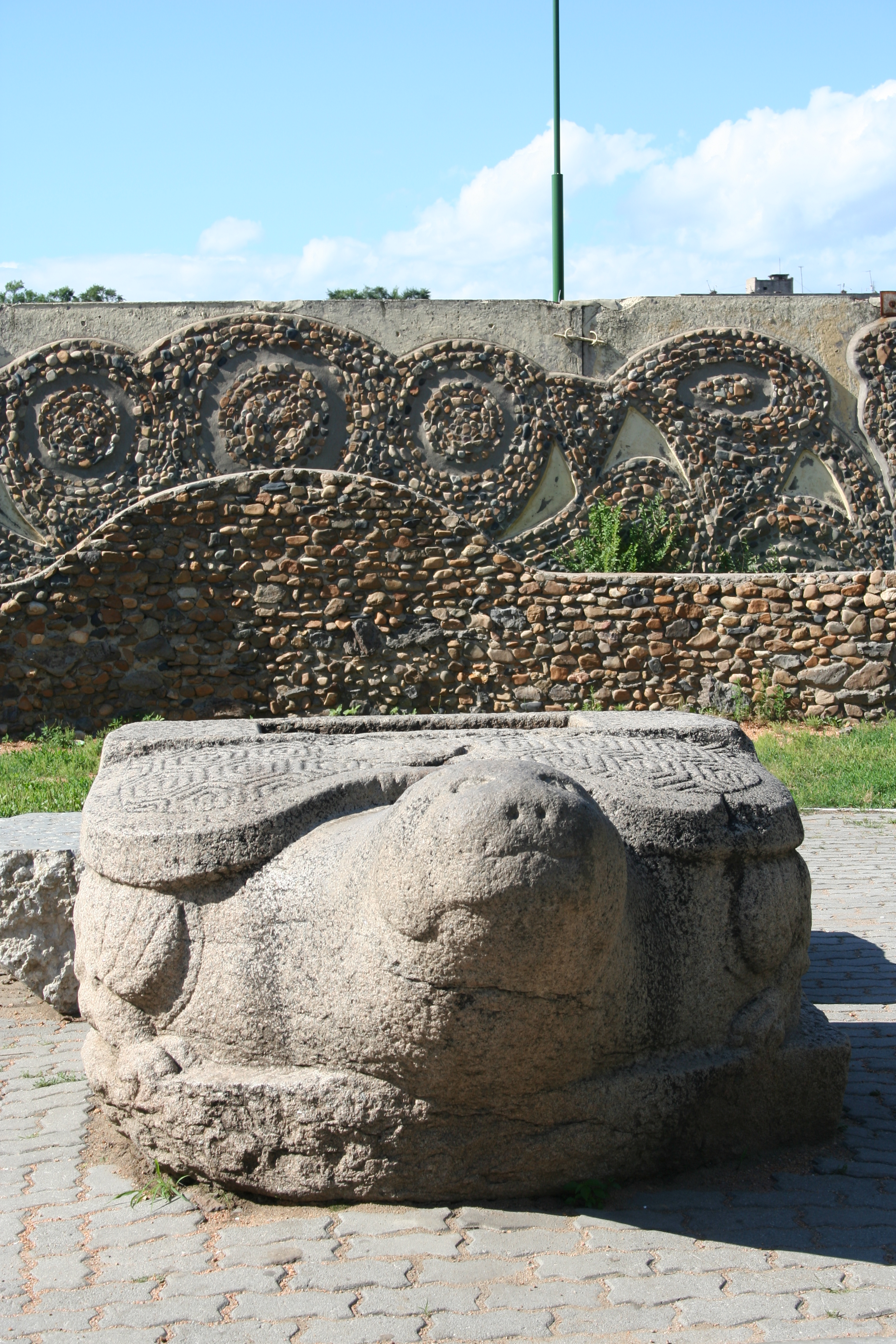
A dragon-turtle from the tomb of Esykuy, currently located in the central park of the city of Ussuriisk.

After the unification of the Jurchen tribes by the Wanyan clan during the war against Goryeo, Aguda, a Jurchen leader, defies the Liao emperor in 1112 by refusing to attend a ceremonial dance. In September 1114, Ningjiangzhou is captured by Aguda, the leader of the Wanyan clan, effectively initiating his rebellion. The following January, he proclaims himself emperor, founding the Jin Dynasty. From 1115 to 1121, the Song Dynasty views the Jin as a natural ally against the Liao and formalizes the "Alliance Concluded at Sea." However, in 1125, the Jin break the alliance upon realizing the Song's weakness. The Jin Dynasty now rules over northern China and Primorye. Meanwhile, Aguda (now known as Jin Taizu) invites Asu to return to his lands in 1115 to prevent the Suifen and Yelan tribes from rebelling while he wages war against the Khitans.

In 1122, Esykuy (also known as Yesykui, Digunai, or Wanyan Zhong), a military leader, moves his headquarters to Xuiping. In 1124, accompanied by a thousand soldiers, he launches operations in the region to suppress rebellions while Jin Taizu stations troops in Primorye. Esykuy establishes his headquarters near Suibing, (Note: The various names Xuping, Suiping, Suibing, Suibin all originate from Shuiabin, the name used during the Balhae era for this region.) preferring not to displace local inhabitants to avoid provoking further revolts. His headquarters eventually grows into a small town on a hill, named Xuping in Chinese, which becomes the capital of the province of the same name, with Esykuy as its governor. Until his death, Esykuy focuses on reconstructing and fortifying former Balhae fortresses, including Syupin (a colony in southern Ussuri), Chite-Syupin (a western Ussuri colony), Krasnoyarovskoye (Golden Valley), and Nikolayevskoye on the Suchan River. Esykuy died in 1148, and it was not until 1193 that a mausoleum was built in his honor. During his rule, he strengthened central authority over nearly all of Primorye and fostered the local economy. For the remainder of the Jin Dynasty, Primorye remained a peaceful and remote peripheral region.

Under the Jin Dynasty, the Jurchens engaged in cattle and horse breeding (hunting being economically insignificant), high-quality pottery production on an industrial scale for a broad market, as well as the production of wood, leather, and even artillery shells. Although predating the Jin era, kang heating systems become widespread, persisting among the indigenous peoples of the Far East until the early 20th century. Decorative arts and fine arts flourish in Primorye and among the Jurchens, as evidenced by bronze figurines. Buddhism spreads in Primorye and among the Jurchens, with the discovery of a Buddhist monastery at the Nikolaevskoye site.

The present-day Primorye region was covered by several administrative divisions (districts/circuits) of the Jin Dynasty: Helan, Huilgai, Xuipin, and Yelan.

==== Eastern Xia ====
In 1210, a Jin delegation arrived at the court of Genghis Khan to announce the ascension of Jin Weishaowang to the throne and to demand that the Mongols submit as a vassal state to the Jin Dynasty. The Mongols refuse, and the following year, they launch their invasion of the Jin Dynasty. The Jin gradually lost territory, and in 1212, the Mongols capture Mukden, one of the empire's capitals.

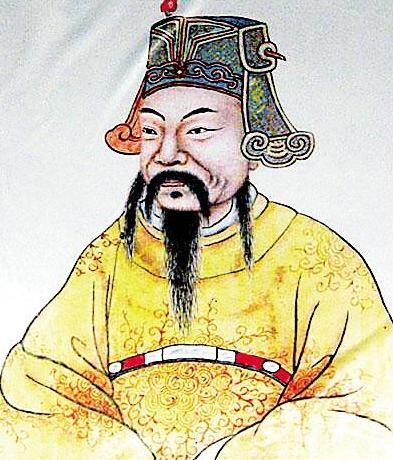
Illustration by Puxian Wannu.

In 1215, Puxian Wannu, a general of the Jin emperor, took advantage of growing distrust among the military and rebels. He established the Eastern Jin Kingdom (also called Dongzhen) in the easternmost territories of the empire, including Primorye and parts of Heilongjiang and Jilin, with its capital at Liaoyang. However, later that same year, the Mongols capture the Jin Dynasty's capital and seize some of Wannu's close associates. In response, Wannu marches with an army of 100,000 men (Note: Does not include their families.) toward Kaiyuan, (Note: The eastern capital of this empire was located in the present-day urban district of Ussuriysk, near the modern city.) where he proclaims the Eastern Xia Kingdom. To avoid Mongol conquest, Wannu declares himself a vassal of Genghis Khan and sends his son as a hostage. At the same time, he allies with the Koreans to counter the Khitan invasion. However, since the Khitans are Mongol allies, this alliance signals potential disaster. Meanwhile, Eastern Xia maintains diplomatic and trade relations with Goryeo while keeping the peace with the Mongols. Wannu also suppresses revolts by rebellious Khitans in Mongol-held lands.

In 1230, the Mongols, fed up with Eastern Xia, particularly with its emperor Ningyasu (who had ruled since 1224 and led raids against them), launch a campaign to conquer the kingdom. With Goryeo's permission to pass through its territory, the Mongol forces reach and besiege Kaiyuan and Yanji, the capitals of the Eastern Xia Empire, capturing them in 1233. In Yanji, the southern capital, Puxian Wannu and Ningyasu are captured, along with the entire royal family. By 1235, the last Jurchen holdouts in fortresses across Primorye are subdued by the Mongols.

Despite the brief occupation, many Jurchens migrate to Primorye, bringing advanced techniques to local Jurchen communities. During this period, the region became heavily fortified, with around 40 fortresses built. However, following the collapse of Eastern Xia, devastation became the norm, with villages and fortresses abandoned and livestock released into the wild. Many Jurchens retreat into the taiga, cutting off all contact with the outside world.

=== Primorye under Mongol rule ===
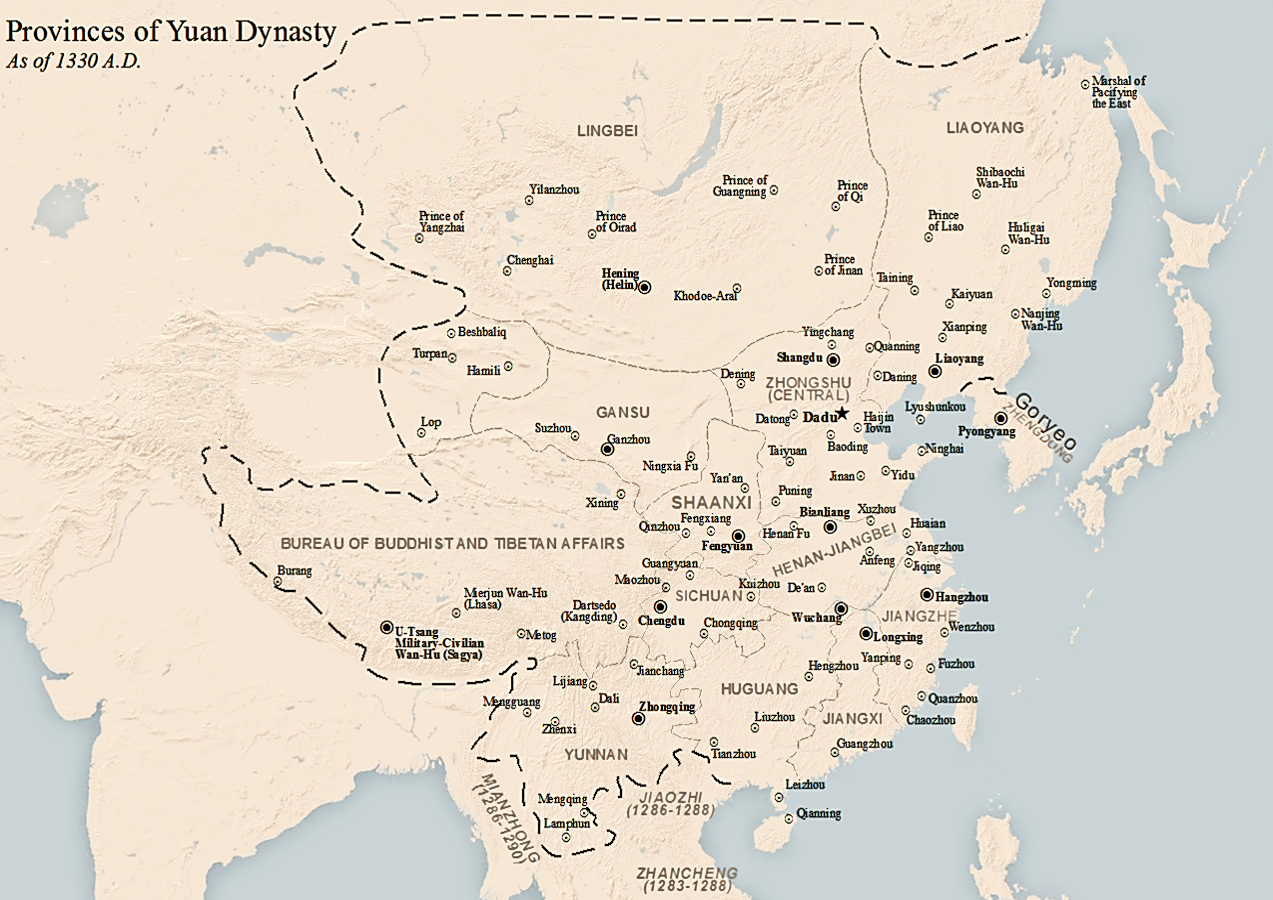
Provinces of the Yuan dynasty in 1330.

The Mongol Empire took control of the region and incorporated it into Liaoyang province. In 1235, the empire established garrisons in Yanji and Kaiyuan. A revolt erupts in 1245 but is quickly crushed. For the next 40 years, resistant Jurchens attempted in vain to expel the Mongols.

In 1261, Kublai Khan created ten administrative divisions in the newly established Kaiyuan region to pacify it. However, in May 1263, the region and its administrative divisions were abolished. In March 1266, the Kaiyuan region was reestablished, and in 1271, Kublai Khan founded the Yuan Dynasty. In November 1280, the region was affected when 3,000 soldiers were recruited from Kaiyuan to participate in the second Mongol invasion of Japan. Then, in March 1286, the Kaiyuan region was once again dissolved.

The area becomes increasingly isolated, sparsely populated, and almost devoid of civilization. The Yuan Dynasty's policies lead to a "brain drain," with many skilled individuals leaving the region, while the Mongols continue to recruit soldiers from the area and send them elsewhere. Resistant Jurchens regroup into small communities. The Mongols, rather than impose strict control, allowed these communities to elect their leaders, providing a degree of autonomy as a compromise to prevent rebellion. In 1368, the Ming Dynasty overthrew the Yuan Dynasty in China. However, Mongol rule persists in Manchuria. In 1387, the Ming launched a military campaign in Manchuria, successfully bringing the region, including present-day Primorye, under their control.

=== Under the Ming Dynasty ===
==== A multitude of tribes ====
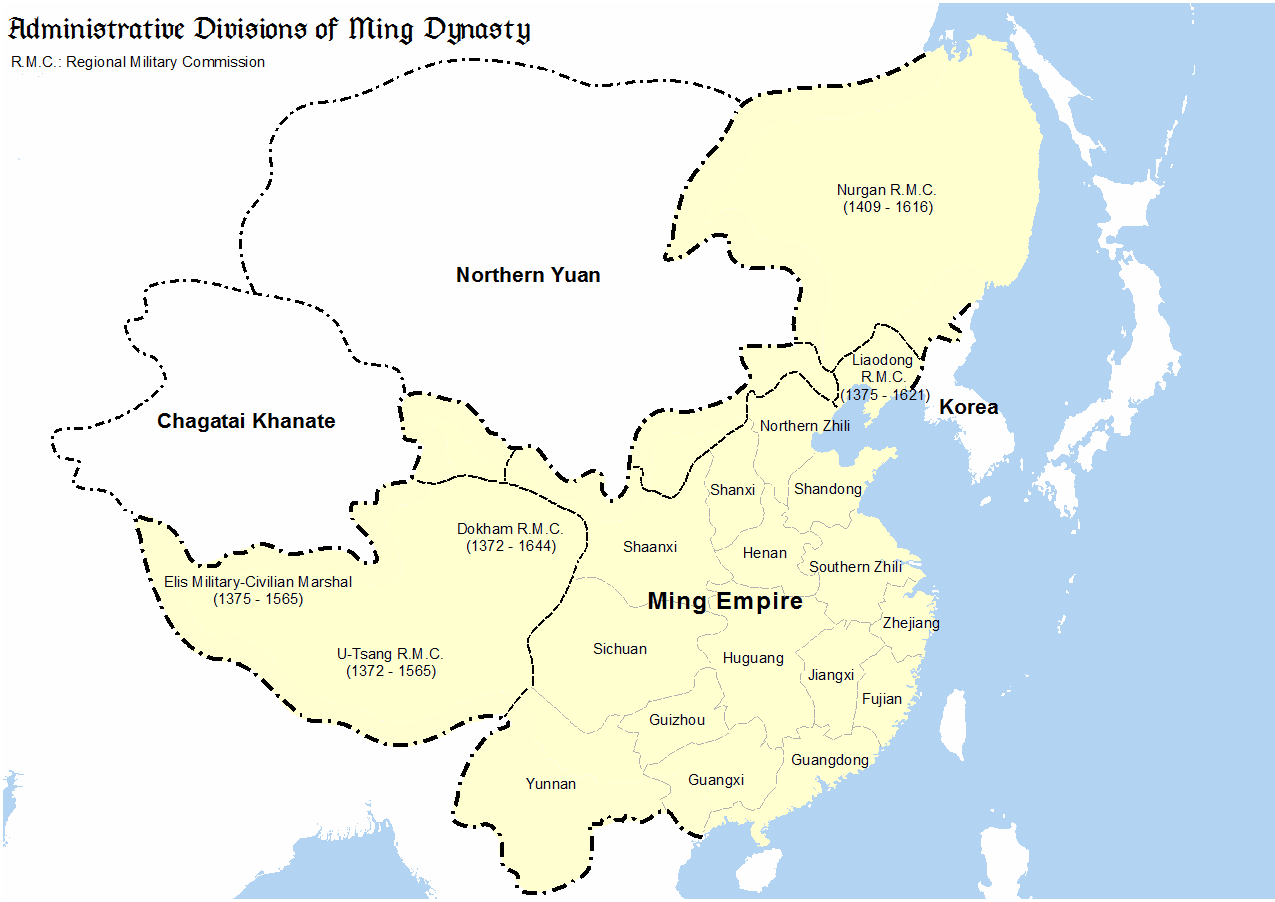
Provinces of the Ming dynasty in 1409

After the fall of this Mongol state, numerous small and weak clans and tribes scattered throughout the region sought to unite. Others sought protection from China or Korea, which aimed to subjugate the last Jürchens. These local populations were semi-nomadic, engaged in agriculture and trade, and frequently fought among themselves. Many tribal leaders sent embassies to the Ming dynasty, securing peace with the Chinese.

Between 1404 and 1434, the Ming dynasty sought to extend its influence. In 1409, it established the Nurgan Regional Military Commission to oversee Manchuria. The commission aimed to spread Buddhism, while Jürchen tribal leaders were appointed as members to ensure their loyalty. Despite the commission's existence, the region remained largely independent, as the central authority had no interest in imposing strong control. In 1491, the fortress of Ts Zaoshan (Note: Near the present-day town of Khasan.) was attacked by the Jürchen "Nimache" tribe, who captured people and livestock. They were pursued by Chinese troops, and the tribe's leader was killed a few days later.

The Ming classified the Jürchens into three groups: the Jianzhou Jürchens, the Haixi Jürchens, and the Haidong Jürchens (also called "wild" Jürchens). The Jianzhou Jürchens consisted of three tribes: the Odoli, Huligai, and Tuowen. The Haixi Jürchens were controlled by the Hūlun Alliance, a tribal confederation composed of the Ula, Hada, Hoifa, and Yehe tribes. Little is known about the "wild" Jürchens, except that they included the Donghai, Warka, Woji, and Khurkha tribes.

==== Unification of the Jürchens in Primorye ====
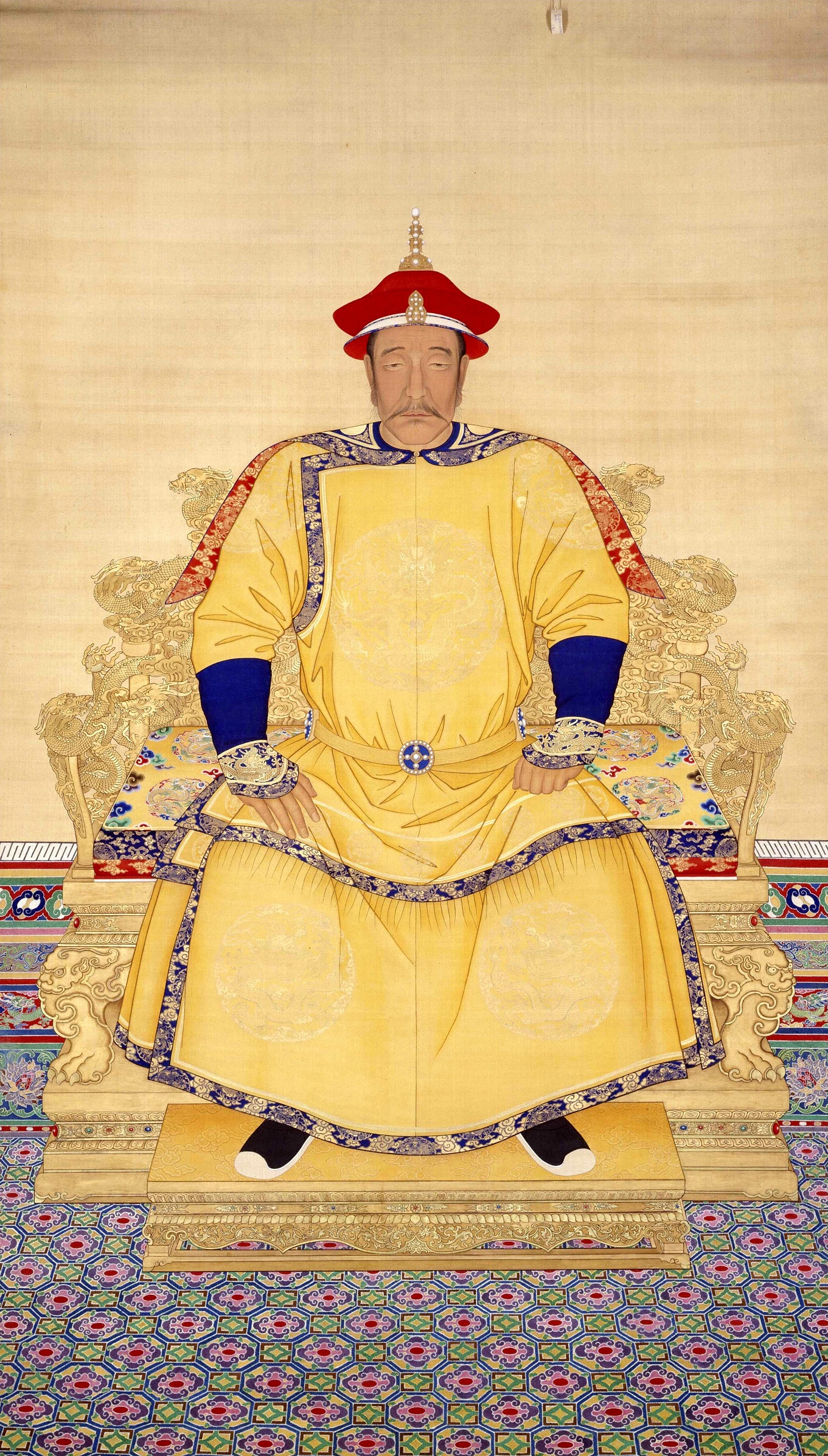
Official portrait of Nurhachi.

Nurhaci, the leader of the Jianzhou Jürchens, began uniting the Jürchens in 1582. His successes in Manchuria led to the gradual unification of the Jürchens, but Primorye, home to the "wild" tribes, proved more difficult. In 1593, nine tribes, mostly from Haixi, allied against him, but he crushed their coalition. Strengthened by this victory, he turned his attention to conquering the "wild" tribes.

In 1607, under Nurhaci's orders, Prince Bayala, high-ranking commander Eidu, and adjutant Khurhan led 1,000 men against the Woji tribes. Two years later, in 1609, a detachment of 1,000 soldiers led by Khurhan invaded the Huenote district, (Note: Basin of the Daubihe (Arsenievka) River.) capturing 2,000 families and transporting them to Manchuria.

In 1610, the Manchu general Eidu arrived in the Suifen Valley with 1,000 soldiers. He invited the Voji/Woji tribe, who lived in southern Primorye from Suifen to the Partizanskaya River, to join Nurhaci. They refused, and Eidu conquered the region militarily, capturing over 10,000 people in Yelan district (also known as Ye Yelan or Yalan, located in the Partizanskaya River basin).

In 1614, 200 families who had laid down their arms and another 1,000 captives were taken to Manchuria from the districts of Yalan (Suchan River) and Xilin (the eastern shore of Ussuri Bay). In 1615, the Eight Banners launched a campaign against the tribes of Primorye, killing 800 people and capturing 10,000 individuals across 500 families. Finally, in 1616, Nurhaci proclaimed the Later Jin dynasty after unifying the Jürchens, and two years later, he waged war against the Ming dynasty. On February 8, 1635, the troops of Ubahai and Jingurdai clashed with the Warka tribes, attacking the Nimanya region (Iman River) and capturing more than 1,000 people.

On November 15, 1635 (November 25 in the Gregorian calendar), the Manchu troops attacked southern Primorye to conquer the region once and for all, deploying four columns of soldiers to different locations. The first, under the command of Ubahai, settled in Eheikulun and Eleyuso; the second, led by Dojili, moved toward Yalan (now the Partizanskaya River), Lilin, and Hue (modern Daubi-He and Suchan Rivers); the third, commanded by Zhafuni, advanced toward Akuli and Niman (now the Vaku and Iman Rivers); and the fourth, under Ushit's command, went to Noley and Avan. The captured Indigenous people were organized into five special companies (nyuru), two of which comprised inhabitants from the Suifen River basin, while the remaining three included Indigenous people from the Iman River basin.

=== Qing Dynasty ===
In 1644, Beijing fell to the Manchus, and the newly established Qing dynasty ruled over China, including Manchuria. During the early reign of Emperor Kangxi, he encouraged the settlement of Primorye's tribes in Manchuria or their integration as Qing subjects. To achieve this, he created incentives with honorary distinctions for those who successfully brought in these tribes, either through peaceful means or military campaigns. This policy led to multiple Manchu military expeditions in the region, prompting the Jürchens to request an end to hostilities. Cities were attacked, forcing the Jürchens to flee into the taiga or the mountains, abandoning agriculture and craftsmanship in favor of a return to hunting, gathering, and fishing.

Additionally, with the arrival of Siberian Cossacks in the Upper Amur region (present-day Amur Oblast and Transbaikal), indigenous populations from that area migrated into Primorye.

==== Primorye in Chinese sources ====
The Historical and Geographical Description of the Daiqing Dynasty states that Primorye was known at the time as "Woji" and was inhabited by the Donghai-Wojibu, meaning "forest tribes of the Eastern Sea." According to the Map of Jilin Province, camps of the Kya-ka-la tribe were located on the southern bank of the Xise River. (Note: Today known as Djiguitovka, and until 1971 called Yodzi-He. It flows into the sea near Plastun.) This Tungusic-speaking tribe was generally spread from present-day Vladivostok to the Xise River. However, Japanese scholar Sei Wada disputed this, arguing that the tribe was primarily located in the upper reaches of the Iman River. According to Wada, this tribe consisted of the present-day Orochs and Udege of the Sikhote-Alin, previously classified as "wild Jürchens" under the Yuan dynasty. Additionally, both Chinese and Russian sources mention the Tungusic-speaking Varka tribe, which extended from the Tumen River basin to the upper Ussuri River and inhabited the coastline, including the nearby islands.

All modern studies agree that since the Mongol invasion of the 13th century, two major Tungusic-speaking ethnic associations (or tribal unions) existed on the western and eastern slopes of the Sikhote-Alin: the Woji and the Varka (Warka), who are the ancestors of the Nanai, Udege, and Orochs. In addition to the Tungusic-Manchu peoples, there were also other groups, including the Nivkh and Ainu peoples.

==== The "dark period" caused by Kangxi and the Qing Dynasty ====
Despite these historical developments, Emperor Kangxi (1662–1722) took the most aggressive actions against the tribes of Primorye. He implemented reward systems to encourage his generals to organize military campaigns. An imperial record states: "During the early years of Emperor Kangxi's reign, according to the most frequently submitted reports, it was permitted to grant rewards to participants in campaigns aimed at 'bringing into citizenship' the new Manchus in the following order: for 100 families brought in, a first-degree distinction; for 80 families, a second-degree military distinction; for 60 families, a third-degree military distinction; for 40 families, a fourth-degree military distinction; and for 20 families, a fifth-degree military distinction."

These actions inevitably forced the Tungusic and Manchu tribes to relocate to more inaccessible areas, particularly northern Primorye and the Amur River region. These displacements had become a traditional response of these tribes to external threats. This trait is still observed among the Nanai people today; although they are now sedentary, they have historically not maintained a single place of residence. Distance posed no issue for these tribes, as they could travel from the Ussuri to the Arsenievka and from the Arsenievka to the Amur, abandoning their fanza (traditional dwellings) each time.

This marked the beginning of the "dark period" in Primorye during the 16th and 17th centuries. While Primorye was not entirely uninhabited—its Tungusic-Manchu population, including the Woji and Warka tribes, was significant—they were often driven from their lands.

==== Administrative division under the Qing Dynasty ====
Administratively, present-day Primorye was divided into the Qing dynasty districts (counties) of Helinlu, Yalanlu, Suifenlu, Huelu, and Nimachalu. The Helinlu district included the eastern coast of Ussuri Bay, encompassing today's Shkotovo District, from the Maihe River to Vostok Bay. The basins of the Suchan and Suzuhe Rivers, stretching from the southern foothills of the Sikhote-Alin Range to the sea, formed the Yalanlu district. The Suifenlu district was located in the Suifen River basin and adjacent territory. Huelu district covered the basins of the Daubi-He and Ulakhe Rivers, while Nimachalu district included the Iman River and its surroundings.

==== Russian and European explorations ====
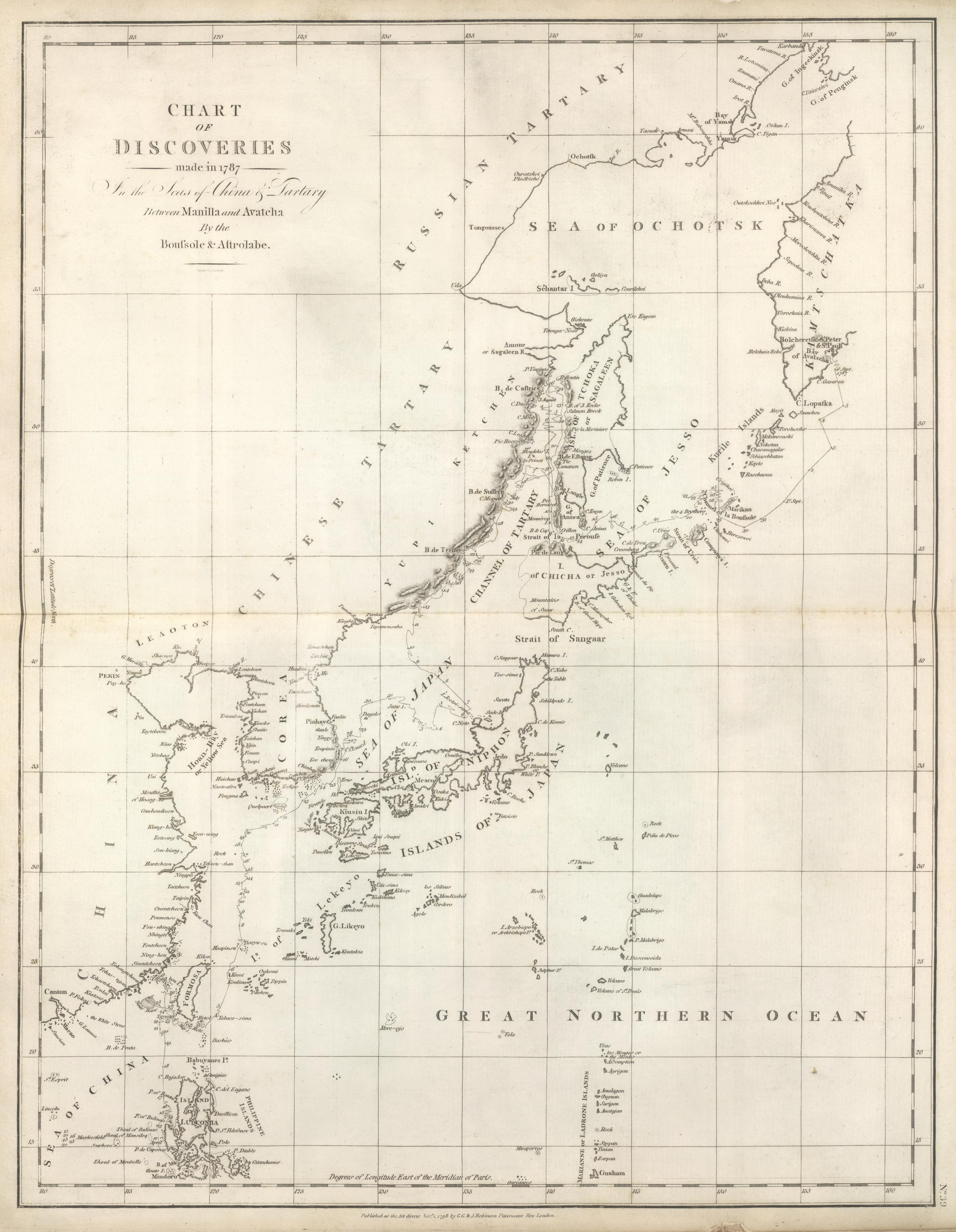
Map of the discoveries of La Pérouse, with the Primorsky coast.

While Primorye was under Ming and later Qing rule, the Russian Tsardom began its conquest of Siberia, starting with the Khanate of Sibir in 1581. In 1636, Dmitry Epifanovich Kopylov departed from Yakutsk, which had been founded in 1632, and reached the Sea of Okhotsk in May 1638, where the settlement of Okhotsk was later established in 1647 by Ivan Moskvitin. Moskvitin learned from the Nivkh people about the existence of the Amur River but did not attempt to explore it. Between 1643 and 1646, Vasily Poyarkov explored the Amur River, providing detailed reports that prompted further expeditions, one of which reached Lake Beloïe, now known as Lake Khanka—the first recorded Russian presence in Primorye. Following the Sino-Russian border conflicts, in which the Qing emerged victorious, China retained control of the Amur region and Primorye, forcing the Russians to withdraw.

In 1787, during his global expedition, French explorer Jean-François de La Pérouse mapped the Russian Far East, including Primorye. On June 23, he anchored in a bay he named Ternay Bay, after his mentor Charles-Henri-Louis d'Arsac de Ternay. Today, this is Terneï Bay, along with the village of the same name. Between 1793 and 1796, British explorer William Robert Broughton retraced La Pérouse's route.

== Russian era ==
=== The Russian Empire's arrival in Primorye (pre-revolutionary period) ===
==== Annexation and colonization of Primorye ====
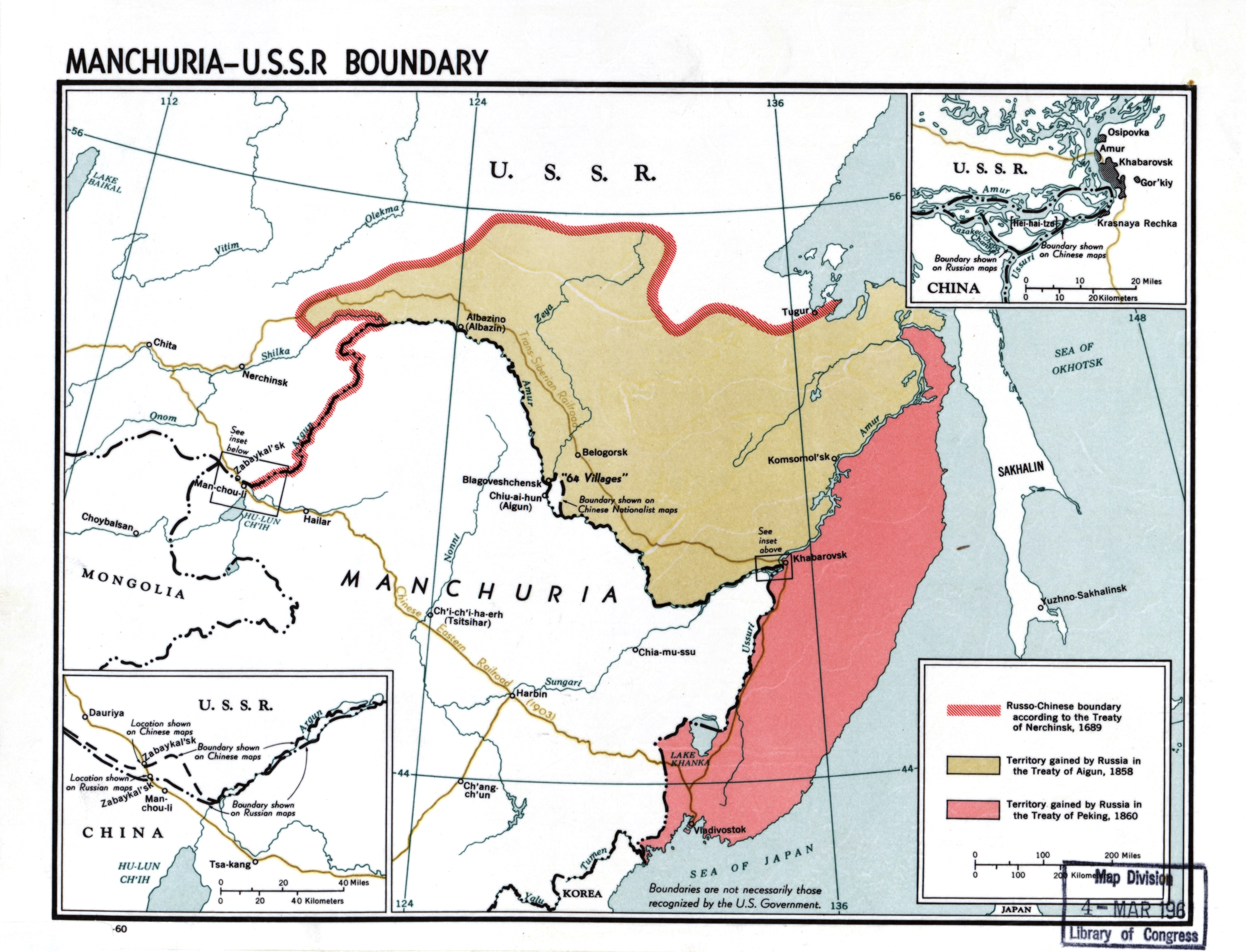
Sino-Russian borders from 1858 to 1860

The colonization of Primorye by Siberian Cossacks began in the 1850s with the establishment of Nikolaevsk-on-Amur in 1850, the first Russian settlement in the southern Russian Far East, now part of Khabarovsk Krai.

In 1856, the Primorskaya Oblast was officially founded, with Nikolaevsk as its capital. On May 16, 1858, the Qing dynasty and the Russian Empire signed the Treaty of Aigun—an unequal treaty that granted Russia all the land north of the Amur River. These new territories were integrated into Primorye Oblast, and on May 31, the settlement of Khabarovsk was established, despite being on the southern bank of the Amur. By 1859, military outposts had been set up across Primorye, including one at Turii Rog on the shores of Lake Khanka and another in Olga Bay. That same year, the expedition of Nikolay Muravyov-Amursky, which explored the northwestern coast of the Sea of Japan, identified a strategic location for the founding of Vladivostok. In 1860, Russian soldiers established additional outposts in Razdolnoye and Uglovoye, and on June 20, 1860, they founded the Vladivostok military post on the Golden Horn Bay, purely for strategic purposes.

On November 2, 1860, the Convention of Peking was signed—another unequal treaty that allowed for the annexation of all of Outer Manchuria, including the lands of Primorye. However, the Chinese population was permitted to remain in these territories. The Cossacks, particularly those from the Amur region, were tasked with developing and protecting the area. They established the region's first villages as early as 1859, including Verkhne-Mikhailovka (now Mikhailovka) and others. Between 1855 and 1862, a total of 29 Russian villages were founded along the Ussuri River. In 1866, the village of Nikolskoe was founded by peasant migrants from the Astrakhan and Voronezh governorates, unknowingly built on the site of an ancient medieval city (Shuiabin/Xuping).

In 1868, the Manzu War erupted due to legal ambiguities arising from the Treaty of Aigun. Under this treaty, the "Manzu"—Chinese populations now living in Russian-controlled territory—retained Chinese citizenship and remained under Chinese administrative control, despite residing in the Russian Empire. Taking advantage of this legal gray area, Chinese bandit clans known as the Honghuzi began infiltrating the region and attacking Russian settlers. Battles and skirmishes occurred mainly between April and July 1868, though clashes continued afterward.

==== Large-Scale migration from Europe (1860–1900) ====
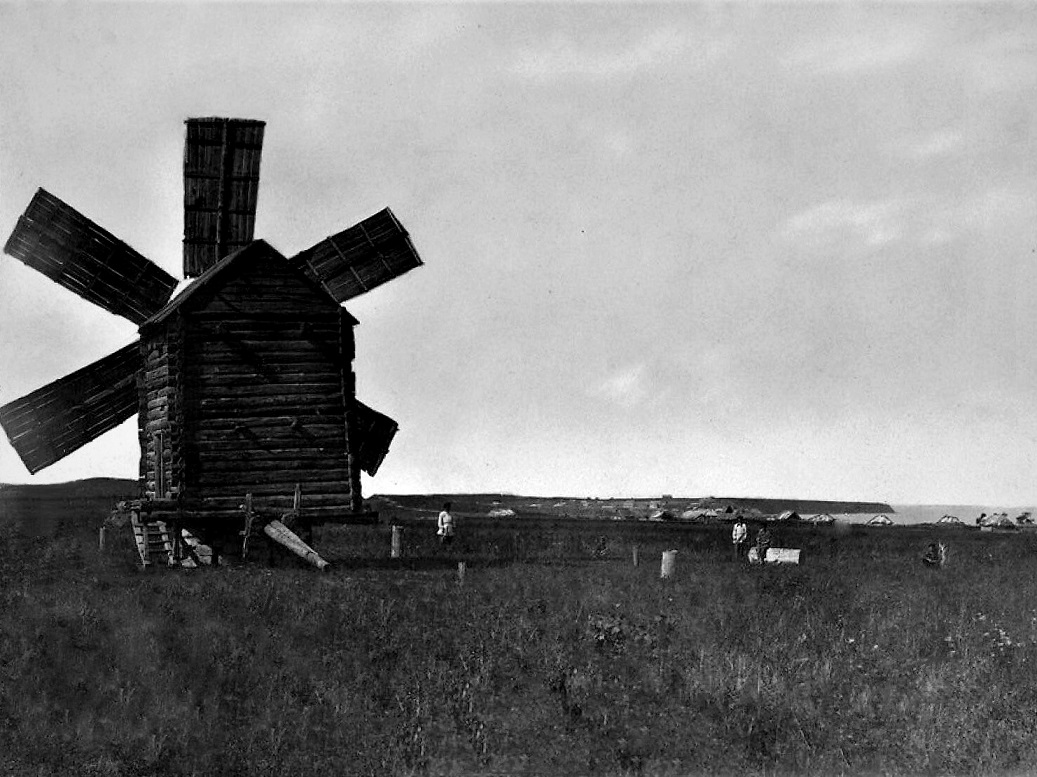
Mill at Astrakhanovka near Lake Khanka in the 1870s, Vladimir Lanine.

After the abolition of serfdom in Russia in early 1860, on March 26, 1861, the government declared the colonization of the Amur and Primorye regions open to "landless peasants and enterprising people of all classes who wish to relocate at their own expense." However, these peasants were required to pay off their arrears before emigrating—that is, the sum they owed to their former landowners. To attract settlers, the government provided each family within a migrating community (as long as the community had at least 15 families) with a free plot of land of up to 100 acres, exempt from taxes or duties for 20 years. They were also freed from conscription for 10 years, while trade remained untaxed, further encouraging an influx of peasants. With only minor modifications, these rules remained in effect until 1900. The following year, the village of Vetka was founded under the name Foudine in what is now the Olga District. Between 1861 and 1881, approximately 51.8% of the migrants settling in Primorye came from the governorates of Astrakhan, Voronezh, and Vyatka.

By 1862, there were already 14,000 Cossacks living along the banks of the Amur and Ussuri rivers, with 29 villages established in the Ussuri basin. In 1863, the settlement of Voronezhskaya was founded at the site of the former Turii Rog military post, and in 1864, Vladimiro-Alexandrovskoye was established. In 1866, Ussuriysk—originally named Nikolskoe—was founded near the Suifen River, along with Astrakhanka and Razdolnoe. Migrants used different modes of transportation depending on the time period. Between 1861 and 1881, land routes were the primary means of travel. From 1881 to 1901, maritime transport became dominant, and from 1902 to 1917, the railway became the preferred mode of migration. In 1881, a steamship route between Odessa and Vladivostok was inaugurated, requiring a two-month voyage. By 1879, as the plains became increasingly populated, the Cossacks began moving toward the coastal areas. The following year, Vladivostok became the capital of Primorye Oblast and was officially granted city status.

==== A flourishing economy ====
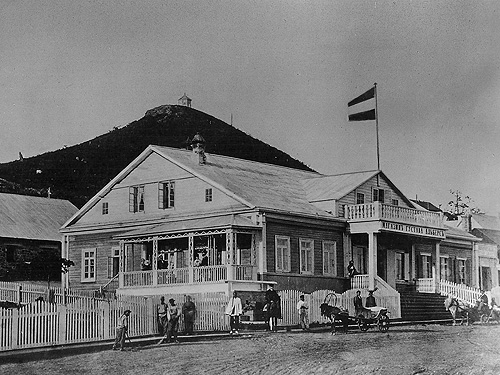
First Kunst & Albert store, 1876, Vladivostok.

As colonists arrived, Primorye's economy expanded across multiple sectors, including mining, forestry, manufacturing, and other industries. In 1867, gold was discovered on Askold Island (south of modern-day Fokino), leading to the establishment of a mine. The Nakhodka region became the center of mining activity, particularly for coal, iron, silver, and lead. Industrial development was concentrated around urban centers, with the establishment of shipyards in Vladivostok in 1864. The private sector began to flourish in the 1870s, and by 1890, more than 200 private enterprises were operating in Ussuriysk and Vladivostok, generating 314,000 rubles in revenue. Electricity was introduced to Primorye in the 1890s. By 1901, the Ussuriysk region alone had nearly 1,000 private enterprises with a total gross product exceeding 5 million rubles.

Resource exploitation surged in the 1860s, with the expansion of coal mining in the southern regions (Possiet Bay, Suchan) and gold prospecting. Several industries emerged, including industrial fishing, seafood processing, and whaling, with both Russian and foreign companies involved. Tanneries, distilleries, and other manufacturing facilities were established, and by 1900, Primorye was home to 395 mills. In Vladivostok, the Dalzavod Far Eastern Shipyard was founded. Large enterprises, such as Churin Trading House, Amur Fleet Partnership, Amur Gold Mining Partnership, and Kunst and Albers Trading House, established operations in Primorye, while smaller businesses were predominantly owned by Chinese and Korean entrepreneurs.

==== New transportation networks ====
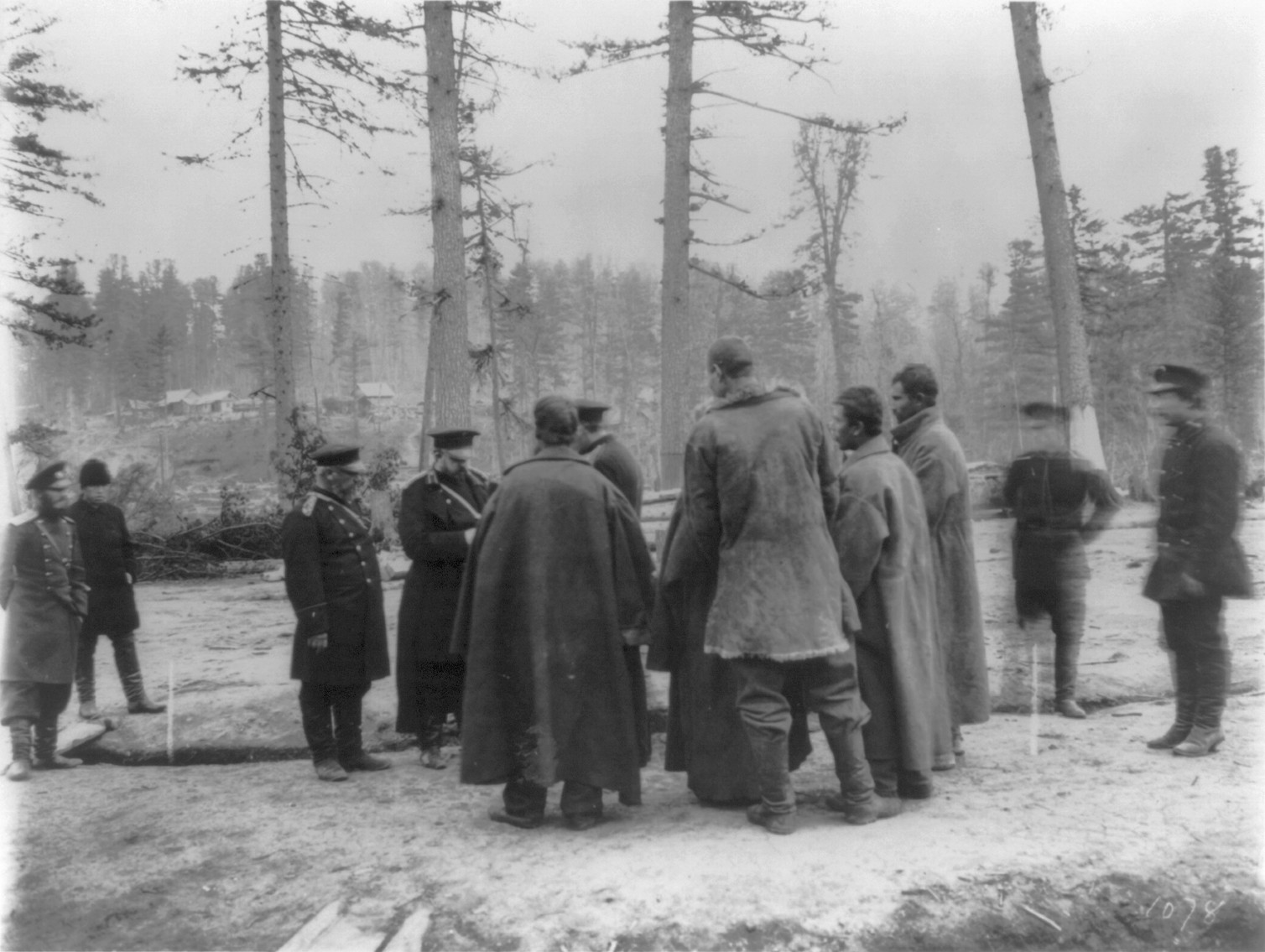
Construction of the Trans-Siberian Railway near Ussuriysk in 1895

During this period, the first major roads in the Russian Far East were built. The first road connected Kamen-Rybolov to Razdolnoe via the village of Nikolskoe. Additional routes were later constructed between Nikolskoe and Anuchino, and between Razdolnoe and Possiet. River navigation flourished on the Ussuri River until the arrival of the railway. In 1854, the first steamship service was launched on the Amur River and its tributaries, followed by the creation of the Amur-Ussuri Cossack Flotilla—a unique military fleet in Russian history. This flotilla, along with its ships, was based in Iman.

In 1889, the Ussuri Cossacks were established to contribute to the construction of the Trans-Siberian Railway, which was decreed in 1891 by Alexander III. This railway was intended to connect Moscow to Vladivostok. The construction of the Trans-Siberian Railway stimulated regional economic activity, fostering growth in trade, migration, and capital flows. On November 2, 1893 (November 14 in the Gregorian calendar), the railway line between Vladivostok and Ussuriysk was opened. By 1897, the line extended all the way to Khabarovsk. Additionally, between 1897 and 1903, the Chinese Eastern Railway was built across Manchuria to establish a more direct connection between Transbaikalia and Primorye.

==== A continuing population increase ====
Between 1861 and 1900, a total of 69,927 people settled in Primorye, including 60,263 peasants (87.2%), 7,831 Cossacks (11.2%), and 1,832 individuals from other social groups (2.6%). The majority of settlers arrived after 1883, with 56,000 arriving between 1881 and 1901—55,000 of them traveling by sea on journeys lasting two to three months via Suez and Malacca. Most settlers were from Ukraine, comprising 77% of the total, mainly from the Chernihiv, Kyiv, and Poltava oblasts. There were also significant numbers of Belarusians and peasants from southern Russian regions (Astrakhan, Voronezh), as well as Viatka, Tambov, and even Siberia (Irkutsk). On June 22, 1900 (July 5 in the Gregorian calendar), new regulations in Primorye and the Amur region reduced the land allocation for new settlers from 100 acres to 15 acres. Another group of settlers came from those exiled by the Tsarist regime to forced labor in Siberia. By 1900, exiles made up 4,000 people, or 1.4% of the region's population.

With Russian authorities' approval, Koreans (Koryo-saram) and Chinese also migrated to Primorye, fleeing famine, floods, and increasing feudal exploitation in their home countries. For Koreans, this also included oppression under Japanese occupation. These migrants found work in construction and mining, settling mainly in the southern coastal regions and along the rivers.

==== Expeditions to the borders of Primorye ====
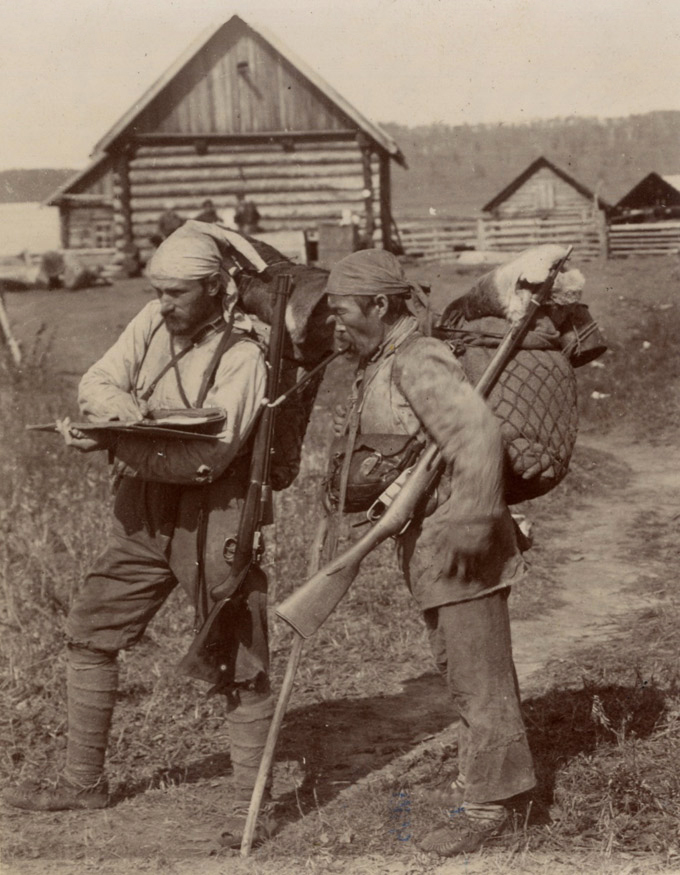
Vladimir Arseniev and Dersu Uzala on an exploration mission (photo from 1906). His account of the exploration with his friend Nikolai later enabled him to write Dersu Uzala.

Despite its annexation, the region remained largely unexplored, prompting numerous expeditions. Between 1850 and 1869 alone, 63 expeditions took place. Between 1867 and 1869, Nikolai Przhevalsky, a Polish-born naturalist, Russian imperial army officer, geographer, and explorer of Central Asia, surveyed the Ussuri region. He later published a book detailing its geography, flora, fauna, climate, history, and ethnography. Other notable explorers included Konstantin Stepanovich Staritsky (1868–1870) and Stepan Makarov, a naval officer and oceanographer who circumnavigated the globe aboard the corvette Vityaz, exploring the region's coastline.

In 1884, the Society for the Study of the Amur Region was founded in Vladivostok, with Theodor Friedrichowitsch Busse as its first president. The society compiled a vast collection of research materials, significantly contributing to the development of ethnography, archaeology, and philology in Primorye. In 1890, the first regional history center in the Russian Far East—later known as the Arseniev Museum—was founded in Vladivostok. The city also became home to a botanical society and garden in 1900.

The most famous explorer of Primorye was undoubtedly Vladimir Arseniev, whose legacy is commemorated in numerous streets, statues, and institutions, including the Arseniev Museum. A military topographer, Arseniev arrived in the Russian Far East in 1900 and spent the next 30 years there, dying in Vladivostok in 1930. Traveling on foot and by boat, he covered tens of thousands of kilometers through the unexplored regions of the Amur, Sakhalin, Kamchatka, and especially Ussuri. His collected data and detailed descriptions of natural history and ethnography were among the most comprehensive of the time. Arseniev authored more than 50 scientific works and numerous reports. During one of his many expeditions, on August 3, 1906 (August 16 in the Gregorian calendar), he met Dersu Uzala, a native Ussurian of the Nanai tribe (formerly called "Golde"), with whom he formed a close friendship. Dersu Uzala became his guide. Arseniev's most famous book, Dersu Uzala, was later adapted into a film—Dersu Uzala (1976), a Soviet-Japanese collaboration directed by Akira Kurosawa. The film won the 1976 Academy Award for Best Foreign Language Film.

On October 21, 1899 (November 2 in the Gregorian calendar), Vladivostok saw the establishment of the first higher education institution in the Russian Far East: the Oriental Institute. The institute focused on the study of neighboring countries, including China, Tibet, Manchuria, Korea, and Japan. It played a crucial role in strengthening ties between Russia and the East and housed one of the most extensive specialized libraries on the subject. This institution was the precursor to today's Far Eastern Federal University.

==== The economic rise of Primorye despite wars (1900–1917) ====
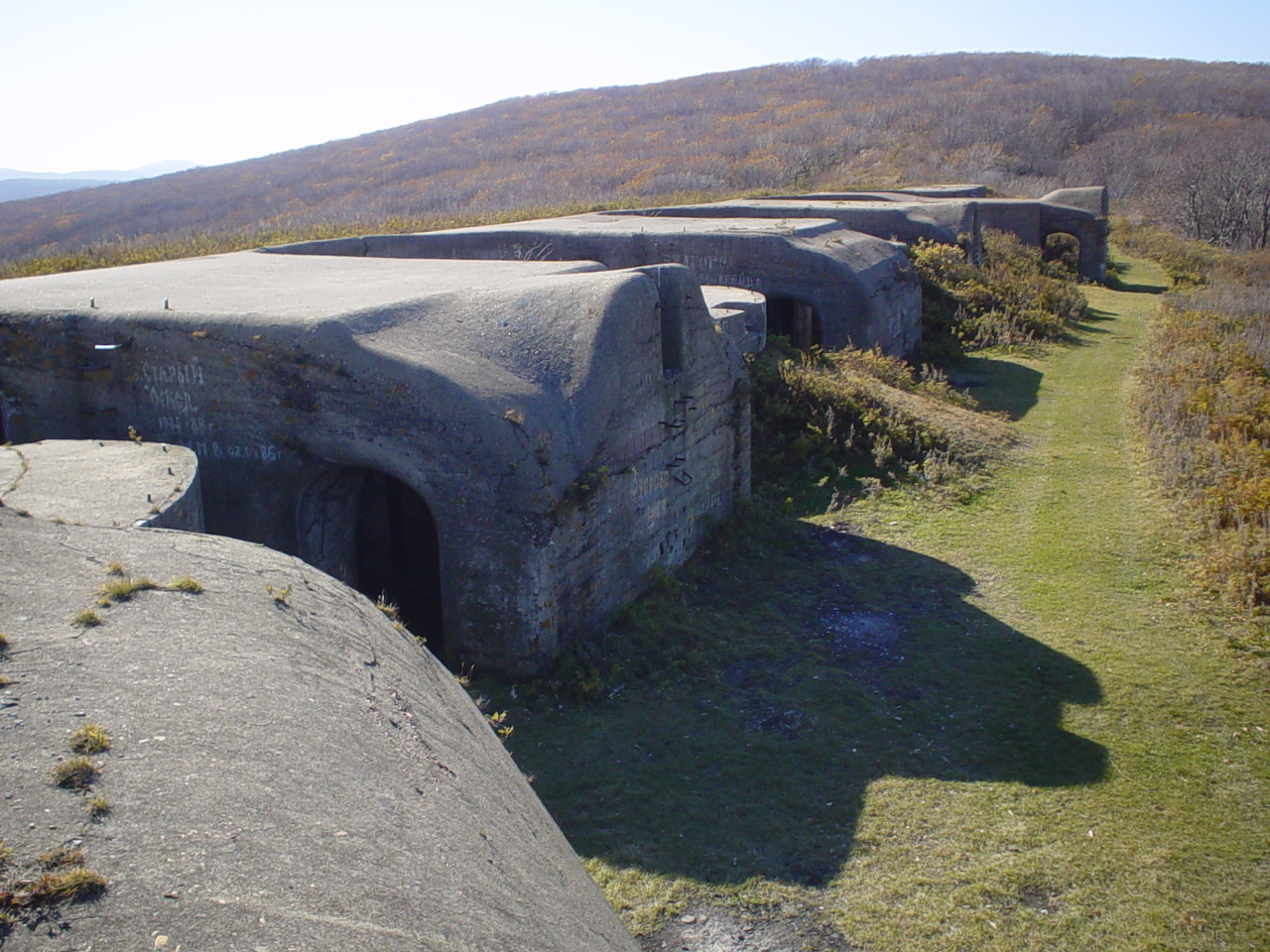
A battery of the fortress of Vladivostok, built between 1899 and 1903.

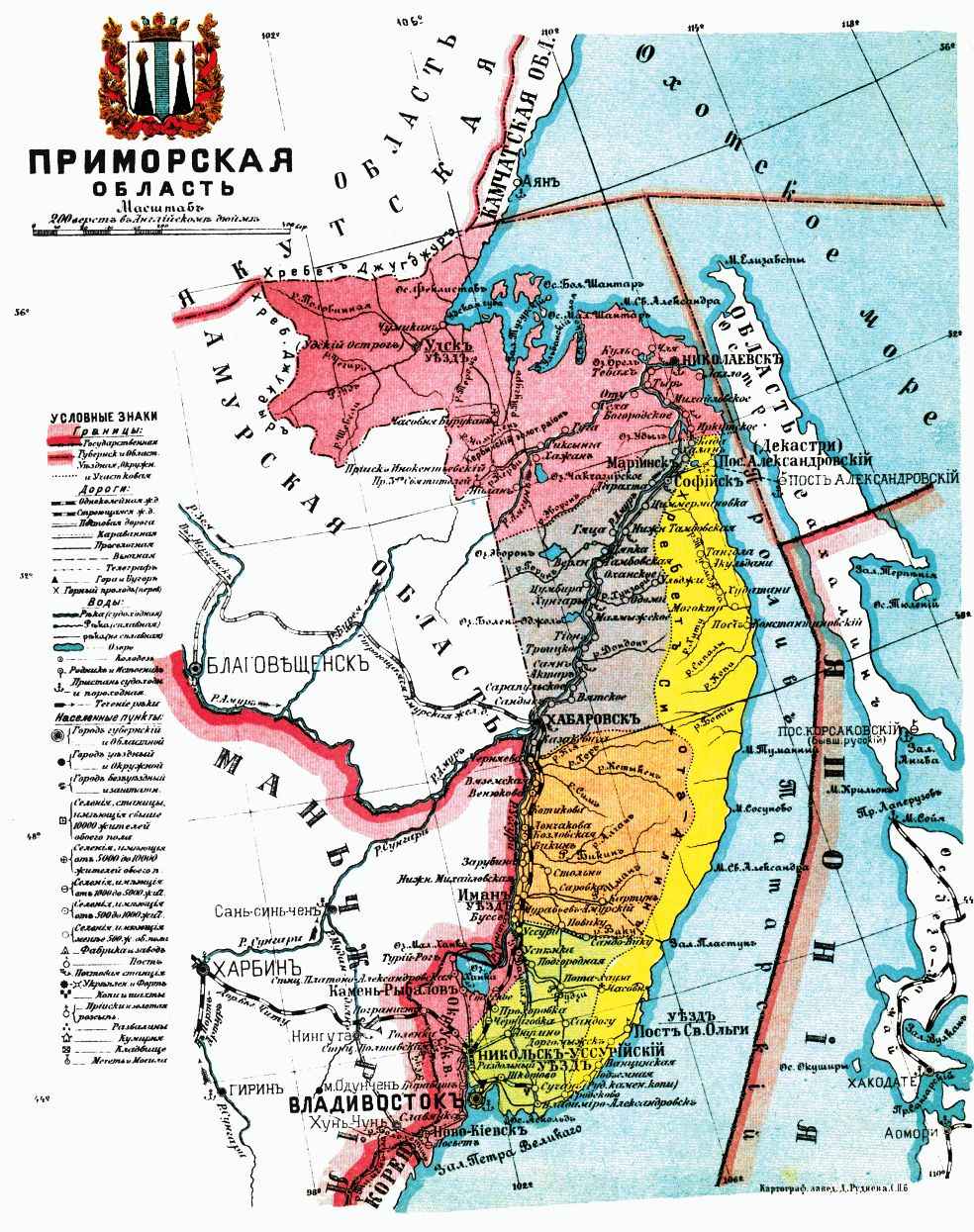
Primorsky Oblast in 1913.

The early 20th century was marked by economic crisis, as the Russian Empire faced a defeat against Japan and a revolution. By 1906, the number of businesses had stagnated compared to 1901, and production had fallen by more than one-third. The fishing industry was particularly hard hit, as many Russian fishing boats were confiscated by the Japanese. Additionally, Japanese fishermen were granted fishing rights in Primorye, creating intense competition for Russian fishermen.

==== The Russo-Japanese War and its Impacts ====
The Russo-Japanese War between 1904 and 1905 had a significant impact on Primorye. Just before the war, in the summer of 1903, a large number of ships left Vladivostok for Port Arthur. During the war, the region served as a rear base, and in the spring of 1904, the city of Vladivostok was bombarded for 45 minutes by Japanese warships. Once the defeat against the Japanese was confirmed, many Russians living in Manchuria, Port Arthur, and Sakhalin sought refuge in the region.

==== The 1905 Russian revolution in Primorye and its aftermath ====
The Russian Revolution of 1905 also affected the region. The signing of the October Manifesto by Emperor Nicholas II of Russia on October 17, 1905 (October 30 in the Gregorian calendar), under the influence of Sergei Witte, was reported by Primorye newspapers starting on October 21. On the same day, Vladivostok witnessed its first demonstration. On October 26, during a protest organized by the Society for Popular Readings, around 3,000 people participated, including soldiers and sailors. Discontent grew within the military in Vladivostok, and on October 30 and 31, military unrest led to mass pogroms and fires, resulting in more than 180 people being injured or killed, with financial losses estimated at 8 to 10 million imperial rubles. On November 12, the "Port Arthur Uprising" broke out in Vladivostok, led by participants in the Battle of Port Arthur who had returned from captivity in Japan, with demonstrators overwhelming their officers. However, the uprising was suppressed in the following days. In December 1905, as an act of solidarity, postal and telegraph workers, along with employees in Khabarovsk, went on strike, disrupting communications between the two ends of the country for several days.

By the end of 1905, the revolution had reached its peak with the formation of the first unions along the Ussuri railway and in the port of Vladivostok. Soviets (literally "councils") also emerged as revolutionary governing bodies. On December 12, 1905 (December 25 in the Gregorian calendar), a mass gathering of thousands of soldiers and sailors took place in Vladivostok, where the "Executive Committee of the Lower Ranks of the Vladivostok Garrison" was elected. Consisting of 12 members, it essentially acted as the Soldiers' Deputies Council. That same month, a charter for the peasant union of the southern Ussuri region was adopted at a peasant congress in Nikolsk-Ussuriysk, with additional gatherings occurring in Cossack villages.

On January 10, 1906, on the anniversary of Bloody Sunday, (Note: Due to the time difference, although Bloody Sunday occurred on January 9, 1905 (January 22 in the Gregorian calendar), it was already January 10 in Primorye.) a demonstration took place. It was suppressed by order of city commander Andrei Selivanov, with machine gun fire opened on the demonstrators, resulting in around 90 casualties. In response, an uprising erupted in the city, with authorities overwhelmed by protesters. On January 16, funerals for the victims took place before a massive crowd, while the city remained in the hands of the insurgents. However, during the night of January 23, Cossack troops under General Pavel Mishchenko entered Vladivostok, disarming the rebels.

In 1906 and 1907, anti-government forces in Primorye were led by leftist parties, including the Russian Social Democratic Labour Party (RSDLP), the Socialist Revolutionaries (SR), and anarchists. At the beginning of 1907, the Vladivostok RSDLP had significantly strengthened, establishing an underground printing press and forming ties with cells in Khabarovsk and Nikolsk-Ussuriysk. In April, at a congress in Vladivostok, the Far Eastern Union of the Socialist Revolutionary Party was founded. However, following the June 3, 1907 coup, revolutionary organizations faced repression. On July 11, 1907 (July 24 in the Gregorian calendar), social-democratic members of the Vladivostok military were arrested, and their leader was executed. Censorship was imposed across the country, along with the suppression of unions and political parties.

In the following years, despite censorship and repression, political life took hold in the region, marked by conferences, trade organizations, unions, strikes, and frequent clashes between police and activists. In 1913 alone, there were 523 social movements in the Primorye province, including 187 in Vladivostok. In response to these movements, on September 1, 1913 (September 14 in the Gregorian calendar), a factory inspection system was introduced in the province.

==== Economic revival and easier settlement in Primorye ====
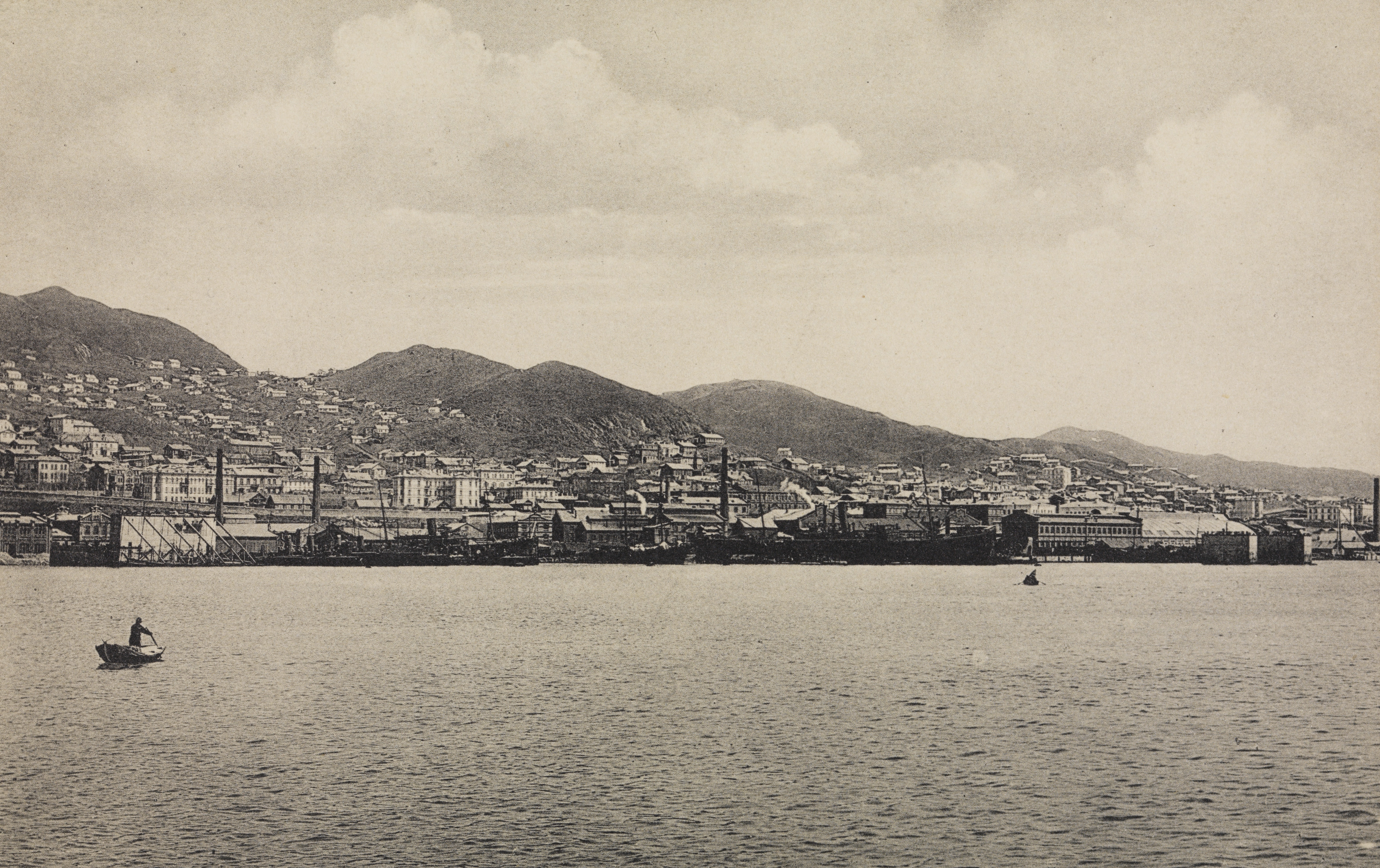
Vladivostok in 1916.

The economy emerged from the crisis in 1908 as state investments increased, particularly in transportation and the military sector, alongside continued migration. By 1913, the regional GDP had reached 13.6 million rubles, and in 1914, it nearly doubled to 25 million rubles. (Note: Does not include the public sector.) Of this, 16 million rubles came from agriculture, 3.5 million from mining, and 1.2 million from printing. Public enterprises were often highly productive, with the largest, Dalzavod, and Vladivostok's shipyards alone generating 3 million rubles. Mechanization had begun in the region, and the mining sector was expanding, with coal production rising from 7.8 million pounds in 1905 to over 36 million pounds in 1916. Just before the Civil War, GDP had reached 36 million rubles, with 24 million from agriculture and industry combined and 11 million from mining.

Unlike in European Russia, peasants in the region were large landowners. On average, each family in Primorye owned 24 hectares of land, compared to only 1 to 2 hectares in European Russia. Furthermore, the region was far more urbanized, with 20.1% of Primorye's population living in cities in 1896, rising to 28% by 1913, while the national average was 13.4% and 17.9%, respectively. The population was also highly male-dominated, with only 28.4% women according to the 1897 census, increasing to 38.9% in 1914. Over time, Asian populations—primarily Chinese and Koreans—declined, from 26.4% in 1897 to 17% in 1913.

Pyotr Stolypin, Prime Minister under Emperor Nicholas II, encouraged the colonization of Primorye. His 1906 land reform facilitated the influx of peasants into the Far East, and in 1909, he established the Committee for Resettlement in the Far East, further developing the "Program 105." This program offered various benefits to settlers, including state-funded transportation, an allowance of 100 to 200 rubles depending on the resettlement zone, preliminary land development, and the establishment of schools, medical posts, and roads in villages. Despite bureaucratic obstacles, the program was a success: between 1900 and 1916, more than 200,000 people arrived in the Primorye province.

Maritime transport experienced a significant surge during this period. By 1915, the port of Vladivostok had become one of the five largest Russian ports and the foremost in the Far East. It welcomed hundreds of merchant ships, including many foreign vessels. This period also marked Vladivostok's transformation into an international city, hosting a dozen consulates and numerous foreign trade missions. A major factor behind this influx was World War I, which led to the blockade of European Russian ports.

On January 1, 1910, Kamchatka and Sakhalin Island were administratively separated from the Primorye oblast, in accordance with the law of June 17, 1909. Then, on October 4, 1916, with the inauguration of the Khabarovsk Bridge, the Trans-Siberian Railway was completed, finally linking the region by rail to European Russia.

Between 1861 and 1917, a total of 245,476 peasants migrated to Primorye, establishing 342 predominantly agricultural villages. This led to a rapid expansion of agriculture, with widespread grain cultivation, large orchards (producing pears, grapes, and currants), and extensive livestock farming. Crop rotation techniques and mechanization were introduced for the first time. On the eve of the Russian Civil War in 1917, the population of Primorye had reached 307,332, spread across 53,078 households, including 42,033 Cossacks. The region had over 185,000 cattle, 181,000 pigs, and 100,000 horses. Around 235,912 people worked in agriculture, and nearly 300 mills operated throughout the area.

=== Revolutions and the Russian Civil War ===
==== February to October 1917 ====
News of Nicholas II's abdication, following the February Revolution, reached Primorye only the day after the event. Socialist organizations aligned themselves with the Petrograd Soviet, even though the new oblast commissioner was appointed by the Provisional Government. A Soviet was elected in Vladivostok on March 4, followed by similar elections in Sutchan, Nikolsk-Ussuriysk, and Anuchino in the following days. The Ussuri Cossacks also formed an executive committee. Political parties began to take shape in Primorye, with the Socialist Revolutionary Party and the Russian Social Democratic Labor Party (RSDLP), which included both Bolsheviks and Mensheviks, emerging as dominant forces. By September, the RSDLP had around 5,000 members in the Russian Far East, with approximately 2,000 Bolsheviks concentrated in Primorye. The regional Soviet committee was established in Vladivostok in May.

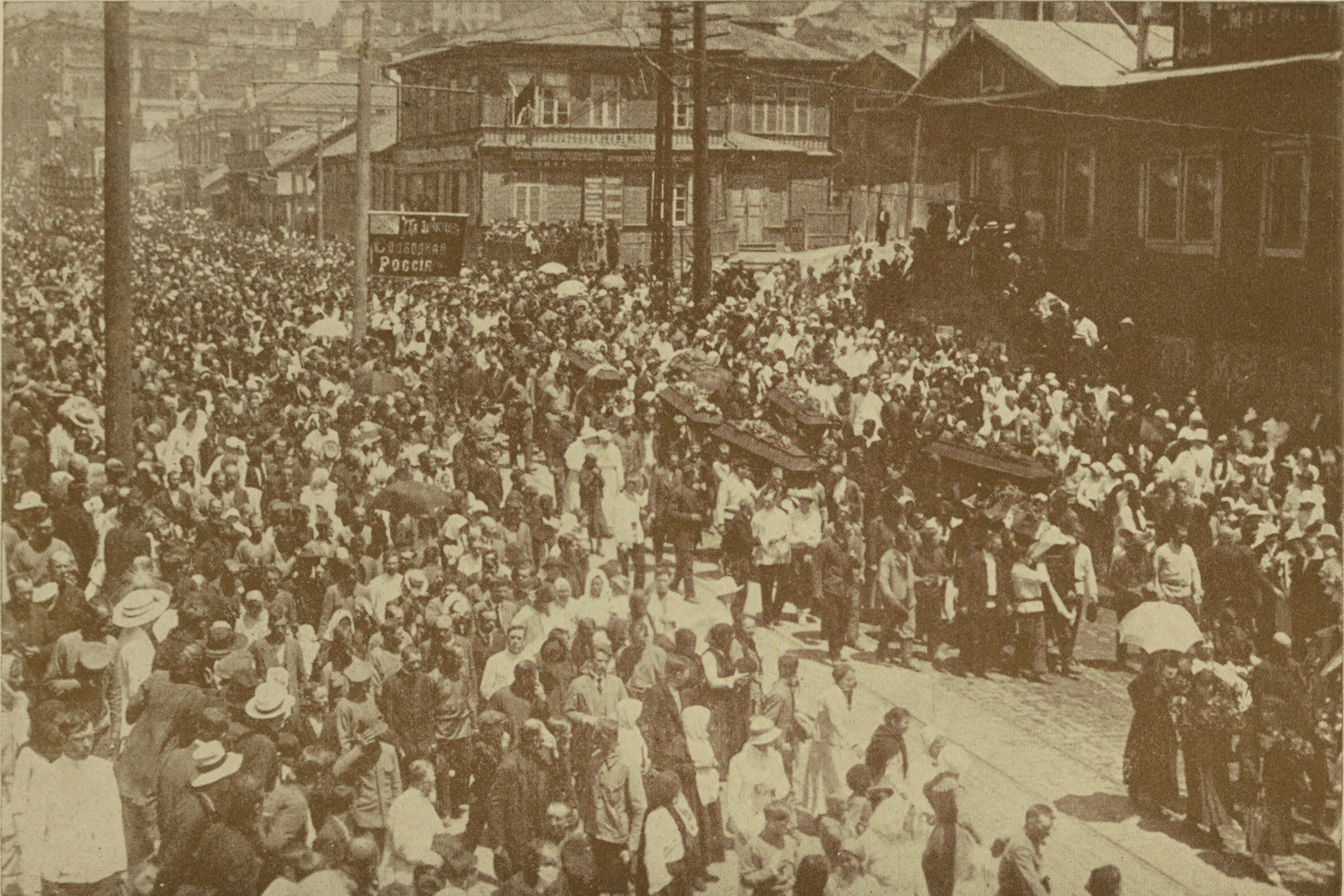
Pro-Soviet demonstration in 1917 in Vladivostok.

Trade unions flourished in Vladivostok, with more than 36,000 workers unionized by June 1917. Leftist parties, through the Soviet, sought to extend their influence within the military, which had more than 40,000 soldiers and 6,000 sailors in Primorye. By summer, Bolshevik influence had grown substantially, with Bolshevik committees forming across the region. On September 2, an eight-hour workday was implemented in state enterprises in Vladivostok, and a six-hour workday for industrial workers. In September, Red Guards units were formed under Bolshevik leadership in Vladivostok, Iman, and Nikolsk-Ussuriysk. Following the failed Kornilov affair in September, the regional Soviet committee, acting under the Provisional Government, ordered the dissolution of all united executive committees that included multiple parties. However, the united executive committee of the Vladivostok Soviet remained in power, thanks to cooperation among local party branches. Overall, the region increasingly leaned towards Bolshevism, particularly in the Soviets of Nikolsk-Ussuriysk and Sutchan.

==== News of the Bolshevik takeover ====
The news of the October Revolution reached Primorye on November 8 (October 26 in the Julian calendar), the day after it occurred, via telegrams. Initially, the regional commissioner of the Provisional Government kept the information secret, but on November 10, 1917, the Vladivostok Soviet revealed it in a distorted manner. It was only later that month, upon the return of Primorye's delegates from the Second All-Russian Congress of Soviets, that the news was fully published along with Lenin's decrees on peace, land, nationalities, and worker control. This was also when the Council of People's Commissars was established. That same month, zemstvos and local governments were formed across Primorye, with municipal councils elected by direct universal suffrage. A regional council appeared in December, while the Bolshevik Krasnochtchekov proclaimed Soviet power in Primorye, refusing to recognize the zemstvos and instead advocating for the election of executive committees. The zemstvos and municipal governments, already dissatisfied with Bolshevik economic policies, sought to regain power, receiving support from the Allied consular bodies in Vladivostok, which opposed the Bolsheviks. The Bolsheviks implemented factory controls, distributed land to peasants, and recruited for the Red Army. Tensions in Primorye grew, particularly regarding the Cossacks, as the Ussuri Cossacks sought greater autonomy, which meant independence from Soviet authority.

==== Foreign powers and white forces involvement ====
In December 1917, the Allied powers agreed to intervene in various parts of Russia. In January 1918, two Japanese and Anglo-American cruisers entered Vladivostok's port. Meanwhile, the Fourth Military Circle (Note: A military circle was the highest governing body of the Cossacks.) elected Ivan Kalmykov as ataman, who began seeking financial support from France, the United Kingdom, and Japan. Wishing to establish independence from the Bolsheviks, Kalmykov formed military detachments along the Chinese Eastern Railway. However, in March, he was replaced by a Soviet loyalist. In the countryside, pro-Soviet peasant and Cossack councils emerged. Along the Chinese Eastern Railway, Dmitry Khorvat, Grigory Semyonov, and Kalmykov also formed military units.

On April 4, 1918, under the pretext of avenging the assassination of two Japanese citizens in Vladivostok, Japanese and British ships deployed over 15,000 troops into the city over two days, officially to protect their nationals. Lenin warned the Vladivostok Soviet about the possibility of an Allied intervention, advising them to prepare and evacuate key assets. However, by late April, the troops were recalled to their ships—though this event was merely a rehearsal for a future intervention. On April 26, 1918, the first detachment of the Czechoslovak Legion departed from Russia, giving them control over the entire Trans-Siberian Railway. In May, a section of the Czechoslovak Legion revolted along the railway in Siberia. (Note: The last two counties mentioned are now part of the present-day Khabarovsk Krai.)

==== Seizure by the White Armies and allied intervention ====
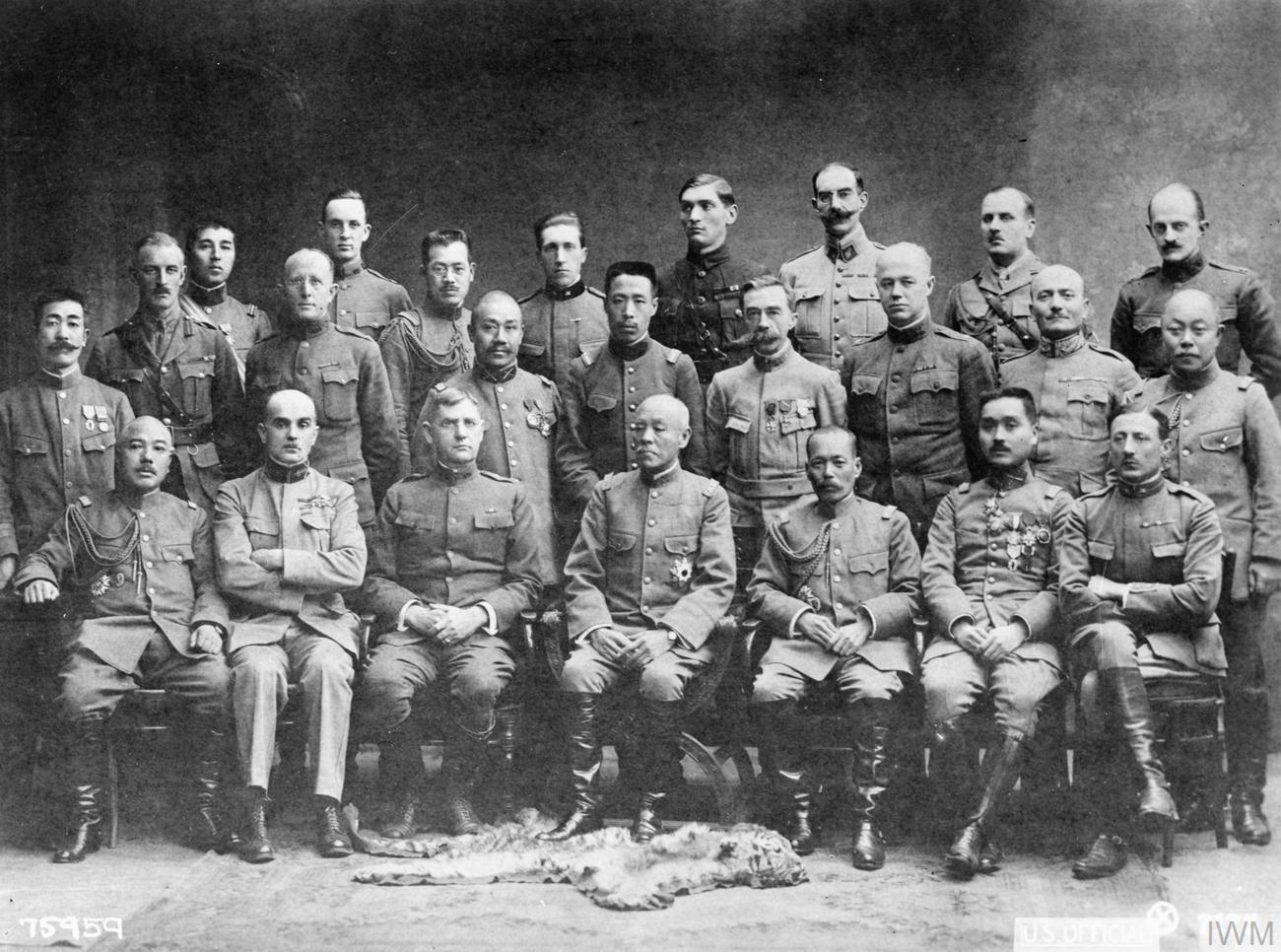
Siberia- Civil War and Western Intervention 1918-1920. Allied Commanders of the Siberian Intervention, with William S. Graves (3rd) in the foreground and Gaston Renondeau (6th) in the background. Vladivostok, 1918.

On June 29, 1918, the Autonomous Siberian Provisional Government staged a coup in Vladivostok with the help of Mikhail Dieterichs and 10,000 soldiers from the Czechoslovak Legions. They arrested the executive committee of the Vladivostok Soviet. The next day, the GPSA ceded power to the Provisional Government of Autonomous Siberia, which was even more loyal to the White Armies. Battles took place in Volno-Nadezhdinskoye and Nikolsk-Ussuriysk, the latter falling to the Whites on July 8, 1918. Iman was taken on July 16, but on August 1, in Kaul, the Red Army launched an offensive that pushed the Whites 40 km south.

On the same day, the Allied intervention in Siberia began, with French, Japanese, British, Canadian, Italian, and American troops landing, primarily in Vladivostok. The Bolsheviks ordered a retreat from the region on September 4 in the face of the advancing Whites and Allies. A clandestine resistance emerged, and by August, a secret Bolshevik committee in Vladivostok had transformed into the Far Eastern Regional Committee of the Russian Communist Party (Bolsheviks) by early 1919. Meanwhile, on November 3, the provisional government was replaced by a directory, and on November 18, Admiral Kolchak took power. Kolchak's government, including in Primorye, failed to curb skyrocketing prices, the depreciation of the ruble, and economic collapse. The repression of Bolsheviks engaging in guerrilla warfare intensified, with arrests and executions.

Workers, unions, and Bolshevik sympathizers were closely monitored. Strikes broke out in spring 1919, followed by general strikes in July and August, which were violently suppressed. Kolchak's government distributed Cossack lands to peasants, but it remained unpopular due to the Japanese troops, whose excesses—executions, thefts, and other abuses—were widely resented. The Japanese ignored Kolchak's government and acted as an occupying force.

==== Gradual shift toward the reds ====
Partisan activity in Primorye intensified from December 1918, fueled by the forced conscription of young men into Kolchak's army. By spring, networks were active across the region, with over 3,000 fighters, primarily Bolsheviks. In April 1919, Sergey Georgievich Lazo, Moisey Gubelman, and A.P. Aniutin were sent to coordinate partisan forces. Strikes in May and July 1919 demanded the withdrawal of American and Japanese forces, while Lazo strengthened partisan movements in the Suchan Valley in June. Faced with growing resistance, Kolchak mobilized over 6,000 troops to suppress partisans in Primorye in July 1919.

After Kolchak's defeats in Siberia (notably the Great Siberian Ice March) and the withdrawal of Allied forces in 1920, the Bolsheviks initiated the creation of a buffer state—a democratic, bourgeois republic between Soviet Russia and Japan. The Allies, realizing the inevitable defeat of the Whites, began withdrawing. The U.S. State Department, though staunchly anti-Bolshevik, recognized that the Whites were a lost cause. On December 31, 1919, Major General William S. Graves ordered American troops to return to their quarters, and on January 5, 1920, Washington commanded the evacuation. The first American units left in early January, and despite strikes and sabotage along the Trans-Siberian Railway, the last soldiers and Graves departed on April 1, 1920. The British, Czechs, and French also withdrew. In June 1920, the final Czechoslovak units embarked from Vladivostok for European ports.

==== Communist takeover in Primorye ====
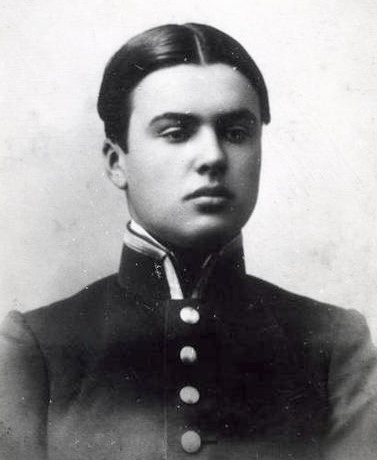
Sergey Lazo is undoubtedly one of the main revolutionaries of Primorye. The Lazovsky district is named in his honor.

Koltchak's government was overthrown in Nikolsk-Ussuriysk on January 26, 1920, followed by a coup in Vladivostok on February 1, 1920. Sergei Lazo and his comrades sought to Sovietize the region, though the Siberian Bureau of the Russian Communist Party (Bolsheviks) (Sibburo) advocated for a democratic, bourgeois republic. After extensive debates, Lenin endorsed this project to avoid provoking Japan, despite Lazo, Sibirtsev, and others underestimating the Japanese threat. Meanwhile, the Nikolaevsk Incident alarmed the Japanese, increasing their distrust of the Bolsheviks. As a result, the Bolsheviks agreed not to station Red Army troops in Primorye's cities and to establish a demarcation line between Japan and the future republic. On the night of April 4–5, 1920, the Japanese staged a coup in the major cities of Primorye and Priamurye, attempting to transfer power to alternative factions, who refused. Mass arrests and executions followed. Lazo, Lutski, and Sibirtsev were arrested, taken to the Muravyov-Amursky train station, and executed, their bodies burned. Approximately 7,000 soldiers and civilians were killed in the ensuing clashes.

On April 6, 1920, in Verkhneudinsk, the Far Eastern Republic (FER) was proclaimed as a buffer state between the Bolsheviks and the Japanese. On July 17, 1920, under the Gongota Agreement between the FER and Japan, a gradual withdrawal of Japanese forces from the Far East was decided. As the Japanese withdrew, White forces from Transbaikalia fled to Primorye. However, in autumn 1920, the Whites maintained control in Primorye and Nikolaevsk. Despite this, the FER exercised civil authority in Primorye, with Bolshevik Vasily Grigorievich Antonov leading the administration. Elections for the Far Eastern Constituent Assembly were held in January 1921, where the Bolsheviks won. The assembly adopted a constitution in April, proclaiming a multiparty system, equality of citizens, fundamental freedoms, and private property rights, with a liberal economy. In reality, however, the FER was a puppet state, autocratically controlled by the Bolsheviks. This unpopularity fueled non-socialist movements.

By March 1921, the White Armies regrouped in Harbin, planning a coup. Their first attempt on March 31, 1921, failed, but they managed to seize weapons from the departing Czechoslovak Legions. On May 23, White commander Kappel and his troops captured Nikolsk-Ussuriysk.

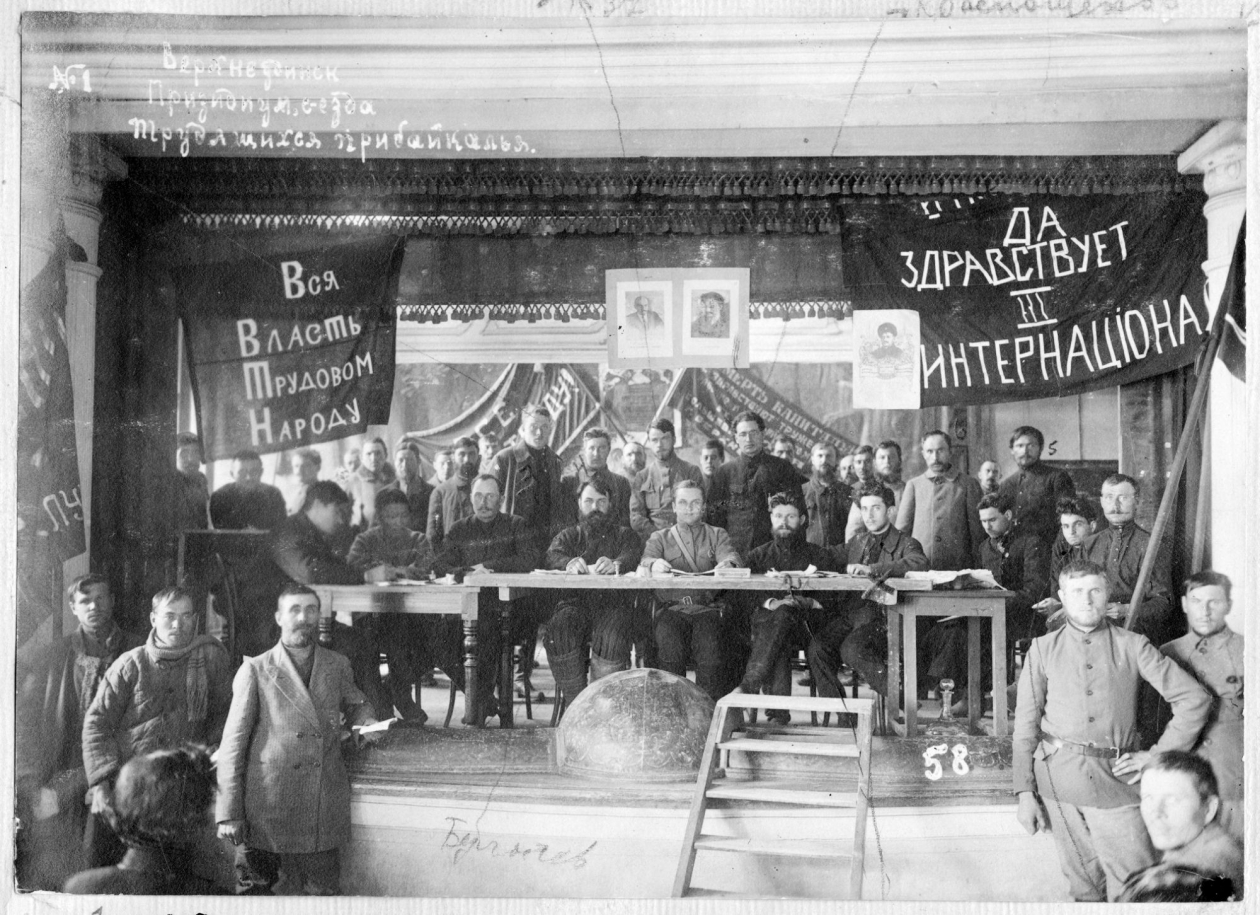
Council proclaiming the RSF in Verkhneudinsk.

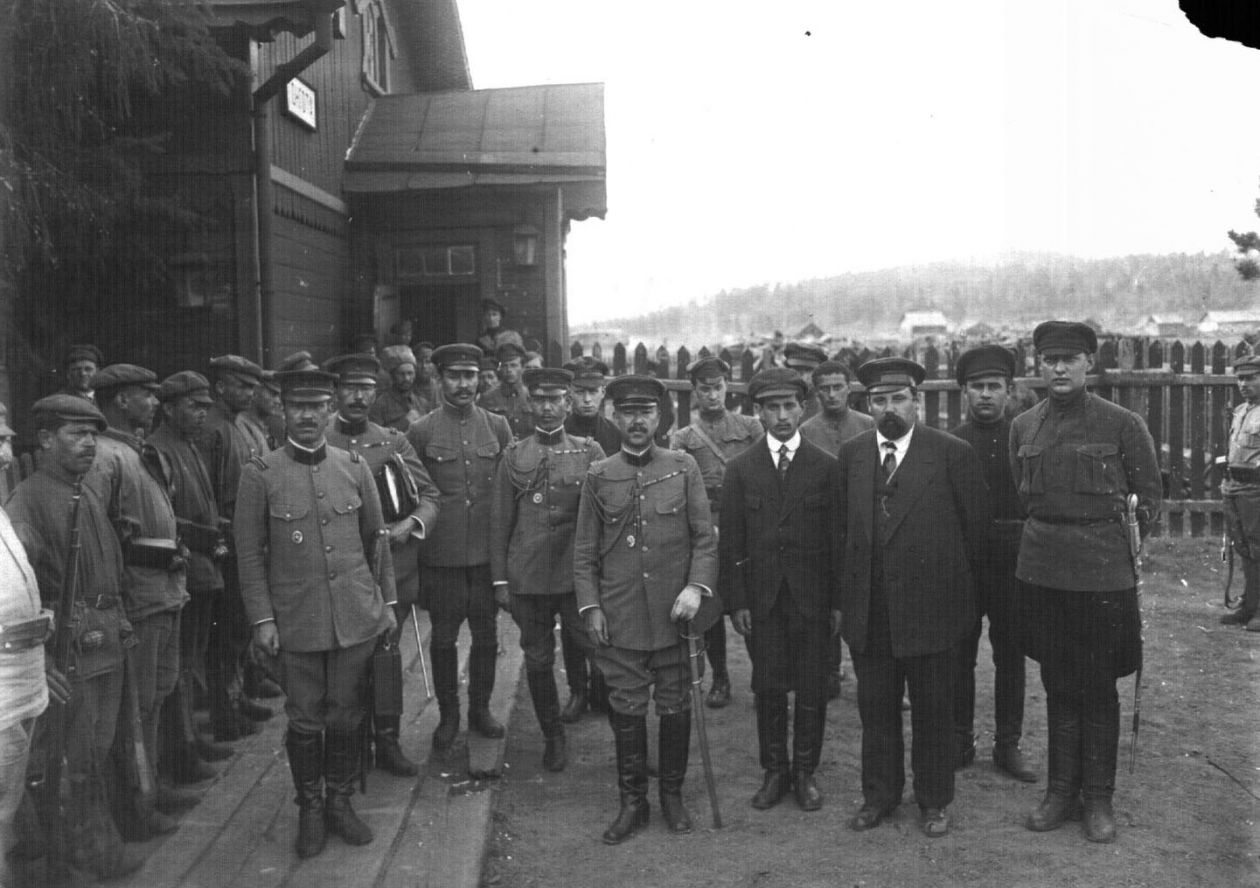
Meeting in April 1920 between Japanese and RSF representatives in Gongota (Zabaykalsky Krai).

==== Provisional government of Priamur under the Merkoulovs ====
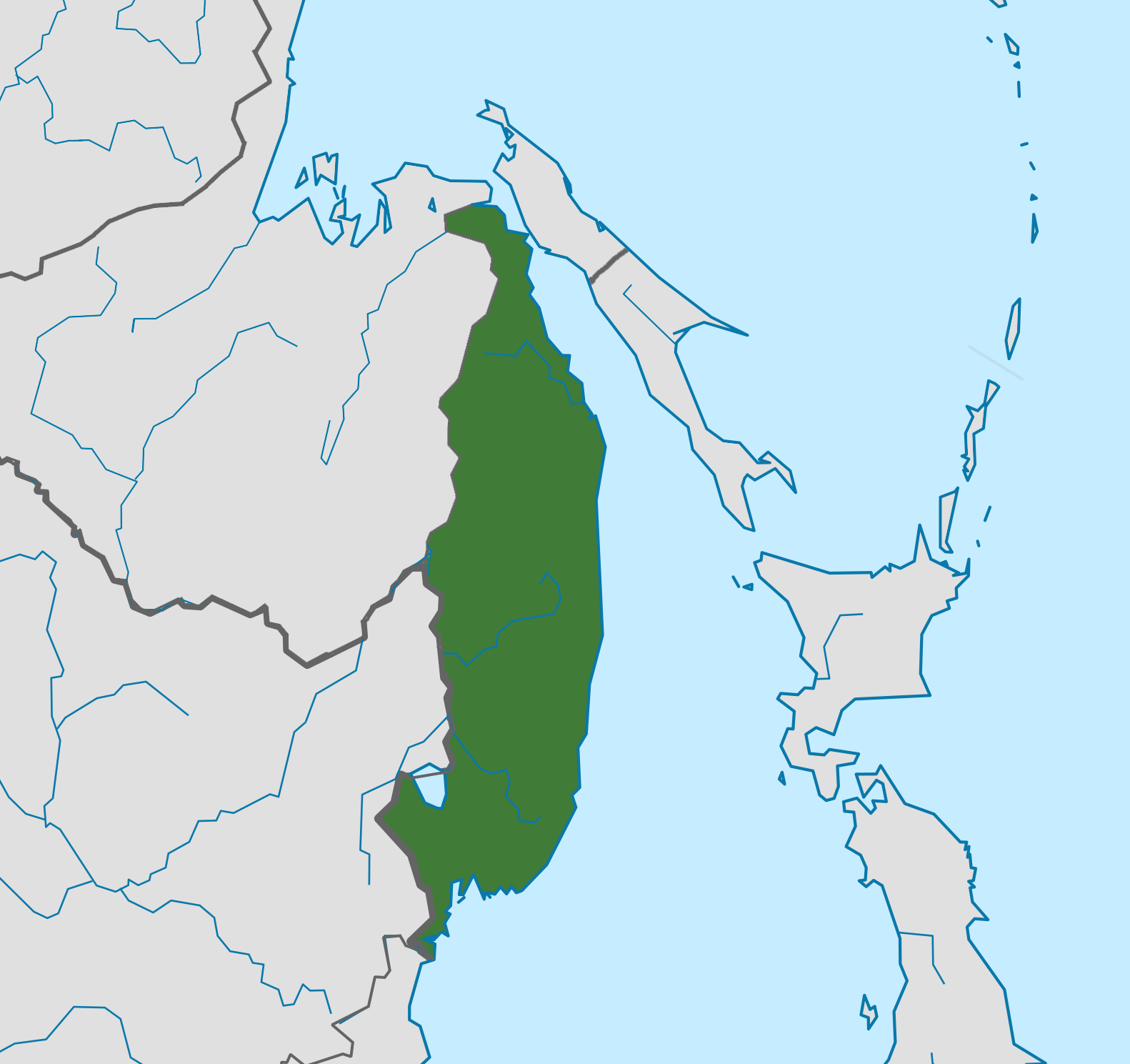
Map of the Priamur at the end of December 1921 at its maximum extension.

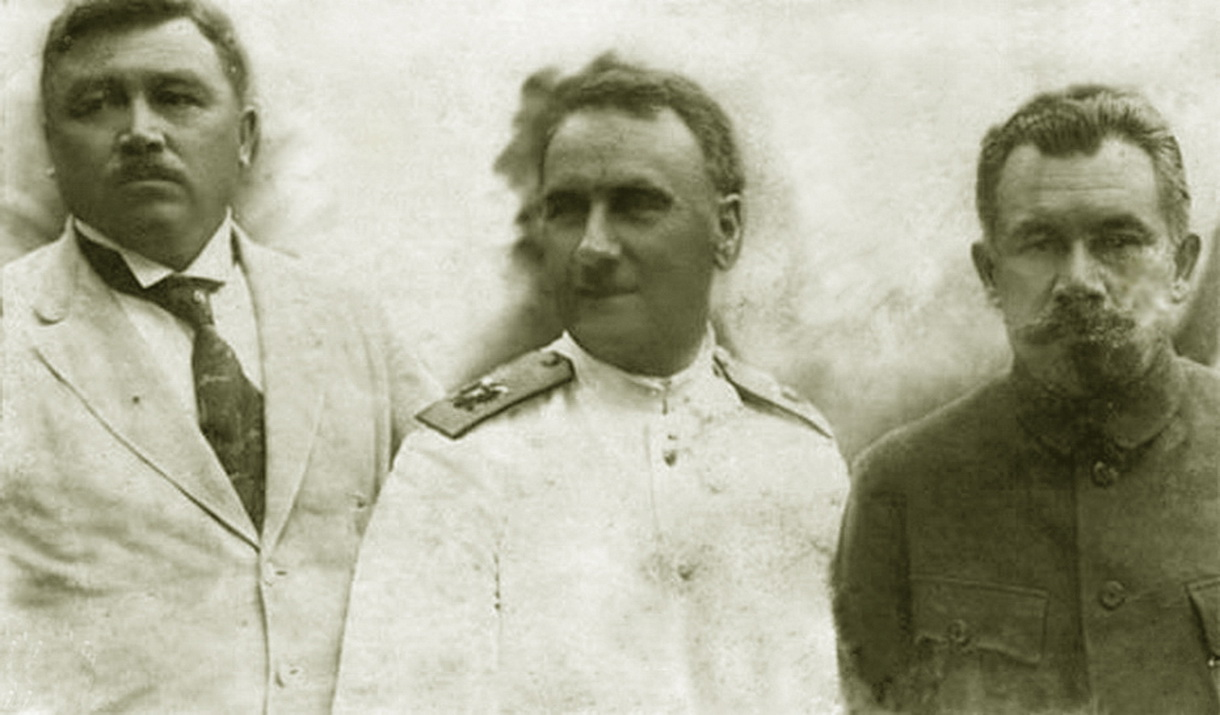
From left to right: Foreign Minister ND Merkulov, Admiral GK Stark and SD Merkulov, President of the Provisional Government of Priamur.

On May 26, 1921, the White Guard staged a coup in Vladivostok, establishing the Provisional Government of Priamur under Spiridon Dionisyevich Merkoulov. After twelve days of fighting, the Communists were expelled from Primorye. The White government formed an army, the Belopovstanskaya (BPA), consisting of 15,000 soldiers led by former Kolchak general Grigory Verzhbitsky. Cossack units from Transbaikalia and those under Vladimir Kappel were incorporated into the army. To distinguish itself from the FER, the government presented itself as democratic and liberal, restoring judicial independence while restricting press freedoms. However, its survival depended financially on Japanese support.

The Khabarovsk campaign was launched in November 1921 by Priamurye. On December 22, 1921, Khabarovsk was captured, marking an advance of more than 600 kilometers in less than two months, and the BPA then pushed beyond the Amur River. However, the situation was completely disorganized, with a lack of supplies and clothing. As a result, Khabarovsk was abandoned without a fight on February 14 by the NRA (the army of the FER). On February 27, Bikin was taken by the NRA, followed by Iman on March 18. This chaotic retreat led to conflicts between the government and the BPA command, with the latter accusing the former of relying on the advice of "irresponsible persons." Meanwhile, negotiations began between the RSFSR and Japan for a full evacuation of Primorye. By spring 1922, due to this anticipated withdrawal, morale was at an all-time low, the situation was desperate, and the possibility of a revolt was increasing.

==== Provisional government of Priamurye under Dieterichs' dictatorship ====
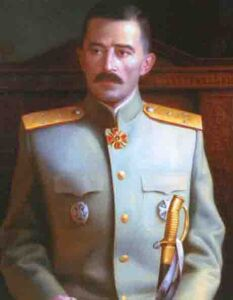
Portrait of Dieterichs.

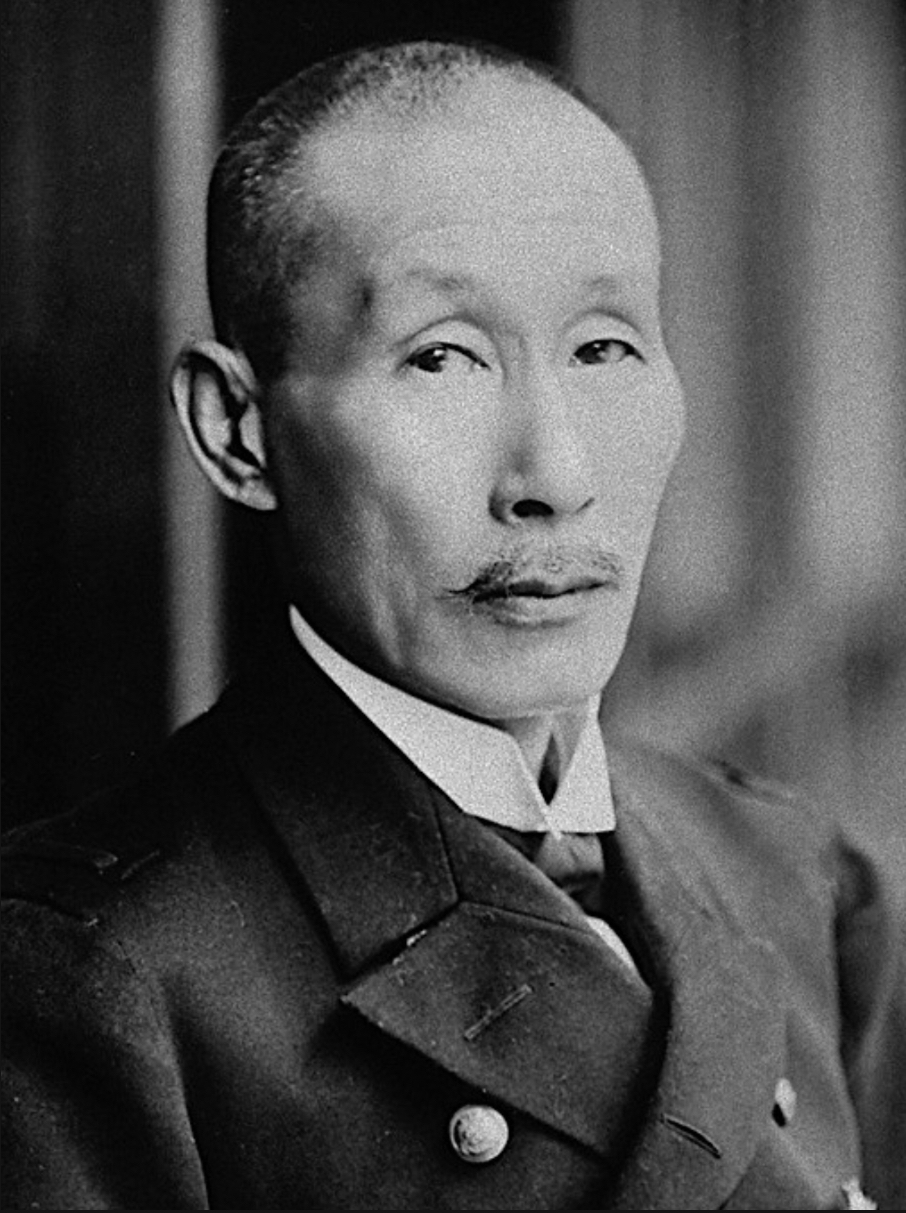
Katō Tomosaburō, who decided the end of the withdrawal.

On May 31, 1922, General Mikhail Dieterichs arrested the Merkoulov brothers after they dissolved the People's Assembly, using this as justification for his actions. The Assembly called on the military for help, and on June 1, 1922, it overthrew the government. However, Dieterichs kept the previous government, including the Merkoulovs, in place to maintain alliances, at least until the convocation of a zemski sobor, which the Cossacks had proposed in early June. Elections were held in July to select representatives for the zemski sobor, with all eligible except communists and socialists. The zemski sobor opened on July 23, 1922, and concluded on August 10. On August 8, Dieterichs officially became governor, and the country became a military dictatorship, relying on the Russian Orthodox Church for legitimacy. The BPA was renamed the "Zemskaïa Rat," and communists and socialists were expelled from the territory. Dieterichs attempted in vain to persuade industrialists to support him. Meanwhile, the Japanese, under Prime Minister Katō Tomosaburō, withdrew from Spassk in early September as the NRA advanced and Dieterichs lost more and more territory.

On September 2, 1922, Dieterichs launched an offensive toward Khabarovsk, briefly recapturing some villages and Spassk. However, on October 4, the NRA launched the Primorye Operation. On October 8 and 9, the Battle of Spassk-Dalni was won by the NRA, allowing it to advance southward. By the evening of October 15, the Red Army had reached Nikolsk-Ussuriysk and the Grodekovo district. On October 19, the 1st Transbaikal Division reached the outskirts of Vladivostok, which was still occupied by the Japanese. A general strike began on October 21 in Vladivostok in support of the NRA.

After the Battle of Spassk, it became clear that the region would fall. As early as summer, there were plans to retreat to Petropavlovsk-Kamchatsky to establish an independent state in Kamchatka under Japanese protection. On October 16, Admiral Stark sought Dieterichs' approval for this plan, to which Dieterichs replied that Stark could do as he pleased with the Siberian flotilla. The evacuation of the remnants of the White armies began, with the government and civilians fleeing to the then-Japanese port of Wonsan. The plan for retreat to Kamchatka was abandoned.

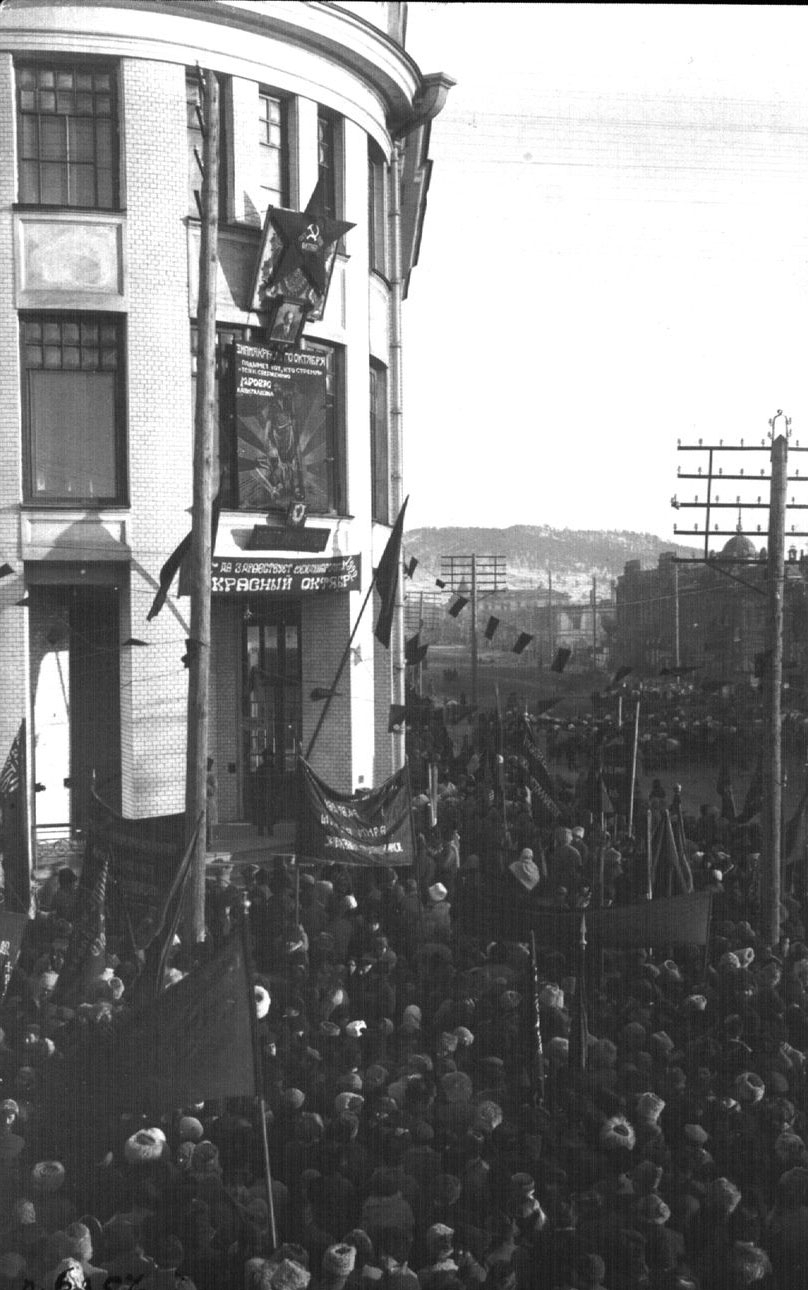
Pro-communist demonstration on the 14th in Vladivostok for accession in front of the People's Assembly.

On October 24, the Japanese and the FER government signed an agreement at the Sedanka halt, stipulating that Japanese troops would withdraw by October 25, 1922, at 4:00 PM. At that time, the Red Army entered Vladivostok without a fight, marking the fall of the last major White Army stronghold. The collapse of White control in the region was acknowledged only by the RSFSR, while European countries deemed the area insignificant. On November 8 and 9, large demonstrations were organized by the Bolsheviks to demand the integration of the FER into the RSFSR. On November 14, the FER People's Assembly passed a resolution for this purpose, and on November 15, the All-Russian Central Executive Committee approved the request. On November 20, Lenin declared: "Vladivostok is far away, but it is ours."

=== Soviet period ===
==== 1920s and 1930s ====
===== Incorporation into Soviet Russia =====
On November 15, 1922, the Far Eastern Republic was dissolved and incorporated into the Russian Soviet Federative Socialist Republic (RSFSR). Primorye was integrated into the Far Eastern Oblast, with Chita as its capital. This oblast, which also included the present-day Khabarovsk Krai, was divided into several districts, including Primorye. Within this province, there were five administrative okruhs: Vladivostok, Nikolsk-Ussuriysk, Spassk, Nikolaevsk, and Khabarovsk.

===== Changing demographics and economy under external influence =====
During the 1920s, many dissidents fled to neighboring Manchuria, where they established Russian colonies. The border was highly porous with China and Korea, allowing for banditry and smuggling. The Soviet secret police, the GPU, intervened to monitor the border and curb growing criminal activities. In 1925, smuggling accounted for 12% of all goods traded in Primorye, including 29% of alcohol. However, this porous border also facilitated the migration of many Koreans fleeing Japanese rule, particularly in the southern parts of Primorye. In the Possiet district, 90% of the population was Korean. Many Chinese laborers arrived for seasonal work.

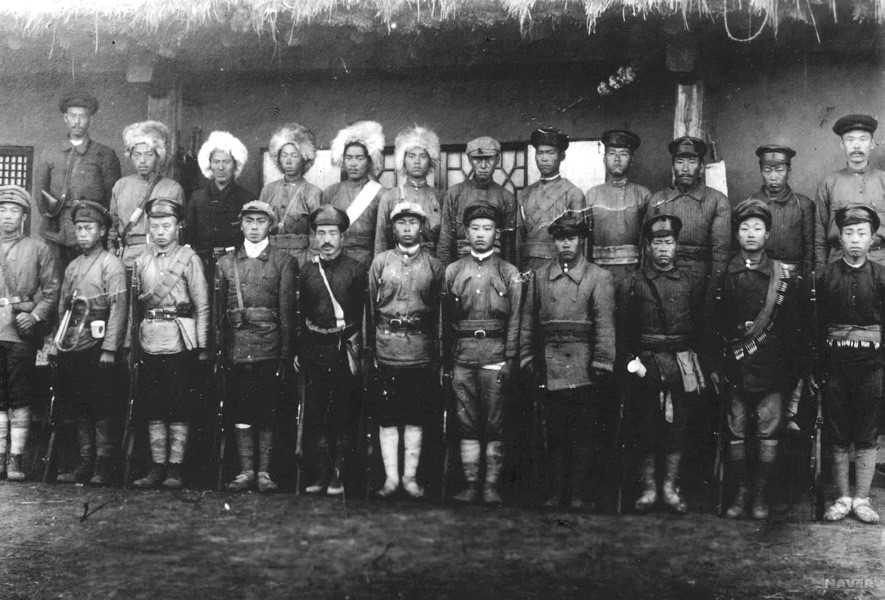
Korean supporters in Primorye

In 1926, the population of the region was approximately 630,000 inhabitants, representing 44% of the total population of the Russian Far East. The region was also the industrial heart of Primorye, accounting for 52% of total production. Many factories were initially private, though some were nationalized in 1923 and 1924. However, Moscow largely allowed the private sector to continue operating in the region for a longer period, as this was one of the few areas in Russia where the Civil War had not resulted in widespread destruction. Foreign private capital played a central role in the economy, with 66% of businesses owned by foreigners, the vast majority being Chinese. Mixed companies and concessions were established, particularly in the mining sector. By the 1920s, nearly 58% of enterprises were privately owned.

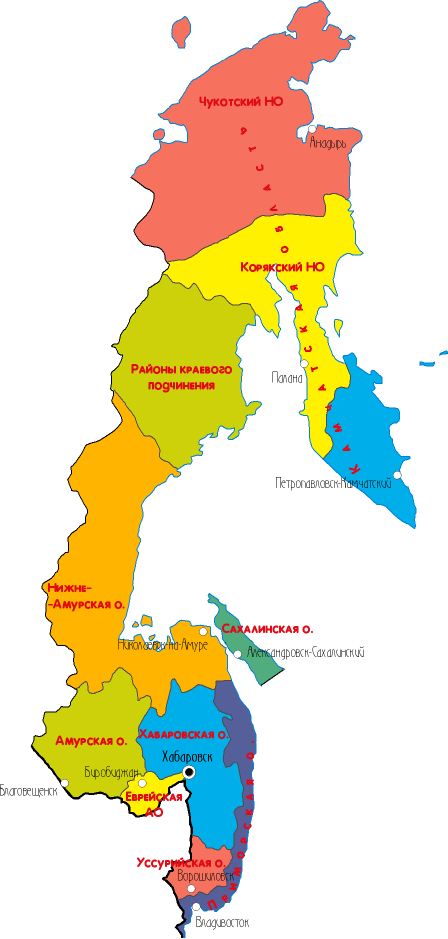
Far Eastern Krai in 1938.

On January 4, 1926, the Far Eastern Oblast was dissolved and replaced by the Far Eastern Krai. On October 20, 1932, Primorye Oblast was created, still within the Far Eastern Krai. In 1929, a Sino-Soviet conflict took place in neighboring Manchuria, resulting in a victory for the Red Army.

===== Stalinist policies in Primorye =====
In the early 1930s, with the end of the New Economic Policy, nationalization extended to all enterprises, effectively banning private and foreign capital. Concessions were also significantly reduced. The state took over the private sector through subsidies, particularly in transportation, mining, forestry, shipbuilding, and fishing. To support this effort, Red Army soldiers and their families were relocated to the Far East.

Forced labor was also widely used through the gulag system, including the Dallag, Far East (Dalnevostochny lager) that operated the Artyom mine, and the Vladperpunkt transit camp of Dalstroy in Vladivostok. By 1937, there were 70,000 prisoners in Primorye. Additionally, mass expulsions took place that year, affecting around 200,000 people, primarily Koreans and Chinese. The Great Purge also took a heavy toll on the region, with 9,000 victims.

===== Formation of Primorye Krai =====
On October 20, 1938, by decree of the Presidium of the Supreme Soviet, the Far Eastern Krai was dissolved, and its territory was divided into multiple regions, including Primorsky Krai. By 1939, the population had risen to 906,805, with the urban population surpassing the rural population, making it one of the most urbanized regions in Russia at the time.

==== Land collectivization ====
===== Characteristics of Primorye before collectivization =====
Like the rest of the Soviet Union, Primorye experienced the "scissors crisis" in 1923, followed by an agricultural and grain distribution crisis between 1927 and 1928. These events prompted Joseph Stalin to abandon the New Economic Policy and initiate land collectivization in 1929.

Before collectivization, Primorye was characterized by a significant number of wealthy households, often agricultural families. Korean communities and former Cossacks owned the most land and frequently maintained ties with White Russians living across the border in Manchuria. These groups were labeled as "kulaks" and considered enemies of the state by Stalin. The authorities used the collectivization process to dispossess not only the wealthier landowners but also small-scale farmers, including those living in poverty.

===== Beginning of collectivization and initial consequences =====
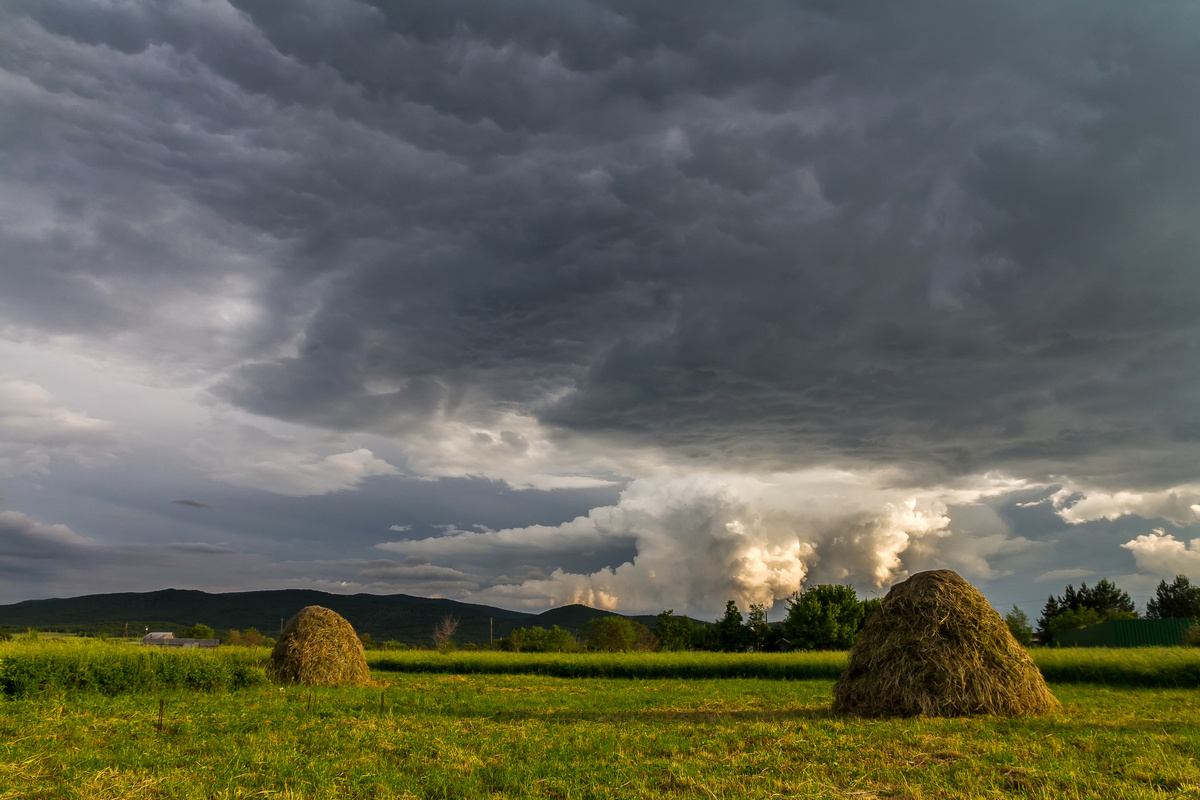
Field in the Chernigovka district.

Collectivization began in January, starting with the city of Vladivostok and the districts of Mikhaïlovka, Tchernigovka, and Grodekovo. (Note: Today known as the Anuchino District (Raion).) In these areas, 47% of farms were owned by kulaks, the highest proportions in Primorye. In February, the district of Shkotovsky joined the movement, and by that month, 70% of the land in Grodekovo had already been collectivized. Across the region, between January and March, the collectivization rate increased from 8.8% to 45%, and by early April, 40% of medium-sized farms were controlled by kolkhozes. On average, 10 to 15% of the population in Primorye was affected by this dispossession, with some areas reaching 25 to 30%. In Novonejino (Chkotovo district), 23.5% of the population was impacted, with even worse conditions in the Khanka Plain region. In the Spassk district, 378 farms were seized, and these dispossessions, combined with arrests, led to a massive exodus. 60% of Koreans living in Chkotovo district left, as did 45% in Tchernigovka. Peasant uprisings occurred, with some farmers retreating to the hills to fight in armed resistance. By February 1930, there were already 12 insurgent groups comprising 1,300 people in the Far Eastern Territory. (Note: This territory primarily included Primorye and Khabarovsk Krai, but also, to a much lesser extent, Magadan Oblast, Kamchatka, northern Sakhalin, and Chukotka.) In response to this resistance, which threatened to devastate regional agriculture, the authorities reversed some of their decisions; 46% (993 out of 2,148) of the farms in Grodekovo district withdrew from the kolkhoz system, and in Mikhaïlovka district, 365 out of 438 appeals were approved. As a result, between April 1 and July 1, 1930, the number of collectivized farms in Primorye dropped from 45% to 23%.

However, the authorities did not give up, and in the autumn of 1930, a new phase of collectivization began. This time, they were supported by the poor, political activists, and agricultural workers who favored collectivization against the kulaks. At the same time, the authorities established collective farms to resettle Red Army soldiers and their families. As a result, six Red Army kolkhozes were created in the Vladivostok district in the spring of 1930, and by 1932, there were 42 such farms in the Far Eastern Territory. Collectivization led to a decline in agricultural production, which was further exacerbated by large-scale floods in 1932 that devastated crops and caused famines. Nevertheless, collectivization continued, and by 1933, there were 619 collective farms in Primorye, along with 23 machine-tractor stations and 30 state farms (sovkhozes). By that time, 56% of agricultural enterprises and 80% of farmland had already been collectivized. To boost productivity, the authorities decided to involve the Red Army through specialized labor units to assist the farms.

===== Repressions, deportations, and purges: Impact on Primorye =====
Collectivization was accompanied by purges from the early 1930s, with the involvement of the OGPU. Between March and May 1933, 1,262 people and 265 collective farms were affected—210 individuals were removed from their positions, 80 were put on trial, 147 were expelled from farms, and one person was reprimanded. However, these figures only account for directors and other administrative staff. In the first half of 1933, 400,000 people were subjected to repression by the OGPU, the police, or other judicial bodies. Over the year, 15% of kolkhoz directors were dismissed from their positions. Between 1933 and 1934, the authorities also carried out purges targeting kulaks in Primorye, primarily among the Cossack population. For instance, 16% of the population of the Grodekovo district was expelled, as well as 33% of the residents of the village of Salskoye (Iman district). As a result, the rural population of Primorye plummeted, decreasing by a factor of 2.5 in the Grodekovo district.

In the autumn of 1937, 180,000 Koreans, the vast majority of whom were farmers, along with other populations, were arrested and deported to Central Asia, including Kazakhstan. Between 1937 and 1939, nearly one-fifth of the regional population was expelled, in addition to the 9,000 people executed between August 1937 and November 1938 alone. With Stalinist purges, half of the directors of Machine and Tractor Stations (MTS) were removed from their positions, and some were sent to the gulags. Collectivization destroyed the preexisting system by impoverishing and repressing the kulaks, while also disrupting the traditional way of life and the functioning of villages.

===== Completion of collectivization in Primorye =====
Collectivization in Primorye was completed by the end of the Second Five-Year Plan in 1938. By that time, 99.5% of cultivated land and 93% of farms had been consolidated into collective farms. By 1941, Primorye had 502 collective farms, 45 state farms, and 45 machine and tractor stations, which owned more than 5,000 agricultural vehicles. Unlike other regions, Primorye had twice as many agricultural vehicles per hectare because machines had been almost nonexistent before land collectivization.

To support these new farms, the state encouraged immigration to the region. Between 1939 and 1941 alone, 34,500 farmers settled in Primorye. By 1941, a total of 128,800 people were working in kolkhozes. The region now had 322,000 hectares of farmland, where cereals, vegetables, potatoes, and sugar beets were cultivated. However, livestock farming remained limited, primarily focused on cattle for meat and dairy production.

==== World War II ====
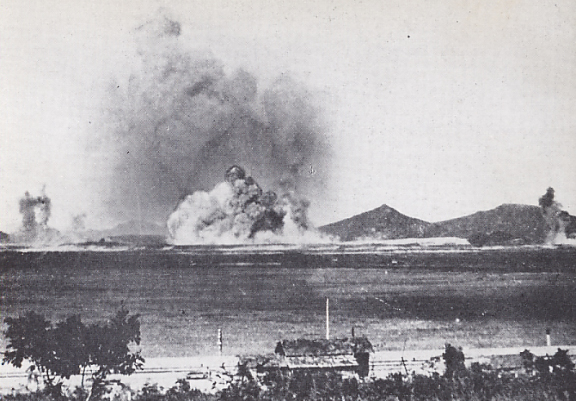
Explosion during the battle of Lake Khasan.

On July 29, 1938, amid the ongoing Second Sino-Japanese War, a conflict erupted between Soviet Russia and Japan over Manchuria, which was under Japanese control. This resulted in the Battle of Lake Khasan. The battle led to more than 1,500 casualties on both sides, with the Soviets emerging victorious. The conflict ended on August 11, 1938, prompting the militarization of the border in a region where the Soviet Pacific Fleet was stationed.

Although Primorye remained far from the main battlefronts, its industrial production accelerated as part of the war effort to supply the front lines. During the war, Vladivostok became the primary Soviet port, as those in Europe were blocked by the Nazis. Martial law in the Russian Far East, including Primorye, was lifted on August 31, 1945, allowing for economic recovery.

==== Economic growth from 1945 to 1991 ====
After World War II, Primorye's economy resumed its development as an industrial and agricultural hub in the Russian Far East. The region saw the emergence of coal mines, numerous factories, and power plants. In transportation, the port of Vladivostok was renovated, while in the 1970s and 1980s, the port of Nakhodka was built, becoming one of Russia's most important ports. Around the same time, the Vostochny Port was also established near Nakhodka. On September 15, 1948, by decree of the Presidium of the Supreme Soviet, the Sovetskaya Gavan district was transferred to Khabarovsk Krai.

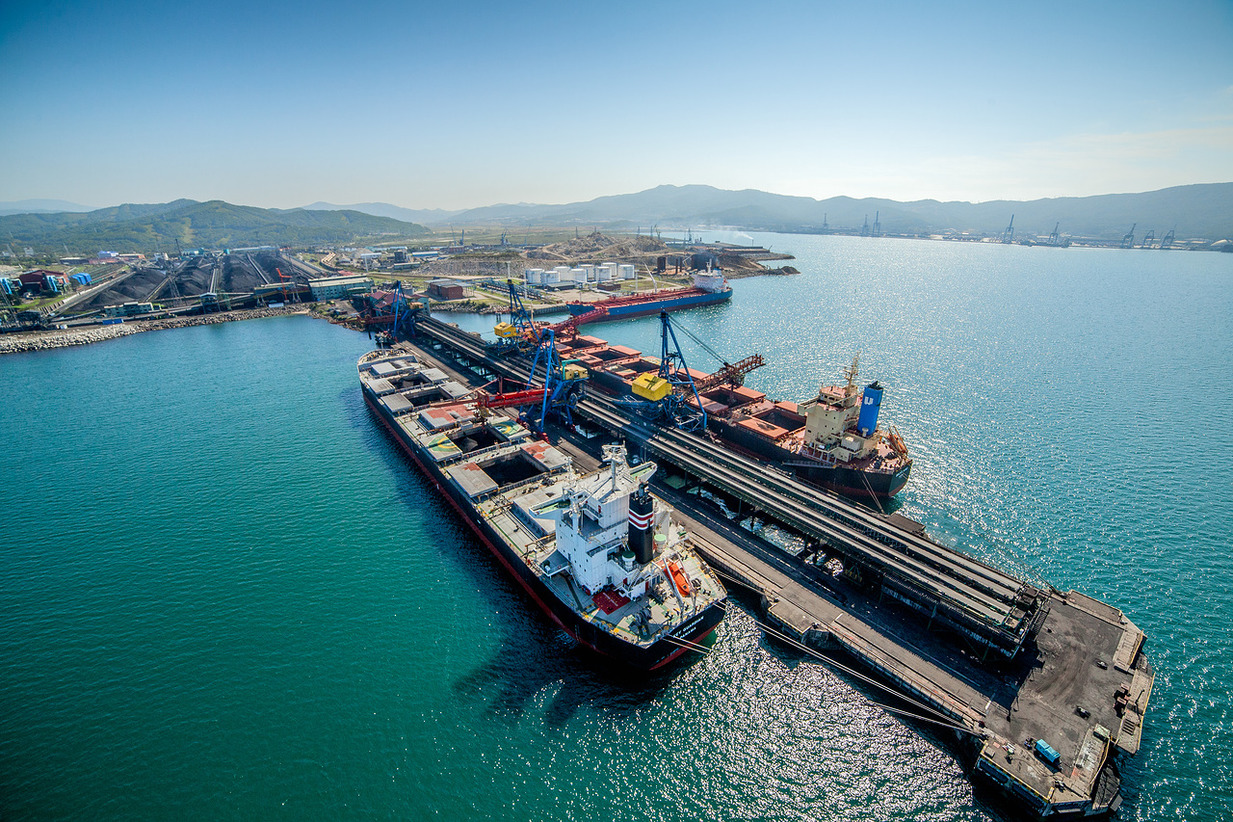
Part of Vostochny port.

During the 1950s, rapid housing construction began in Primorye, coinciding with a population boom. When Nikita Khrushchev, First Secretary of the Communist Party of the Soviet Union, visited Primorye in 1953, he ordered that Vladivostok should become "a better city than San Francisco." Through centralized planning, new economic sectors were developed, including furniture manufacturing, chemical production, instrument-making, and porcelain production. However, agriculture remained insufficient to meet the region's needs, requiring imports from other areas. By the early 1970s, Primorye was one of the most open regions in the Russian Far East, exporting its products to more than 50 countries.

In 1969, the Sino-Soviet border conflict over Zhenbao (Damansky) Island took place, ending in a Soviet victory. In 1970, the Far Eastern branch of the Soviet Academy of Sciences (now the Russian Academy of Sciences) was established. In November 1974, Vladivostok hosted an arms control summit between U.S. President Gerald Ford and Soviet leader Leonid Brezhnev, laying the groundwork for the SALT II agreement. On October 21, 1981, the submarine S-178 sank in Peter the Great Gulf after a collision with a ship, resulting in the deaths of 32 people.

During this period, significant migration from Siberia and European Russia increased the population from 1,381,018 in 1959 to 2,258,391 in 1989. Urban centers benefited the most, experiencing major development in the region's key cities.

=== After the collapse of the Soviet Union (1991–present) ===
==== Opening to foreigners ====
With the economic liberalization brought about by perestroika, Primorye experienced a significant increase in trade with its neighboring countries. Between 1990 and 1996, the number of the region's foreign trade partners grew from 17 to 84. Moreover, the number of transnational enterprises in Primorye rose from 350 in 1993 to 3,000 in the same year. By 1994, more than 600 companies were joint ventures, primarily with China (271), Japan (52), and the United States (39). By 1995, Primorye led Russia in the rate of privatized enterprises. In 1996, foreign companies were already generating over 1 trillion rubles in production and creating more than 10,000 jobs. Imports also shifted, with the share of foreign goods increasing from less than 25% to over 56% by 1994.

The connections were not only economic but also cultural. The Far Eastern Federal University in Vladivostok strengthened its ties with universities across the Asia-Pacific region during the 1990s. By the late 1990s, it had signed more than sixty agreements with universities in Japan, China, Australia, New Zealand, Taiwan, and South Korea, among others. Additionally, in 1992, Vladivostok was officially opened to the public. Previously, it had been a closed city due to its military significance.

==== Establishment of regional political institutions ====
In October 1994, as part of the democratization process following the adoption of the 1993 Russian Constitution, the Legislative Assembly of Primorye Krai was elected. The following year, in December 1995, the first governor of the krai, Vladimir Kuznetsov, was elected. Also in 1995, Primorye adopted its official flag and coat of arms and designated October 25 as Primorye Day.

==== 21st century ====
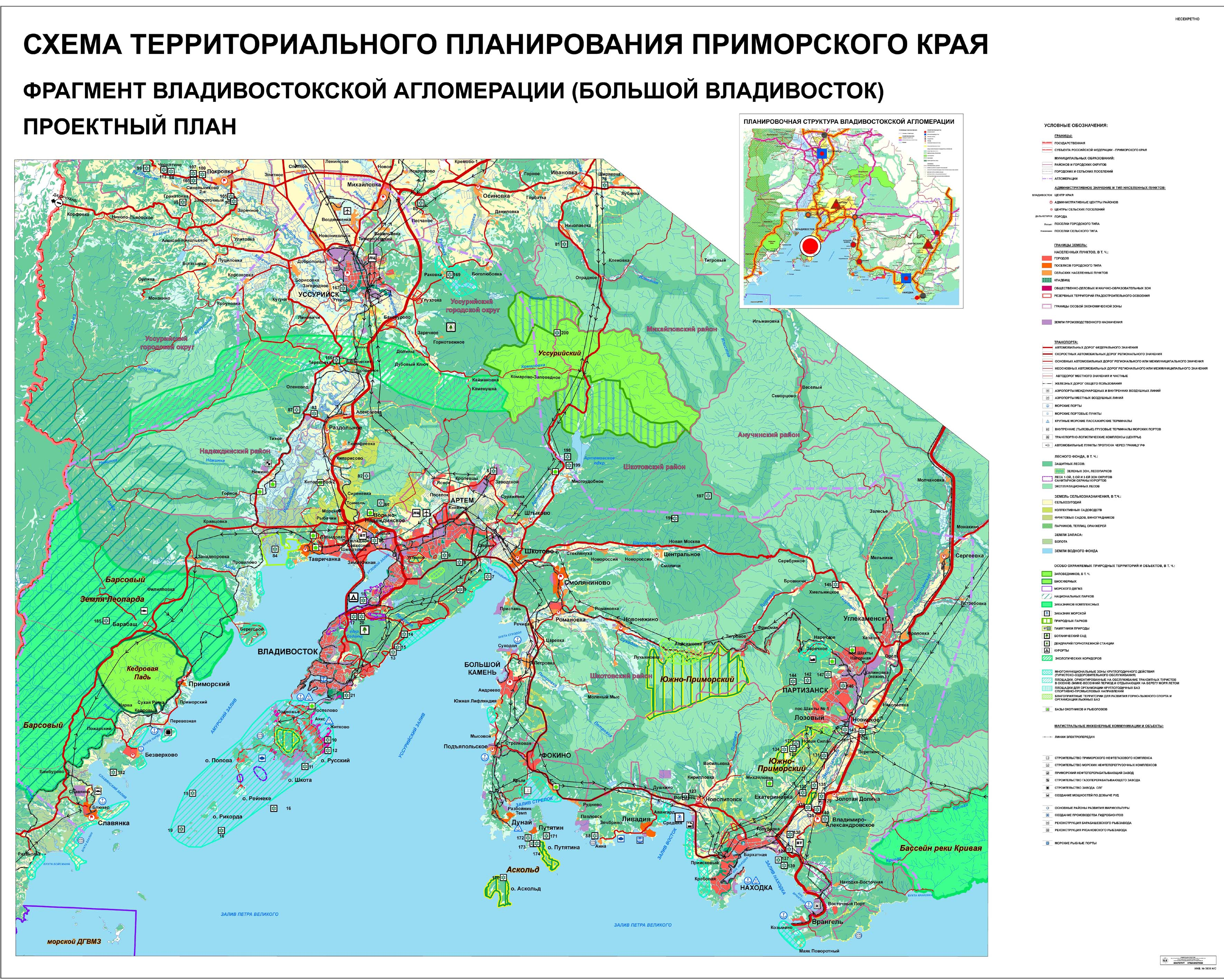
Map of the urban development plan for the Vladivostok agglomeration

Vladivostok hosted the APEC summit in 2012, which led to extensive infrastructure development in the city. Projects included a new terminal for Vladivostok International Airport, as well as the construction of major bridges such as the Amur Bay Bridge, the Golden Horn Bridge, and the Russky Island Bridge. Additionally, the De Vries–Patrokl–Russky Island Highway was built to bypass Vladivostok. At the time of its inauguration, the Russky Island Bridge had the longest cable-stayed span in the world, measuring 1,104 meters between its two pylons. In 2015, the port of Vladivostok was designated a free port to attract investors and boost trade.

New infrastructure built for APEC 2012

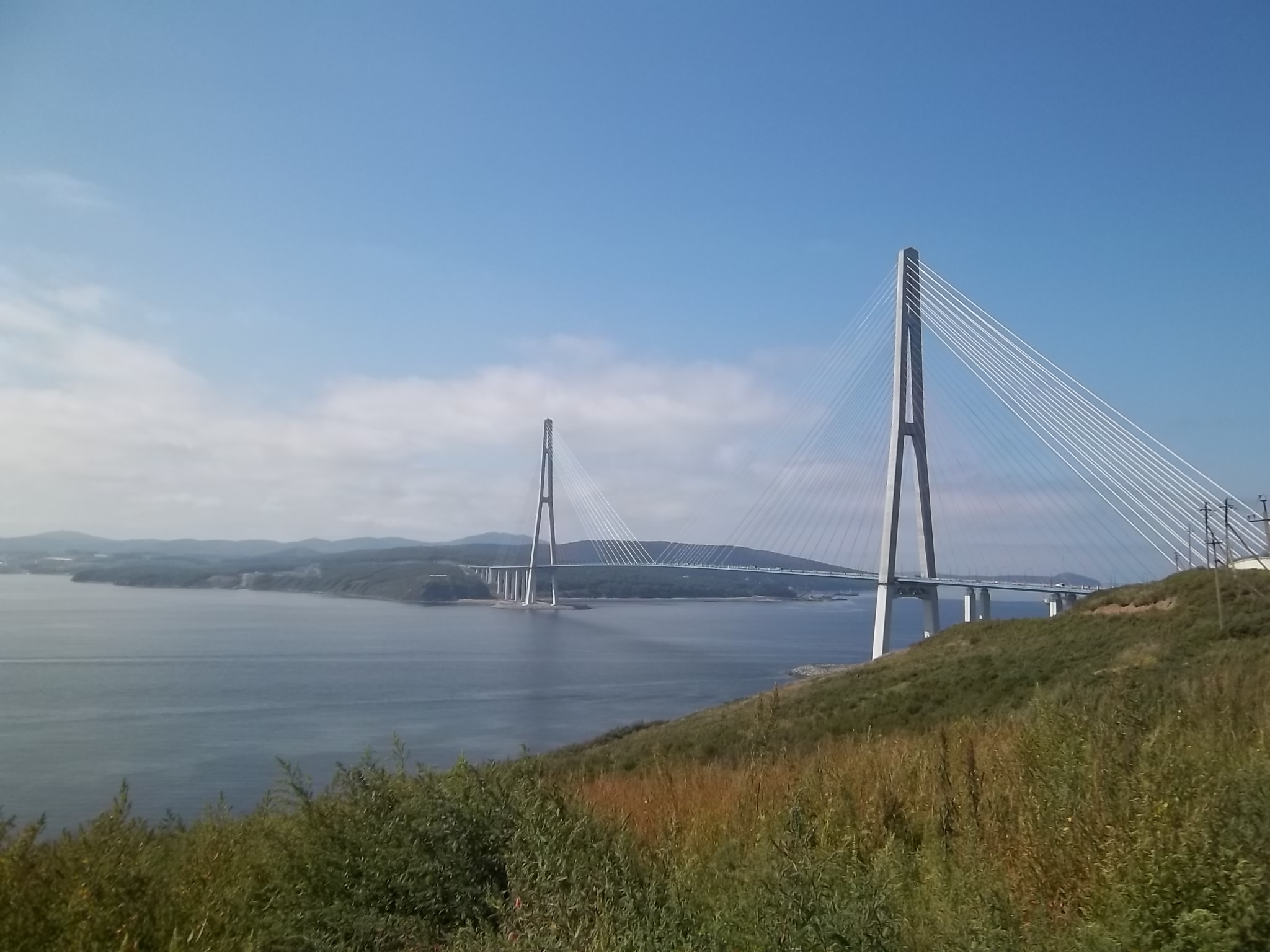
Bridge on Russky Island crossing the Eastern Bosphorus.

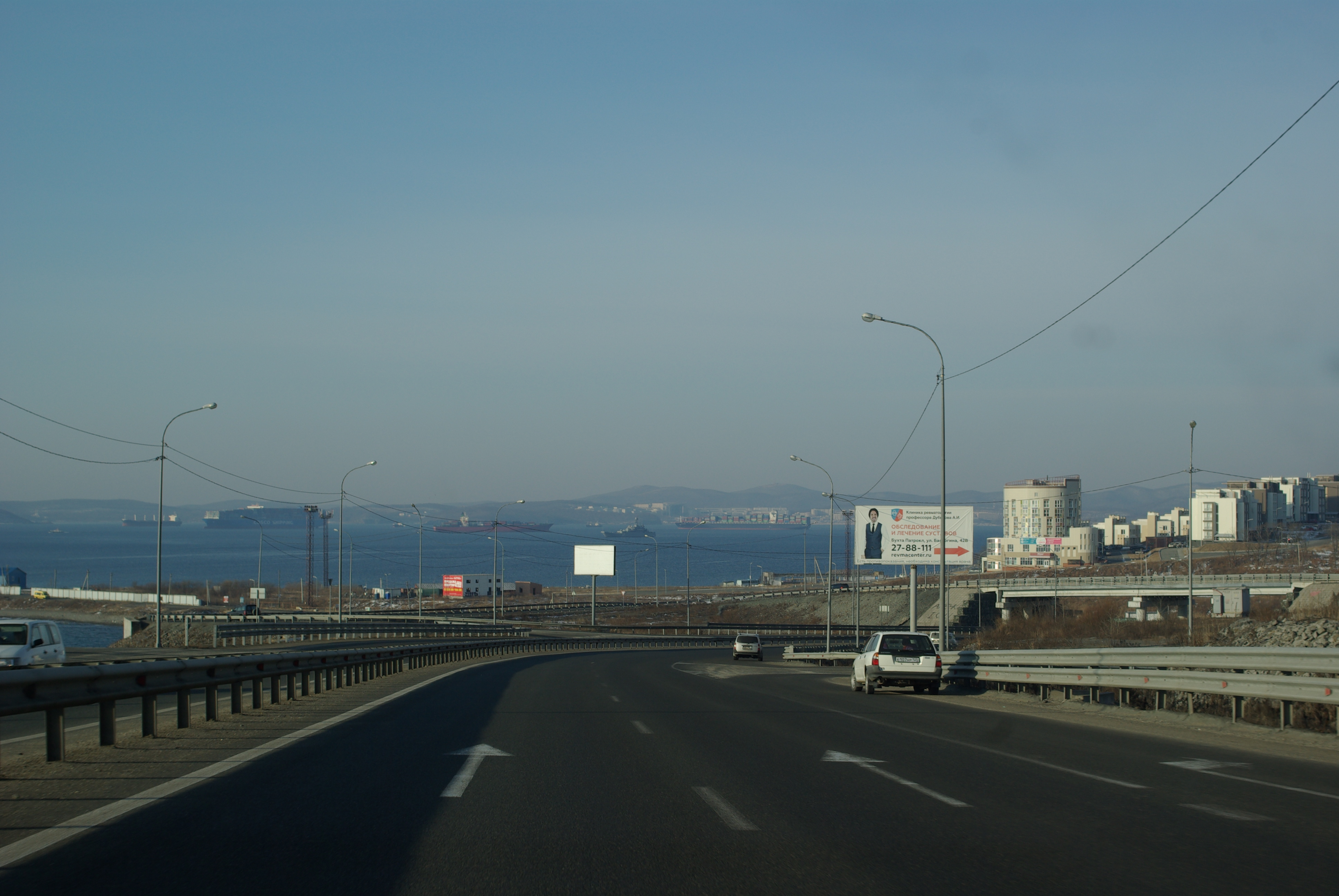
De Vries - Sedanka - Patrokl motorway.

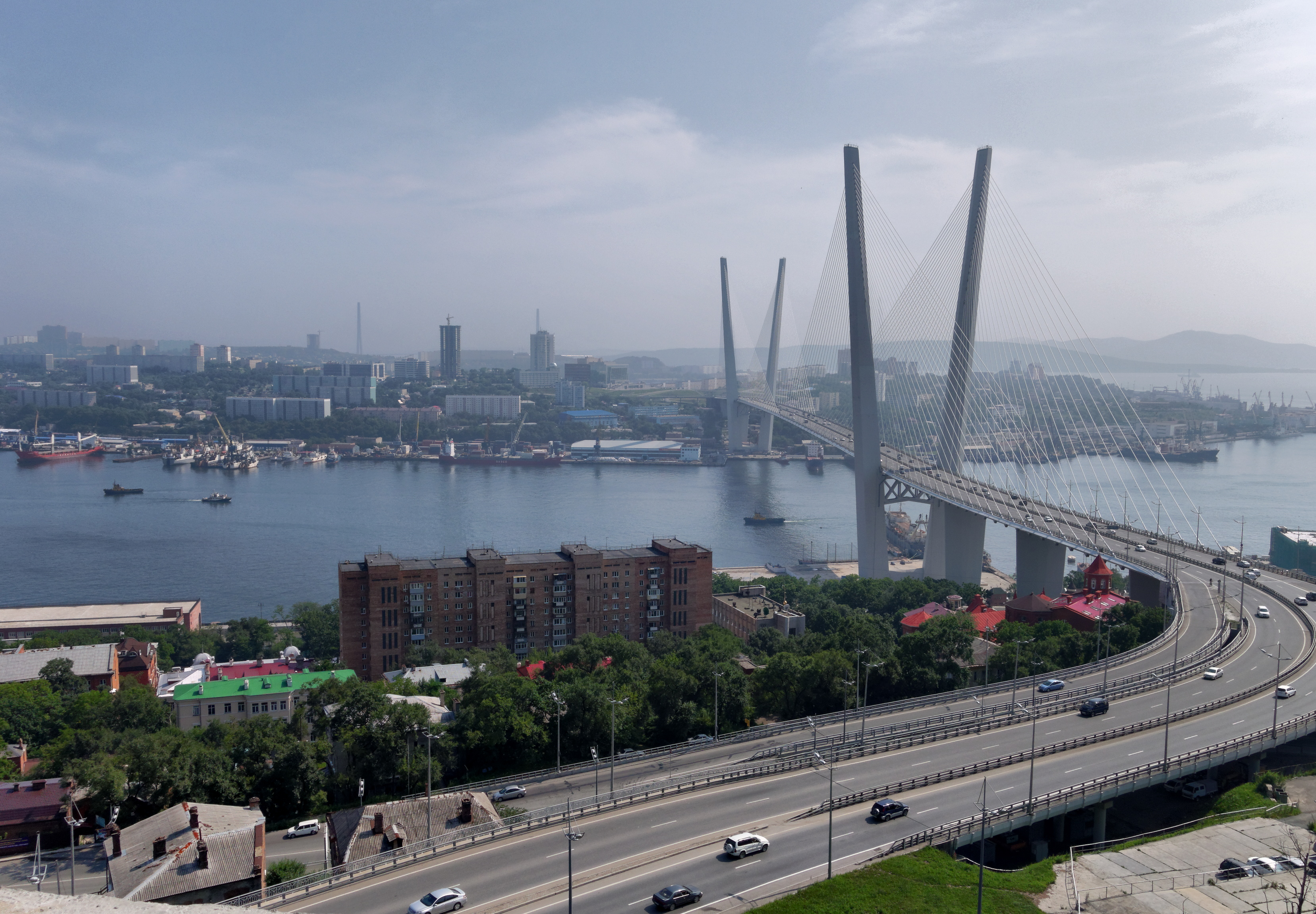
Bridge over the Golden Horn spanning the Zolotoy Rog.

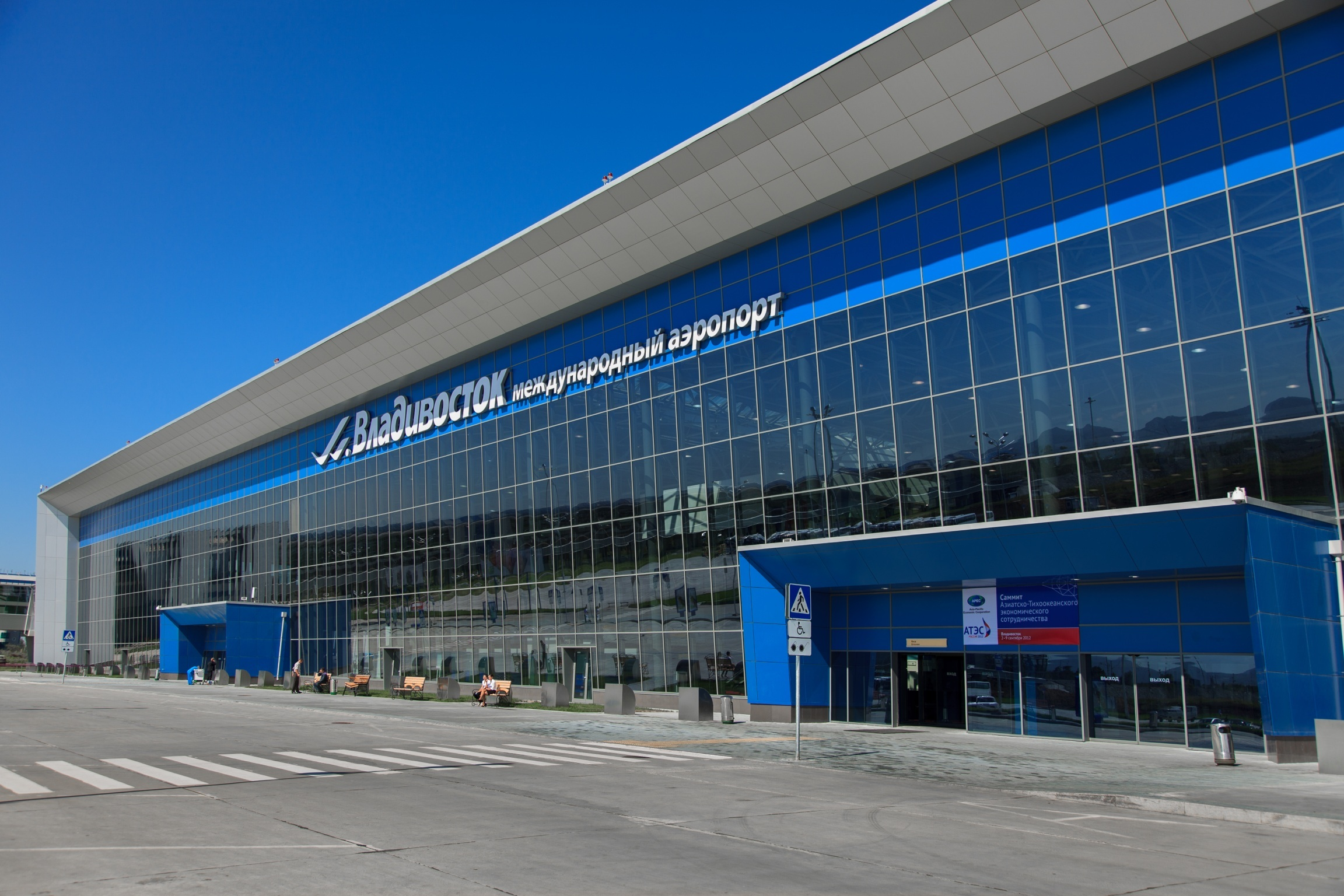
New terminal at Vladivostok International Airport

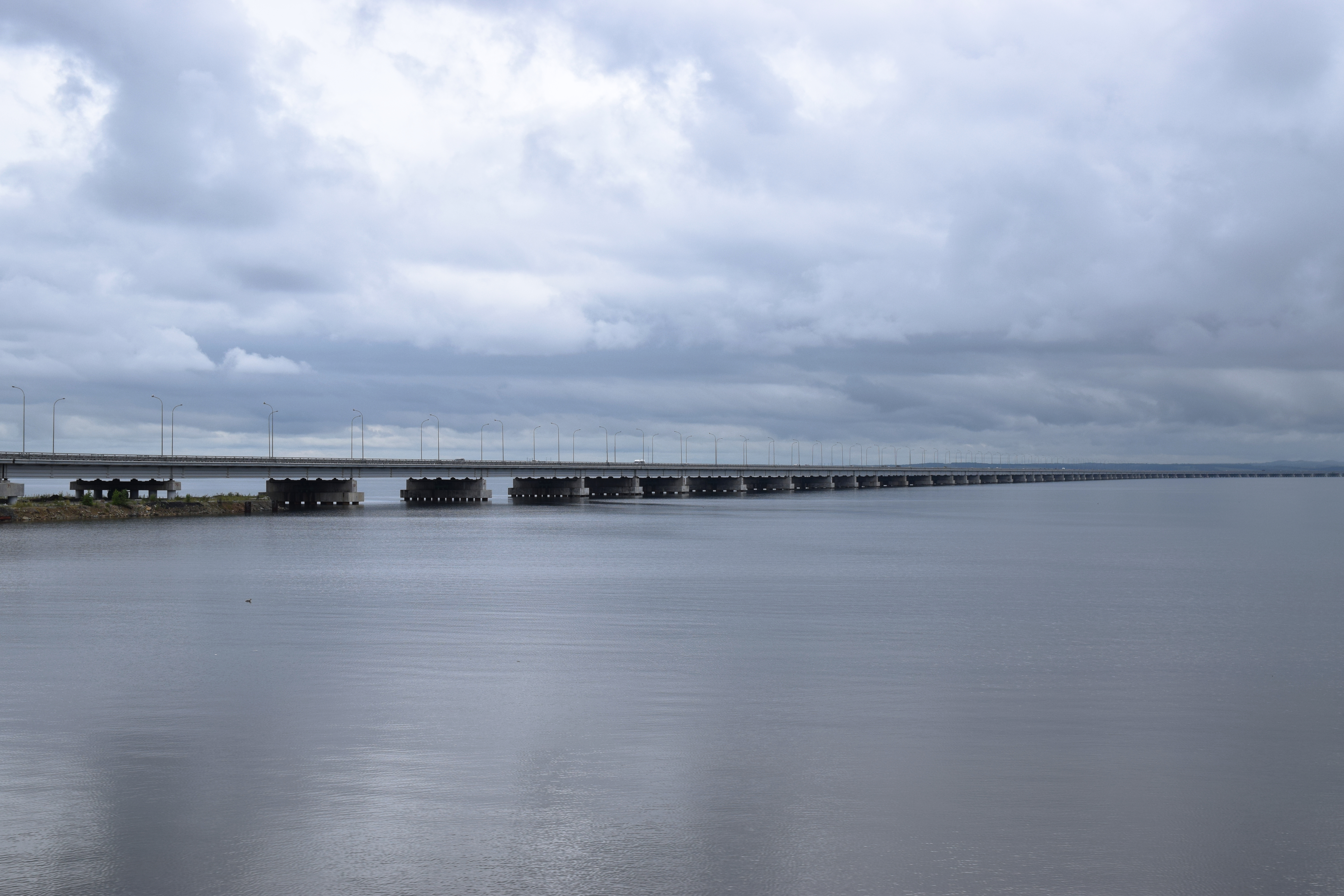
Bridge over the Bay of Love.

At the beginning of the 21st century, Primorye faced significant demographic and economic decline. Between 1989 and 2021, the region lost over 413,000 people, though the decline was less severe compared to other parts of the Russian Far East, such as Magadan Oblast. This mass exodus has slowed economic development; in 2017, it was estimated that one in five working-age individuals in the region's cities was unemployed. One major reason for this outmigration is the high cost of living. As of 2017, prices in Primorye were on average 30% to 50% higher than in European Russia, and Vladivostok ranked among the five most expensive cities in the country.

The authorities are focusing on revitalizing Primorye by developing the mining industry and, above all, transforming the region into a logistical hub. In 2018, the ports of the krai handled 200 million tons of freight, accounting for a quarter of Russia's total freight traffic. The most significant ports were Vostochny (77.7 million tons in 2021), Vladivostok (29.6 million tons in 2021), and Nakhodka (26.8 million tons in 2021). Fishing is also a key sector for the region, though the regional government faces foreign pressures regarding fishing quotas. More broadly, Primorye remains in competition with South Korea and its economic advantages. However, some industries benefit from this proximity, such as tourism, which saw a fivefold increase in the number of visitors—mostly from China—between 2013 and 2017. Additionally, Primorye receives substantial subsidies from Moscow for infrastructure projects, including the construction and renovation of roads, gas pipelines, cultural institutions, and tourist zones.

In December 2018, the governor of the krai convinced President Vladimir Putin to transfer the capital of the Far Eastern Federal District from Khabarovsk to Vladivostok. The two cities, which have roughly the same population, have long been rivals for the status of the largest city in the Russian Far East. The transfer brought numerous administrative jobs to Vladivostok, boosting its economic development at the expense of Khabarovsk.

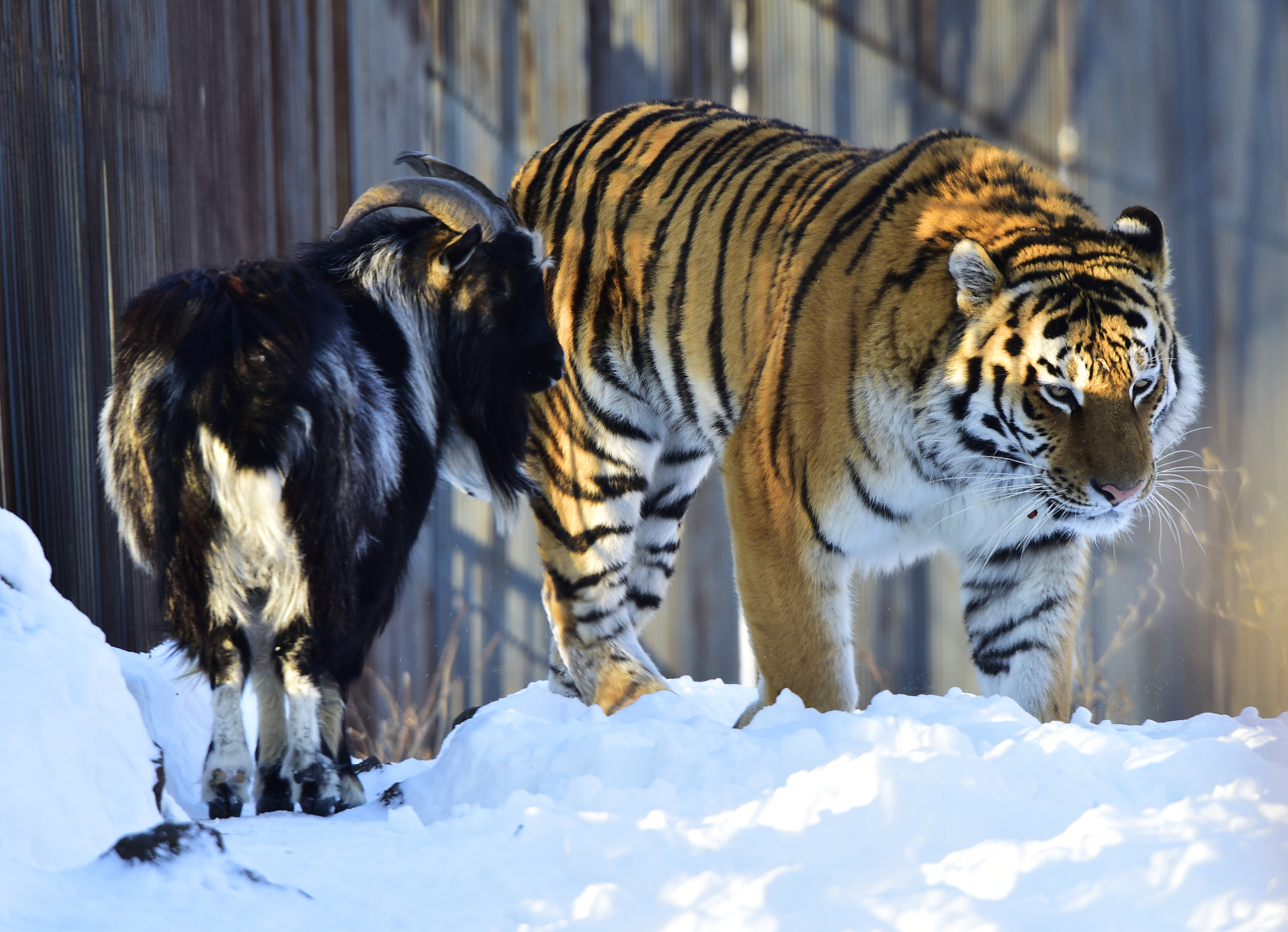
Amour (the tiger) and Timour (the goat): two animals who have developed a friendship.

Beyond economic concerns, Primorye must also protect its rare natural environment. The region is home to two-thirds of the 600 Amur tigers living in Russia, a remarkable recovery from just 30 individuals at the beginning of the 20th century. However, deforestation continues to shrink their habitat, while the constant expansion of the road network increases opportunities for poaching. By 2021, it was estimated that poachers had access to about 52% of the taiga, the tigers' primary habitat. The poached tigers are then smuggled into neighboring China. Vladimir Putin has publicly supported efforts to protect and reintroduce the species.

Following Russia's invasion of Ukraine and the subsequent sanctions, the country and its regions had to seek alternative markets. Despite the war, the volume of goods transported between Heilongjiang and Primorye increased by 70% in the first half of 2022 compared to 2021, according to Chinese customs data. However, the sanctions have also impacted the region, particularly in the transportation sector. For example, the planned highway from Vladivostok to Nakhodka will not be fully completed; only the section to Bolshoy Kamen will be built, while the rest of the project has been canceled due to a lack of funds. Additionally, many areas in northern Primorye rely on air travel for connectivity, but with sanctions restricting aircraft maintenance, domestic air traffic had already been reduced by half by early 2023.

== See also ==
=== Articles about krai ===
- Primorsky Krai
- Geography of Primorsky Krai

=== Articles concerning historical periods ===
- Jin dynasty (1115–1234)
- Liao dynasty
- Primorskaya Oblast
- Russian Civil War

=== General articles ===
- History of Manchuria
- History of Russia
- History of China
- Collective farming
- Soviet Union

== Bibliography ==
=== General works ===
- Plokhikh, S.V; Kovaleva, Z.A (2002). История Дальнего Востока России [History of the Russian Far East] (in Russian). Vladivostok: Publishing house of the Federal University of the Far East.
- Petchenkina, V.A (2005). Краеведение. Приморский край [Local history. Primorsky Krai] (in Russian). Vladivostok: Publishing house of the Federal University of the Far East. Archived from the original on November 23, 2023.
- Iourievna Strelova, Olga; Ibragimovna Romanova, Marina (2020). История Дальнего Востока России в древности и Средневековье [History of the Russian Far East in Antiquity and the Middle Ages] (PDF) (in Russian). Archived from the original (PDF) on February 25, 2023.

=== Books and articles centered on a period ===
- Lepper, Bradley T (2000). CURRENT RESEARCH IN THE PLEISTOCENE (PDF). Vol. 17. Corvallis, Oregon: Center for the Study of the First Americans (Oregon State University).
- Popov, Alexander N; Zhushchikhovskaya, Irina S; Nikitin, Yuri G (2020). "Paleometal Epoch in the Primorye (south of the Far East of Russia)". World Archaeology. 51 (5): 382–407. doi:10.1080/00438243.2019.1722737. ISSN 0043-8243.
- Diakova, Ольга Vassilievna (2015). "Население Приморья России в XVI-XVII вв" [Population of the Russian Primorye in the 16th–17th centuries]. Общество И Государство В Китае (in Russian). 45 (2): 619–624.
- Williams, Albert Rhys (1921). Through The Russian Revolution. New York: Boni and Liveright.
- House, John M; Curzon, Daniel P (2019). THE RUSSIAN EXPEDITIONS 1917–1920. Washington, D.C: United States Army Center of Military History.
- Karpov, A.A (2018). Озеро Хасан -1938 г. из истории Хасанских боев [Lake Khassan - 1938 in the history of the Battle of Khassan] (in Russian). Musée régional de Khassan.
- Lyashchevskaya, Marina S; Bazarova, Valentina B; Dorofeeva, Nataliya A; Leipe, Christian (2022). "Late Pleistocene–Holocene environmental and cultural changes in Primorye, southern Russian Far East: A review". Quaternary International. 623: 68–82. doi:10.1080/00438243.2019.1722710.1016/j.quaint.2022.02.01037 (inactive 14 November 2026). ISSN 1040-6182.

=== Books and articles centered on a theme ===
- Sergoucheva, I.A (2007). "Раннее земледелие в Приморье" [The beginnings of agriculture in Primorye]. Вестник Дальневосточного Отделения Российской Академии Наук (in Russian) (3): 116–120. ISSN 0869-7698.
- Borourouïeva, Anna Alexandrovna (2021). "Новые средневековые материалы из окрестноcтей с. Сергеевка (Партизанский район Приморского края)" [New medieval materials from the vicinity of the village of Sergueïevka (Partizansk district of Primorsky Krai)]. Мультидисциплинарные Исследования В Археологии (in Russian) (2): 165–178. ISSN 2658-3550.
- Marsone, Pierre (2022). "Histoire et cultures de la Chine (Xe-XIVe s.)" [History and cultures of China (10th-14th-15th-16th c.)]. Annuaire de l'École pratique des hautes études (EPHE), Section des sciences historiques et philologiques (in French) (153): 472–497. ISSN 0766-0677.
- Ievmeniev, Alexandre Alexandrovitch (2014). АМУРСКИЕ ЧЖУРЧЖЭНИ ЗОЛОТАЯ ИМПЕРИЯ (КРОВАВАЯ РОСА) [Jürchens of Love / Empire of Gold (Bloody Dew)] (in Russian).
- Kradin, Nikolay (2020). "Far-Eastern Gardariki: Urban Archaeology Heritage of Jurchen Empire in Primorye Region of Russia". Istoriya (in French). 11 (97): 472–497. doi:10.18254/S207987840012774-0. ISSN 2079-8784.
- Bachkeïeva, Svetlana; Kradine, Nikolaï (2018). Towns of the Mediaeval Empires of the Far East/Города средневековых империй Дальнего Востока (in Russian). Moscow: Oriental Literature, Institute of History, Archeology and Ethnography of the Peoples of the Far East of the Far Eastern Branch of the Academy of Sciences of Russia. ISBN 978-5-6041860-1-5.
- Sidorenko, A.V; Sidorenko, M.A (2019). "Исторические этапы заселения Приморского края русскими переселенцами" [Historical stages of the colonization of the Primorsky Krai by Russian settlers]. Инновационная Наука (in Russian) (2): 54–55. ISSN 2410-6070.
- Основной закон (Конституция) Дальневосточной республики [Basic Law (Constitution) of the Republic of the Far East] (in Russian). 1921.
- Fiodorvitch Startsev, Anatoli (2012). "Исторические и современные реалии социально-экономического развития аборигенов Приморского края и их будущее" [Historical and modern realities of the socio-economic development of the aborigines of the Primorsky Krai and their future]. Ойкумена. Регионоведческие Исследования (in Russian). 1 (20): 92–99. ISSN 1998-6785.
- Charles, Florent (2015). La question coréenne et le problème de la réunification [The Korean question and the problem of reunification] (in French). Université Nice-Sophia-Antipolis.
