= Ushi Island =

Island in Peter the Great Gulf, Russia, part of Eugénie Archipelago

Ushi
Native name: Уши
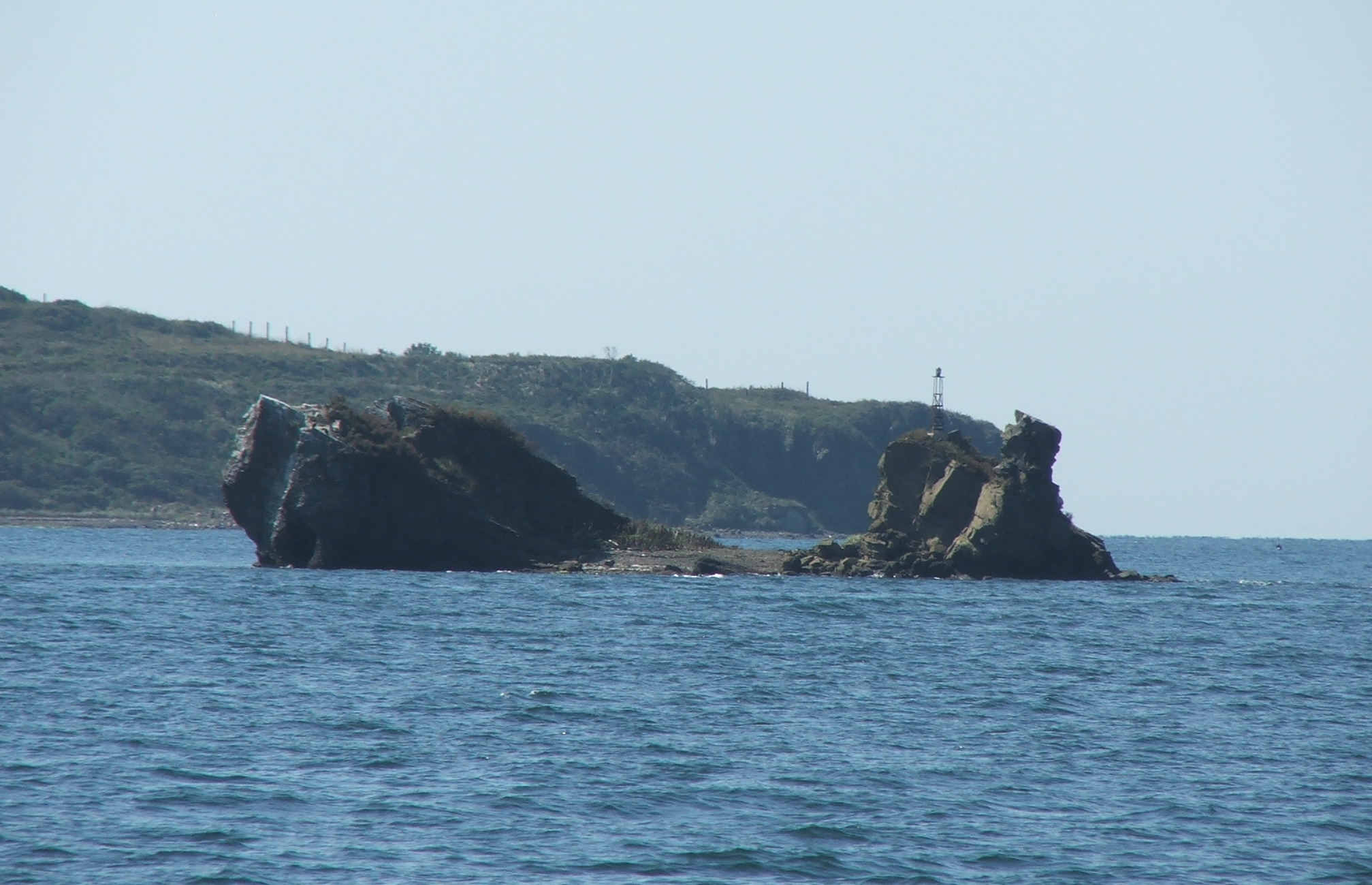
- Interactive map of Ushi

Geography
- Location: Sea of Japan
- Coordinates: 43°03′48″N 131°48′11″E
- Archipelago: Eugénie Archipelago
- Total islands: 1
- Area: 0.001 km^{2} (0.00039 sq mi)
- Highest elevation: 6 m (20 ft)

Administration
- Russia
- Vladivostok, Primorsky Krai

Demographics
- Population: 0

Ushi Island (Russian: Остров Уши) is an islet in the Eugénie Archipelago within the Peter the Great Gulf of the Sea of Japan. It is administratively part of the city of Vladivostok in Primorsky Krai, Russia. The uninhabited island is located 160 metres (520 feet) north-west of Russky Island, in the Amur Bay section of the gulf along the southern coast of Primorsky Krai. The area of Ushi island is 0.1 hectares (0.25 acres), with dimensions of about 45 by 22 metres (148 by 72 feet), and its highest point is 6 metres (20 feet). It is almost devoid of vegetation, and consists of two rocks which connected narrow and low isthmus. There are shoals 4.8 to 5.2 metres (16–17 feet) near the island. It is a popular spot for fish and birds alike. Owing to its size however, only a limited number of birds can roost on the island.
