= Geography of Primorsky Krai =

Primorsky Krai is located in the southern far east, in the south-eastern part of Russia. In the north it borders with Khabarovsk Krai, in the west with the Chinese Provinces of Jilin and Heilongjiang, in the south-west with North Korea (Special City of Rason) and at the south-east with the Sea of Japan. The total length of the borders is 3,000 km (1,864 miles) and the coastline is 1,500 km (932 miles). The total area is 165,900 km^{2} (64,100 sq miles) which is 0.97% of the total area of Russia, which makes it 23rd largest federal subject of Russia. The total length of the krai is 900 km and the width is 280 km.

Primorsky Krai has been federal subject of the Russian SFSR and then of Russian Federation since 1991. The krai also had the numerous islands; including Russky Island, Popov Island, Rikord Island, Putyatin Island and others. The major physiographic regions of the Primorsky Krai are Sikotin-Alin (southern-half) and East Manchuria.

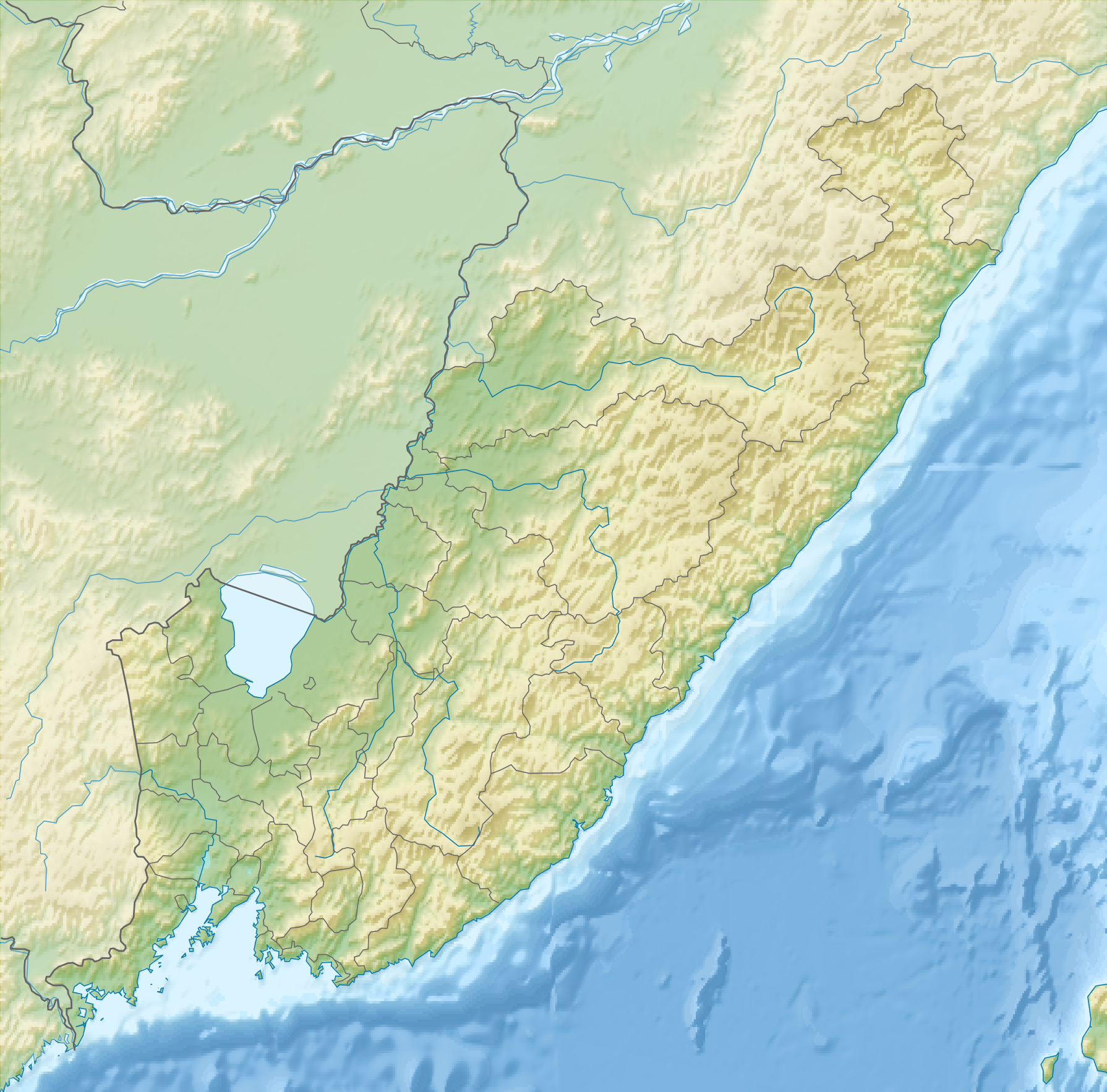
Relief map of Primorsky Krai

Primorsky Krai within the Russian Federation highlighted

Sikhote-Alin is a mountain range (maximum elevation: 500–1000 meters; relative elevations: 200–400 meters; absolute height: 1,855 meters). Mountain ranges with rounded peaks and gentle slopes, emphazing the wide development of dome structures here, extend as a whole subparallel with each other from south-west to the north-east till they entered in Khabarovsk Krai. They do not the snow line anywhere, but neat fields, sometimes of considerable size, are formed annually in snow inlet zones and persists until mid-summers. According to the main watershed, the Sikhote-Alin mountain region is divided into the Japanese Sea (eastern and southern) and Ussuri-Khanka (western) macroslopes, which differ from each other in the structure of the relief and natural and climatic factors. This is mainly caused by both the difference in geological and tectonic plan, and the predominant distribution on the eastern slope of circulation of wet humid air masses. The latter come from the Sea of Okhotsk and the Sea of Japan in the spring-early summer period, and in the autumn-winter period, on the contrary, relatively warm, but also humid air masses prevail.

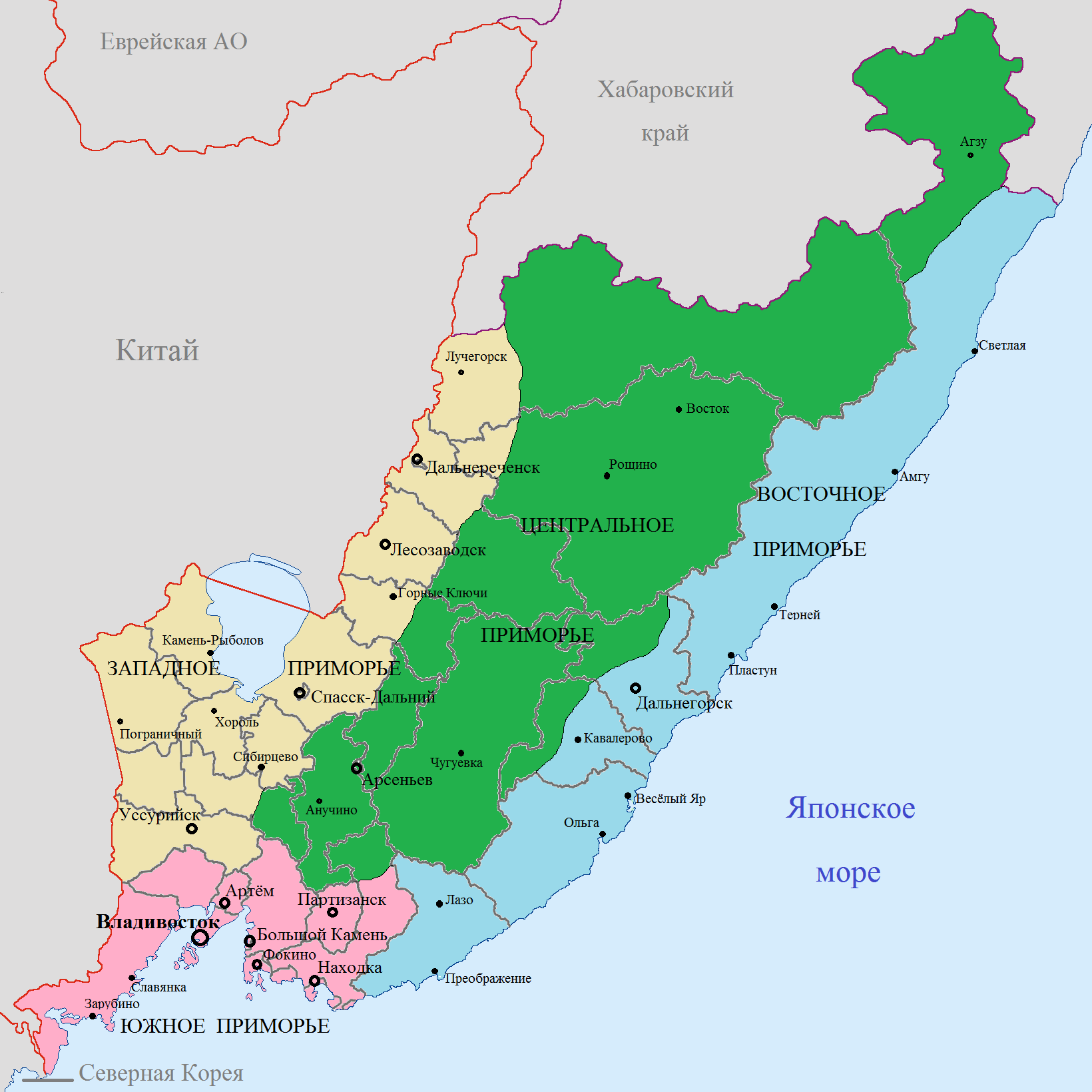
Primorsky Krai regions

In the northern part are Samarginskoe and Zevinskoe, and in the south Artyomovsk basalt plateaus. Within their limits, flat table -shaped watersheds are developed, where upland bogs are often formed in depressions. Large areas are covered with larch forests with peaty and peaty-gley overmoistened soils. The latter are formed on the areal and linear clay crusts of weathering. The marginal parts of the plateau are carved by narrow river valleys. Transverse ridges and river valleys, Subsequent large fault zones, the Japan Sea macro slope is divided into a series of independent natural-climatic complexes with sufficient contrast. Southern Sikhote-Alin is especially colorful due to its rugged coastline, rocky cliffs and gently sloping sandy beaches, the wealth of natural monuments, mild maritime climate, a neighborhood of an extensive transport network and high economic development with a natural, often not disturbed landscape. All this made southern Primorye a favorite place of recreation and tourism for residents of the entire Far East of Russia and other countries of the Asia-Pacific region.

The Ussuri-Khanka macro-slope is morphologically subdivided into Central and Western Sikhote-Alin. The mountain ranges of the Central Sikhote-Alin have mainly the direction of the CER, i.e. coinciding with the general direction of the folded structures and zones of ruptures. This part of the mountainous region is confined to the most elevated parts of the massive midland with absolute overtones up to 1850 m and elevations of 150–300 m. The rivers are steep, mountainous with rapids and shallows. The steepness of the slopes here is less than on the eastern macroslope, but the abundant-scree phenomena, erosion, landslides and solifluction are also quite intense. West Sikhote-Alin consists of separate ranges of the C-B stretch, separated by intermountain depressions and dissected by wide transverse river valleys of the Ussuri, Malinovka, B. Ussurka, Bikin and other rivers. The heights of the mountains rarely exceed 1000 m. relative elevations are 50–150 m, and the slopes are gentler, compared to Central Sikhote-Alin. At the foot of the ridges developed non-surface surfaces, composed of deluvial clays.

The East Manchurian Plateau enters the limits of the Primorsky Territory with its eastern component and is divided into three parts: Border and Khasan-Barabash mountain areas, as well as Borisov basalt plateau. The latter is largely similar to the Artyomovsky and other plateaus described above. But the border and Khasansky mountain areas - this is a typical lowland - hills. The border region is a system of low (absolute elevations - 600–800 m, relative -200-500 m) mountain ranges, which descend towards Lake Hassan, passing into a hilly-ravaged plain. At the same time, the orientation of the watersheds is often arcuate and radial relative to the center of the lake. Hassan; it emphasizes the form of the ring structure of the same name. In the Hasan-Barabash district, the absolute marks (900–1000 m) and relative elevations (300–600 m) are noticeably higher. The main mountain range "Black Mountains" arched to the Amur Bay. The valleys of most watercourses are open to the southern and southeastern moist sea winds, which leaves a peculiar imprint on climate, vegetation and soil. The river beds are overloaded with alluvium, the amount of which increases in the lower reaches due to the general stretching and subsidence of the Earth's crust along the edge of the continent, and due to the accumulation of catastrophic floods. As a result, a low-lying plain with a width of up to 10 km was formed on the coast. Over its flat marshy surface with many lakes and oxbows, remnant mountains up to 180 m high rise in places (Pigeon's Rock Mountain, etc.) rise in places by lakes and oxbows.

In the inner part of the West-Primorye Plain Region, the total area of which is 20% of the territory of the region, is Lake. Hanka Around it is the lowland of the same name - swampy lowland spaces (absolute elevations up to 200 m), separated by wide river valleys. In the northern and southern continuation of the Khanka lowland, the Nizhne-Bikinskaya and Razdolnenskaya plains are distinguished, formed by the valleys of large rivers: the Ussuri, Bikin, Alchan, and Razdol'naya.

The climatic conditions of the region are largely determined by its geographical location - at the junction of Eurasia and the Pacific Ocean. In winter, cold continental air masses prevail here, and in summer cool oceanic masses. At the same time, a “mitigating” effect, especially on coastal areas, has a monsoon climate: cool spring, rainy and foggy summer, sunny dry autumn and little snow with winds winter. In the central and northern regions of the region, the climate is more continental. The total annual precipitation is 600–900 mm, most of which falls in summer. The cold Primorye Current, which causes long-lasting fogs, runs along the coast from the north-east to the south-west.

== Extreme points ==
- The northernmost point- Dagda River
- The southernmost point - The mouth of Tumanna River with border with Korean Peninsula (North Korea)
- Westernmost point- near the source of Novgorodvka River
- Easternmost point- Golden Cape

The distance between North and South points - 900 km

The distance between East and West points- 430 km

== Physical characteristics ==
The highest peak of Primorsky Krai is Mount Anik with a height of 1,933 meters, located in the north-east of krai near the border with Khabarovsk Krai. The lowest point is Sea of Japan. The second highest peak is Cloudy Peak (1,855 meters) in the southeast of the Chuguyevsky District.

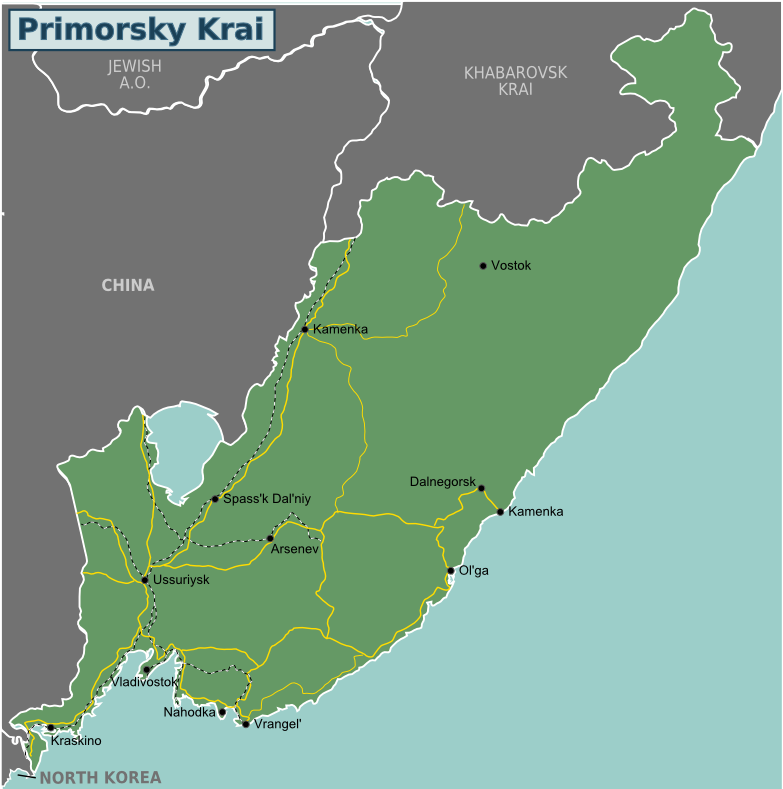
Map of Primorsky Krai

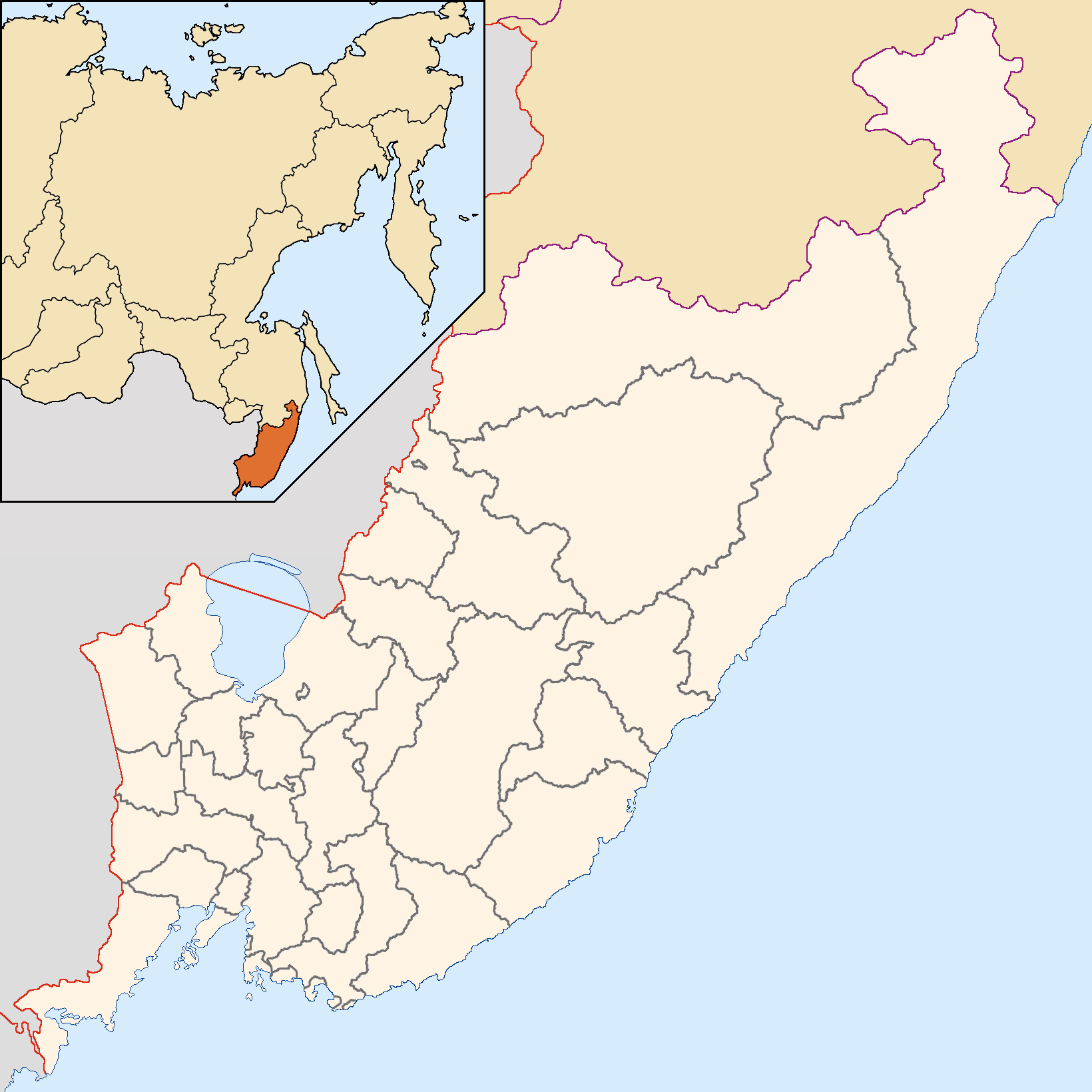
Borders of Primorsky Krai districts

In the southwest, there is Lake Khanka, which is the largest lake of the krai, near the border with China. The longest river is Ussuri, the source of the river is located on the slopes of the Snezhnaya mountains. For most of its length, the Ussuri flows along the border between China and Russia. The other large rivers are Bolshaya Ussurka, Malinovka and Arsenyevka rivers.

== Climate ==
The climate is temperate, monsoon . Winters are dry and cold with fair weather. Spring is long, cool, with frequent fluctuations in temperature. Summers are warm and humid, during the summer months there is a maximum amount of precipitation, in some areas up to 90% of annual precipitation. Autumn is usually warm, dry, with clear weather. In summer, southerly winds prevail from the Pacific Ocean, and in winter, northerly winds, bringing cold but clear weather from continental regions. The main feature is heavy precipitation and fog in summer. Summer is the time of typhoons, these tropical cyclones visit the region every year, sometimes causing great damage to the infrastructure of the region and agriculture . The average July temperature is +17 ... + 26 °C.The coldest summer in the region is on the East coast of Primorye because of the cold Primorsky Current, on the coast of the Tatar Strait . The hottest on the Khanka Plain. The absolute maximum of +41 °C is registered in the Border region . The average January temperature is from –8 °C to −18 °C on the coast, which, paired with humidity and winds, lowers it by 2 times, and in continental areas with a drier climate, the temperature sometimes reaches −38 °C, but wind weaker.

The warmest winter is in the south of the Khasansky district and on the East coast, the coldest is in the mountainous regions of the central and northern part of the region. The absolute minimum of −49 °C recorded in the Krasnoarmeysky district near the village of Glubinnoye is related to the temperature inversion in the intermountain basin. The coldest months are December, January and February. The warmest are June, July and August in the continental regions; July, August and September on the coast. Precipitations are 600–900 mm per year.

In the Primorsky Territory, four districts: Dalnegorsky, Kavalerovsky, Olginsky and Terneisky, as well as the urban-type settlement of east Krasnoarmeysky district, the village of Boguslavets, Vostretsovo, Dalniy Kut, Izmaylikh, Mill, Roshchino and Taiga in the district are equal to the districts of the Extreme North.

== Vegetation ==
Below are several systems that describe the flora and vegetation of the Primorsky Territory in one form or another . Used: floristic zoning, vegetation classification, bioclimatic zoning and landscape classification together with physiographic zoning. The natural area is an alternative name for the landscape area.

Floristic area	Florestic region	Vegetation Class	Main information	Bioclametic zone	Landscape area
East Asia	Manchuria	Blueberry spruce	Spruce forests	Subalpine analogue of the boreal	Subtaiga
East Asia	Manchuria	Mongolian Oak	Cedar forests	Cool moderate	Broadleaf
East Asia	Manchuria	Black Umber Oak	Mongolian Oak forest	Cool moderate	Broadleaf

== See also ==
- Geography of Russia
- Outer Manchuria
- History of Primorye
