= Shkot =

Shkot is a Russian surname. Notable people with the surname include:

- Nikolay Shkot (1828-1870), commander of the Imperial Russian Navy and explorer
- Pavel Shkot (1814-1880) - vice admiral of the Imperial Russian Navy

== See also ==
- Shkot Island
