= Michael Reinecke =

Russian vice-admiral and hydrographer (1801–1859)

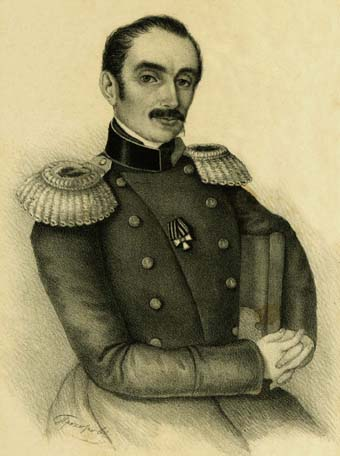
- Michael Reinecke
- Born: 20 November 1801; Grothusenshof, Livland Governorate, Russian Empire
- Died: 16 April 1859 (aged 57) Frankfurt am Main, German Confederation
- Allegiance: Russia
- Branch: Imperial Russian Navy
- Service years: 1814–1857
- Rank: Vice-admiral
- Awards: Order of St. Anna (3rd degree), Demidov Prize

Michael Franzevich von (Note: In German personal names, von is a preposition which approximately means 'of' or 'from' and usually denotes some sort of nobility. While von (always lower case) is part of the family name or territorial designation, not a first or middle name, if the noble is referred to by their last name, use Schiller, Clausewitz or Goethe, not von Schiller, etc.) Reinecke (Russian: Михаил Францевич Рейнеке; 10 November 1801 – 16 April 1859), better known as Mikhail Reyneke, was a Russian vice-admiral and hydrographer. During his service in the Imperial Russian Navy, Reinecke extensively documented the White Sea, the Baltic Sea, and the Barents Sea for the Russian Hydrographic Service, and determined the sea level measurement that became standardized throughout Russia.

== Biography ==
=== Early life ===
Michael Franzevich von Reinecke was born on 10 November 1801 in Grothusenshof, Livland Governorate, Russian Empire, into an aristocratic family of German descent, with his name translated into the Russian language as Mikhail Reyneke. The Reinecke family originated from the Livonian branch of a prominent Saxon family that appeared in Stargard, Pomerania (now Stargard Szczecinski, Poland) in the fifteenth century. The first documented use of the Reinecke name (also spelled Reineke) was Asmus Reineke, mentioned as a homeowner and a burgher in 1540 and 1567. The third son of Asmus David Reineke (1580-1622) graduated from the Stettinsky Gymnasium of St. Mary in Stettin and the University of Königsberg in Königsberg, and worked in Riga at the school of the Riga Cathedral. The third son of David Reineke and Margaretha von Mullen - Francis Reineke(1601-1665) also graduated from the University of Koenigsberg, was the tutor of Prince Jacob of Courland, and afterwards worked in Wenden (now Cēsis) as a judge, the president of the district court and the community of burghers. The sons of Francis and Helena Kippa started the branches of the Reineke family in Russia. Reinecke's grandfather, Franz Franzevich Reineke (1746 - 1821), was the burgomaster of justice in Vyborg, and later moved to Riga as an adviser to the court.

Reinecke was initially home tutored, then from 1812 to 1814 studied at the private boarding house in Ulrich in Saint Petersburg until entering the Marine Cadet Corps of the Imperial Russian Navy, passing the midshipman exam in June 1815. On 20 January 1818 Reinecke graduated from the Cadet Corps and was promoted to a non-commissioned officer.

=== Military service and hydrography ===
In Kronstadt, Reinecke was enlisted in the third naval crew under the former commander of the ship Moskva, Captain-Commodore E.P. Getzen, whose crew he had become aide-de-camp. In March 1823, Reinecke was promoted to lieutenant, and in 1824, sailed the White Sea on the brigantine Ketti under the command of D.A. Demidov, in order to measure the depth. This expedition did not achieve the desired results, but became Reinecke's first experience of practical hydrography. In February 1826, Reineke was appointed as the chief of an expedition on the shores of Lapland, and in the summer of the same year his expedition described the shores of the Kola Bay, the Tuloma River, and the western part of Lapland, for which Reinecke was awarded the Order of Saint Anna of the 3rd degree. During 1826, the brigantine Lapominka and two small schooners, Nomer 1 and Nomer 2, were built in Arkhangelsk specifically designed to work in the White Sea, and on 4 March 1827 Reinecke was appointed head of the White Sea expeditions. Over the next six years, Reineke spent every summer sailing, conducting hydrographic studies that ended in the fall of 1832. For these studies Reinecke was awarded an additional salary and promoted to the rank of captain-lieutenant. The result of the six-year work of the expedition was information which appeared in 1833-1834 Atlas of the White Sea and the Lapland coast, the text of which was published in two volumes, in 1843 and 1850, under the title Hydrographic description of the northern coast of Russia, -light. M. Reineke for which Reinecke was awarded the full Demidov Prize by the Imperial Academy of Sciences. Three lighthouses were built, on Cape Tersky Orlov and on the islands of Morzhovets and Zhizhgin, as a result of Reinecke's expeditions.

From 1833 to 1852, Reinecke was engaged in hydrographic research in the waters of the Baltic Sea. In 1840, Reineke was awarded the rank of captain, and on 6 December 1849 was promoted to Major General. On the basis of fifteen years of observations, Reinecke determined the average sea level and stamped it onto the granite of the Kronstadt Blue Bridge in Saint Petersburg. The accuracy of Reinecke's sea level measurement was so high that over time the Blue Bridge stamp became the standard in Saint Petersburg and then became the starting point of Russia's entire leveling network, and later long-term measurements confirmed the accuracy of the stamp and no adjustment was required.

By 1853, Reinecke began to suffer from ill health, and through the advice of doctors went to the Crimea to recuperate. Reinecke visited Admiral Pavel Nakhimov, his friend from the marine cadet academy, at his return to Sevastopol following Russian victory at the Battle of Sinop. In June 1855, Reinecke left Crimea to return to Saint Petersburg, and said goodbye to Nakhimov, who would die a month later at the Siege of Sevastopol. Reinecke was appointed a member of the Marine Scientific Committee and promoted to rear admiral. Only two months later, on 30 August 1855, Reinecke was promoted to vice-admiral and appointed director of the Hydrographic Department, inspector of the Fleet Navigator Corps, and chairman of the Marine Scientific Committee.

== Death ==
In December 1857, Reinecke entered retirement due to ill health, and in May 1858, travelled to Germany to help recuperate further. That summer Reinecke spent on the waters in Schwalbach, in September to Heidelberg, and in April 1859 went to Wiesbaden. In the evening of 15 April 1859, Reinecke arrived in Frankfurt am Main, where he died the next day at three in the afternoon.

=== Honors ===
Following his death, numerous geographic features were named in honor of Reinecke, including the island of Reyneke Island, Primorsky Krai in Peter the Great Gulf, the town of Reyneke on the island as part of Vladivostok, the island of Reyneke Island, Khabarovsk Krai in the Sea of Okhotsk, and bays in Novaya Zemlya and the Sea of Okhotsk.

== See also ==
- Nikolay Shkot

== Sources ==
- "Рейнеке, Михаил Францович" . Brockhaus and Efron Encyclopedic Dictionary (in Russian). 1906.
