= Nikolay Shkot =

Russian explorer (1829–1870)

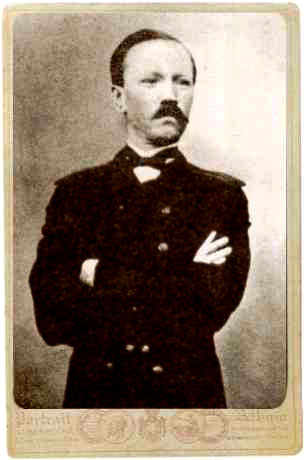
- Nikolay Yakovlevich Shkot
- Born: 26 December 1829; Kostroma Governorate, Russian Empire
- Died: 1 September 1870 (aged 40) Saint Petersburg, Russian Empire
- Allegiance: Russian Empire
- Branch: Imperial Russian Navy
- Rank: Captain

Nikolay Yakovlevich Shkot (Russian: Никола́й Я́ковлевич Шкот; 26 December 1829 – 1 September 1870) was a Russian sailor and explorer, best known for one of the earliest expeditions of the Russian Far East, and as a founder of Vladivostok.

== Biography ==
Nikolay Yakovlevich Shkot was born in 1829 in Makaryevsky District, Kostroma Governorate, Russian Empire, and graduated from the Naval Cadet Corps of the Imperial Russian Navy. His brother, Pavel Shkot, was a vice-admiral. Shkot was promoted to midshipman in 1848, and participated in the Siege of Sevastopol during the Crimean War, during which he was badly wounded in the battle. Shkot became a senior commander of the troopship Yaponets at the rank of lieutenant in 1856, before accepting command of corvette-steamship Amerika a year later on June 6, 1857. Shkot led an expedition in Amerika to the recently acquired region of the Russian Far East known as Outer Manchuria, which had been ceded by Qing China to the Russian Empire. The expedition recorded numerous geographic discoveries in largely undocumented region, particularly along the coast of modern Primorsky Krai and Sakhalin, including Peter the Great Gulf, the largest gulf in the Sea of Japan, Nakhodka Bay, and Moneron Island. In 1860, Shkot became one of the founders of Vladivostok, the largest city in the Russian Far East and capital of Primorsky Krai, at the south-western tip of Muravyov-Amursky Peninsula. Shkot also founded a hydrographic post on the site of modern Nakhodka and another in Posyet Bay. From October 2, 1864, Shkot was appointed captain over Russian ports on the Pacific Ocean, and in 1868 was promoted to captain 1st rank.

Shkot began to suffer from a serious illness in 1870, returning to Saint Petersburg where he died on September 1, and was buried in Krasnenkoye Cemetery. Several sites in southern Primorsky Krai were named in honor of Shkot, including Shkot Island in the Eugénie Archipelago, the town of Shkotovo, the Shkotovka River, and a cape in Olga Bay.

== See also ==
- Peter the Great Gulf
