= Dalnevostochny Morskoy Nature Reserve =

Nature reserve in Primorsky Krai, Russia

- Russian: Дальневосточный морской заповедник (Also: Far East Marine Reserve)
- IUCN category Ia (strict nature reserve)
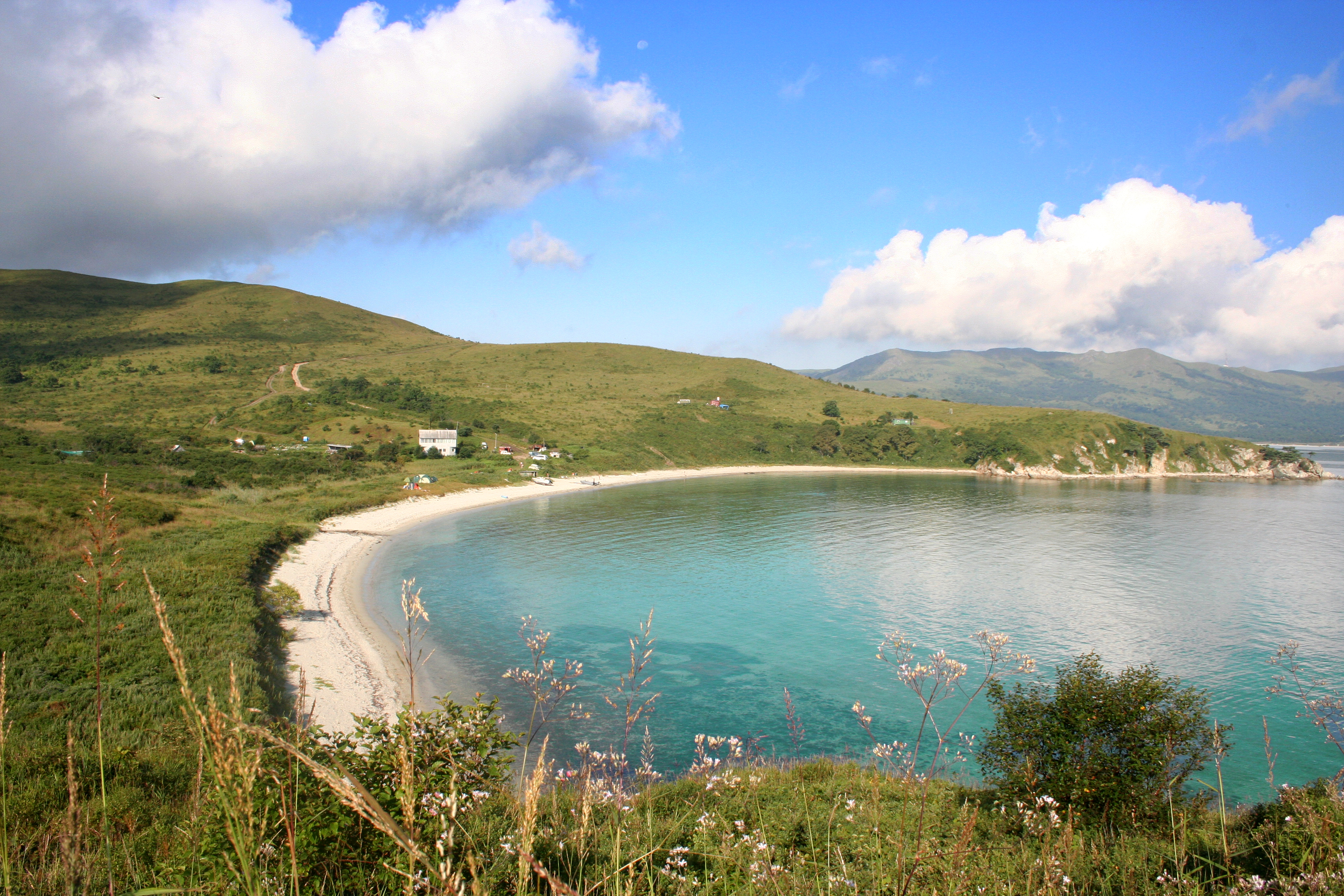
- Salvation Bay, in the East Sector of the Reserve

- Location within Russia
- Location: Primorsky Krai
- Nearest city: Vladivostok
- Coordinates: 42°33′59″N 131°12′0″E
- Area: 64,316 hectares (158,928 acres; 248 sq mi)
- Established: 1978
- Governing body: Ministry of Natural Resources and Environment (Russia)
- Website: http://morskoyzapovednik.ru

Dalnevostochny Morskoy Nature Reserve (Russian: Дальневосточный морской заповедник Dalnyevastochnyy marskoy zapavyednik) (also Far East Marine Reserve) is Russia's first marine reserve, covering large portions of the sea and 30 islands in Peter the Great Gulf, on the west side of the Sea of Japan. It has the highest class of environmental protection as a federal 'zapovednik' (strict ecological reserve). There are four distinct areas with different biological and protection regimes, covering 63,000 ha (240 sq mi) of sea area, additional land on included islands, a 500-meter conservation strip of coastline along the marine area, and a conservation buffer zone inland to a width of 3 miles. The reserve is situated on the continental coast south of Vladivostok in the Russian Far East. The administrative district is Khasansky District of Primorsky Krai. It was formally established in 1978. The reserve is part of the UNESCO "Far East Reserve" MAB Biosphere Reserve, noted for its protection of marine biodiversity, and as a re-population area for open seas fisheries.

== Topography ==
The Far East Marine Reserve covers about 10% of the total surface area of Peter the Great Gulf. The depth of the water average 60–70 meters in the area, and tides average about 0.5 meters. The waters of the reserve are of high transparency and purity, due to circulation patterns in the gulf. The reserve is divided into four sectors:

- East Section (45,000 ha water, 800 ha land). East Sector, the largest in the reserve, is located 70 km southwest of Vladivostok. It includes Great Peilz Island (ru:Большой Пелис), with an area of 3.6 km2. The island has few trees, being covered mostly with grasses and shrubs.
- South Section (15,000 ha water, 200 ha land). South Sector is the main research and scientific area of the reserve. It has numerous bays and capes, and is used for the study are redevelopment of individual species and biological communities.
- West Section (3,000 ha water). West Sector includes bays and areas designated for experimental aquaculture: about 100 hectares has been set aside as a nursery to collect larvae and grow juvenile scallops to replenish natural populations.
- North Section (216 ha). Covers the southern portion of Popov Island. The reserve's Excursion and Exhibition Center is on Popov Island. Administratively, this sector is in the Pervomaisky District of Vladivostok.

Being a marine reserve, most of the scientific focus is on the ecology of the seas, but there are islands and coastal buffers, which present a landscape of rocky cliffs and capes, and small peninsulas and bays. Inland from the coast are coniferous and deciduous forests.

== Climate and ecoregion ==
The Far East Marine Reserve is located in the Sea of Japan maritime ecoregion. In this sea, bounded by Asia, Japan, and the Sakhalin Islands, the Far East Reserve is on the west coast in the center. The Sea is Japan is distinct from the Pacific Ocean, with lower salinity, higher levels of dissolved oxygen, relatively little tidal movement, and little contribution of water from rivers (less than 1% of the gulf's waters). It is also at the meeting zone of boreal waters to the north and tropical waters to the south. As a result of its characteristics, the region has very high levels of biodiversity. The coastal lands and terrestrial parts of the islands are in the Manchurian mixed forests ecoregion.

The climate of Dalnevostochny Morskoy is Humid continental climate, cool summer (Köppen climate classification Dwb). This climate is characterized by high variation in temperature, both daily and seasonally; with dry winters and cool summers. Climate in the gulf is further characterized by monsoon conditions, uneven rainfall patterns, fog, gales, and seasonally variable winds (northwest in winter, southeast in summer). Some bays in the gulf freeze over in winter, but the ice is unstable. Average air temperature in January is 11 °C (52 °F), and 21 °C (70 °F) in August.

Water temperature in the gulf ranges from −1.8 °C (28.8 °F) in January, to 21 °C (70 °F) in August. The water temperature is thus similar to arctic waters in the winter, but sub-tropical in the summer.

== Flora and fauna ==
In the coastal waters there are three main vertical zones: Supralittoral zone, Intertidal zone and subtidal. The supralittoral, or splash zone, covers the area above the high tide mark; in the reserve this is mainly a region for algae, small crustaceans, and some beetles. The intertidal zone in the reserve is affected by warm temperatures in the summer, but scraped by ice and storms in the winter so that living creatures must cling in cracks and sheltered areas. The subtidal zone in the reserve, down to 200 meters, is the most biologically rich marine zone. Scientists of the Far East Marine Reserve have recorded 200 species of macroalgae, 200 of fish, 300 of molluscs, more than 200 of marine worms, and about 100 species of crustaceans.

For birds, the region is the richest in Russia - with over 340 species recorded. Great Pliez Island has some of the largest rookeries for the Japanese cormorant and black-tailed gull. The reserve is on the Far East flyway for migratory birds. The gulf is also known for its marine invertebrates, including cucumber, crab, and giant octopus. Minke whale, dolphins, and killer whales migrate into the gulf.

== Ecoeducation and access ==
As a strict nature reserve, the Dalnevostochny Morskoy Reserve is mostly closed to the general public, although scientists and those with 'environmental education' purposes can make arrangements with park management for visits. The reserve has made arrangements with eco-tourism operators to provide guided sea excursions to certain portions of the territory for members of the public. The main office is in the city of Vladivostok.

== See also ==
- List of Russian Nature Reserves (class 1a 'zapovedniks')
- National parks of Russia
