= Eastern Bosphorus =

Strait in the Sea of Japan, Russia

Coordinates: 43°04′N 131°54′E

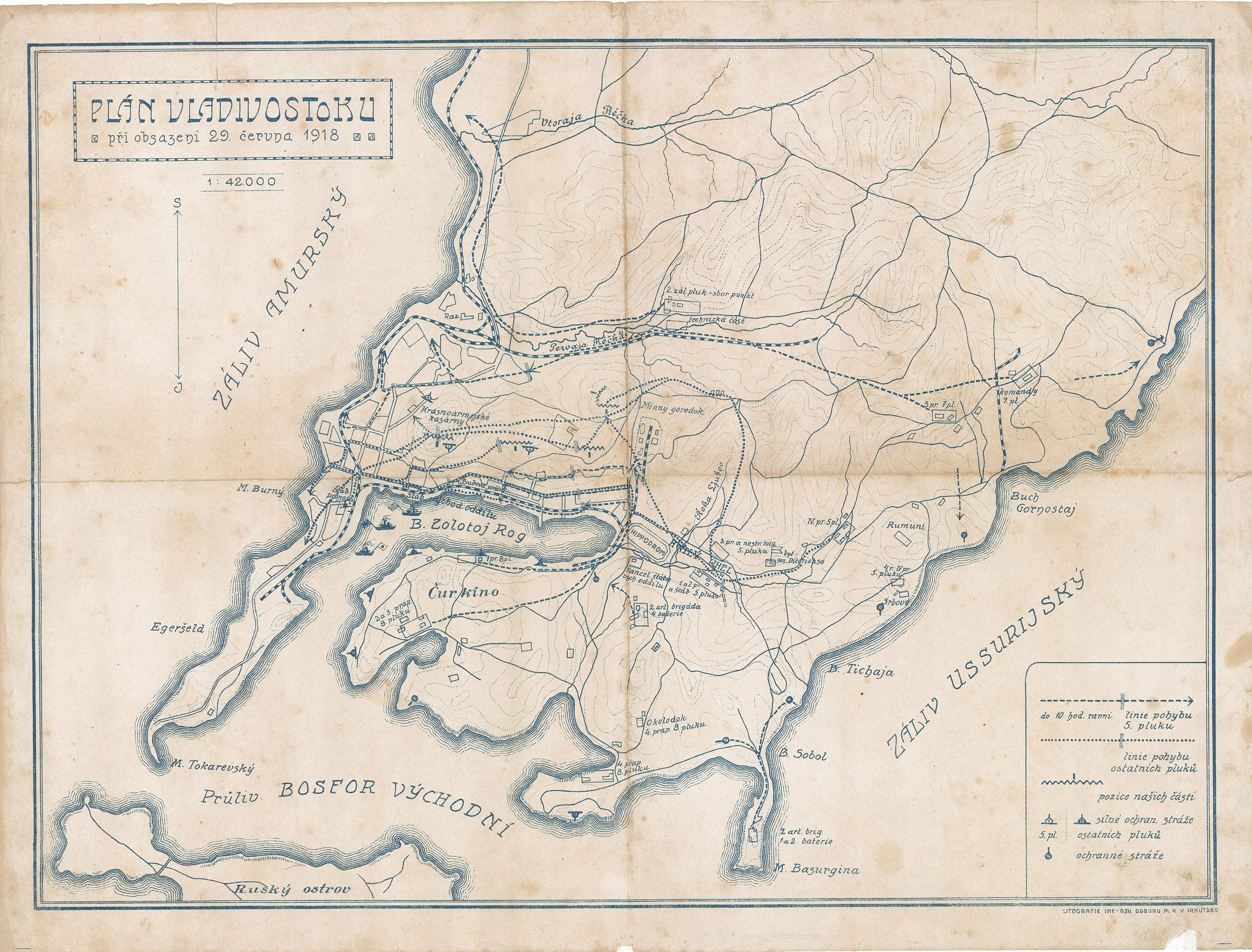
Map of Vladivostok from 1918

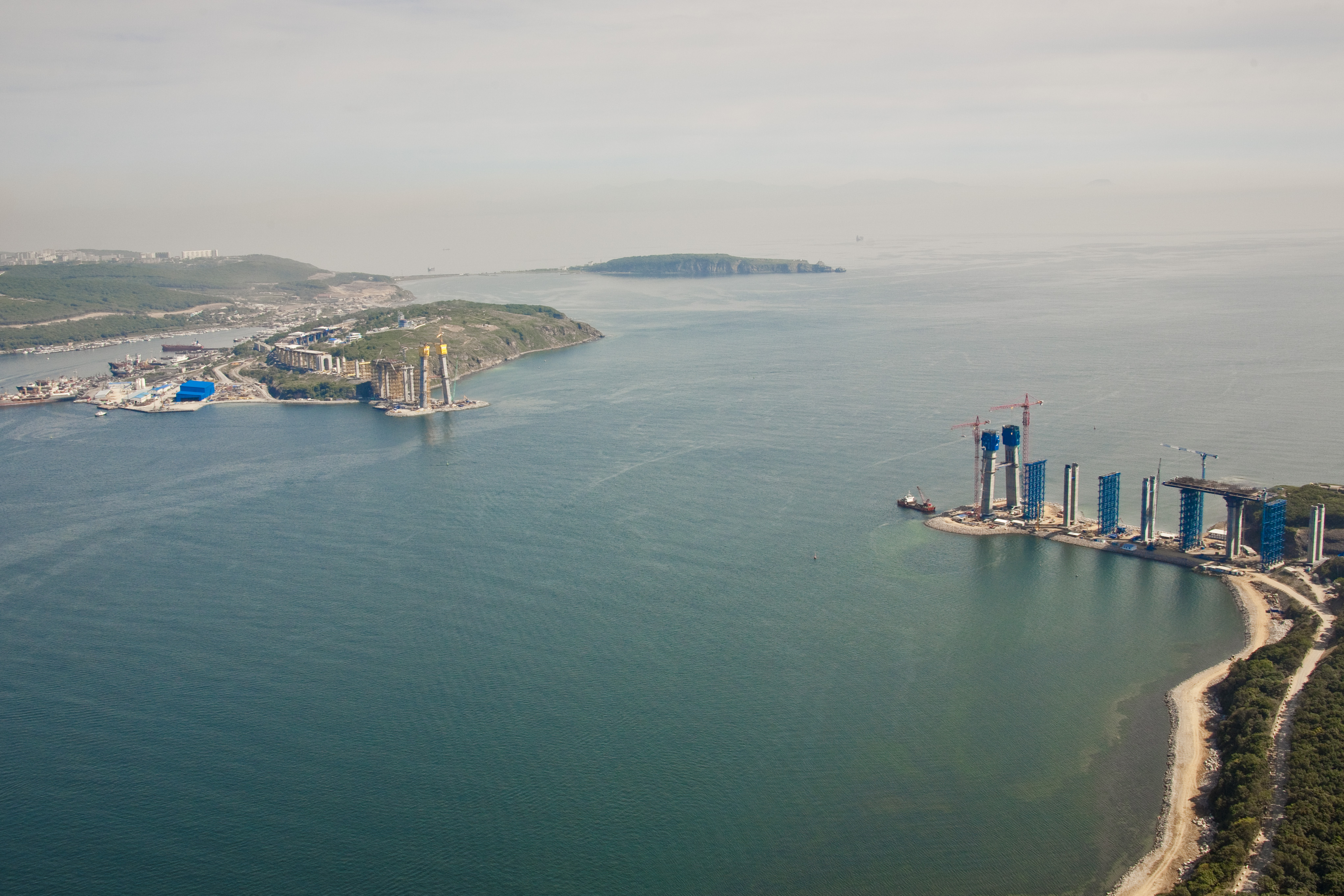
Russky Bridge under construction

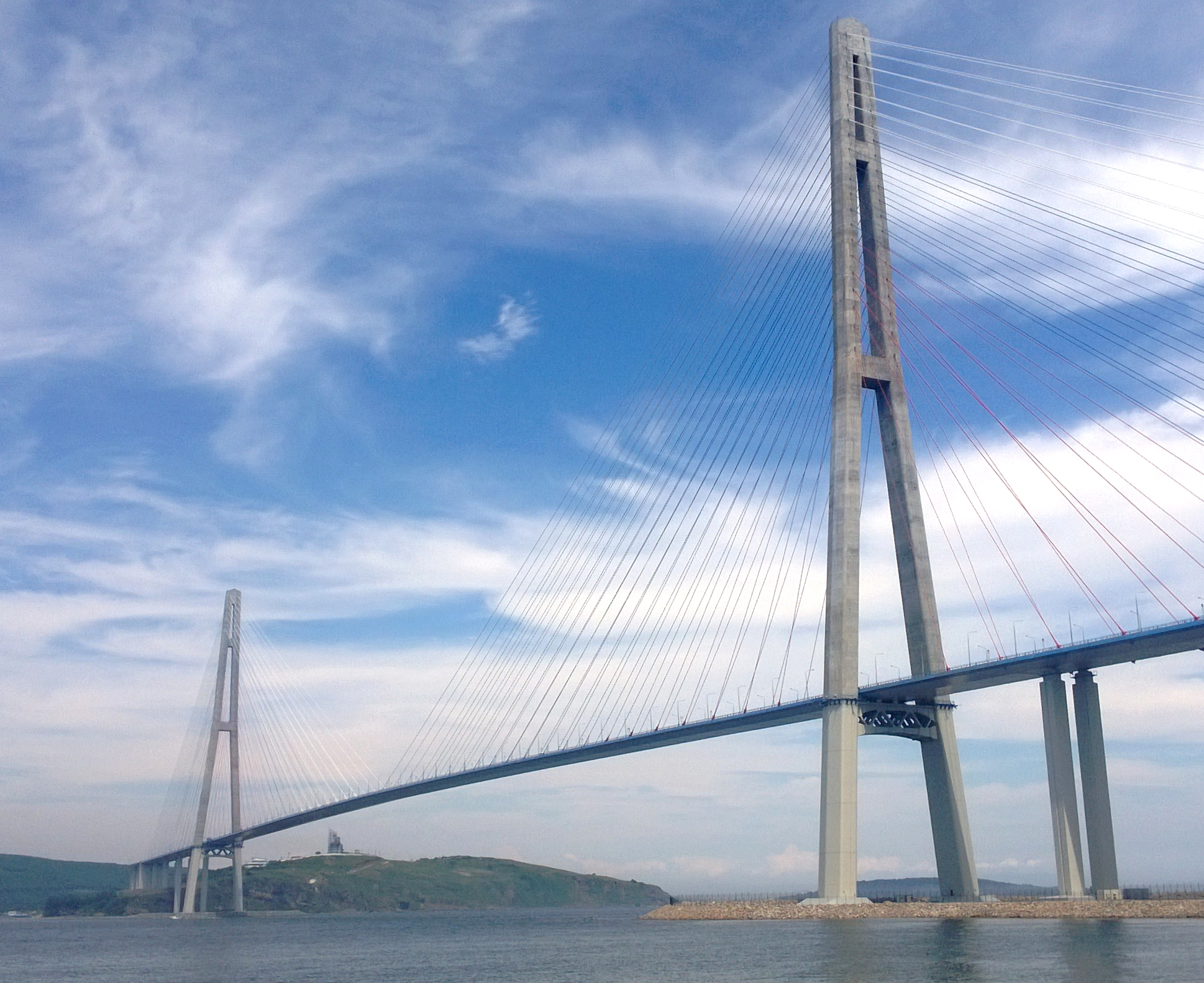
Russky Bridge

The Eastern Bosphorus (Russian: Босфор Восточный, Bosfor Vostochny) is a strait located in Primorsky Krai, Russia, that separates the Muravyov-Amursky Peninsula and Russky Island, and connects Amur Bay and Ussuri Bay within Peter the Great Gulf.

The Eastern Bosphorus has a depth of up to 50 meters (160 feet) and is about 9 kilometers (5.6 miles) long and only 800 meters (2,600 feet) wide at its narrowest point. The strait features several bays within the peninsula and Russky Island, including the major Zolotoy Rog bay. Around this bay, most of the city of Vladivostok is located. The Russky Bridge, a cable-stayed bridge connecting the peninsula and Russky Island sections of Vladivostok, was completed in July 2012 and with a span of 1,104 meters (3,622 feet) is the second longest cable-stayed bridge in the world as of 2025.

== See also ==
- Pacific Coast of Russia
- Bosphorus
- Cimmerian Bosporus
