= Muravyov-Amursky Peninsula =

Peninsula containing Vladivostok, Russia

Coordinates: 43°16′N 132°08′E

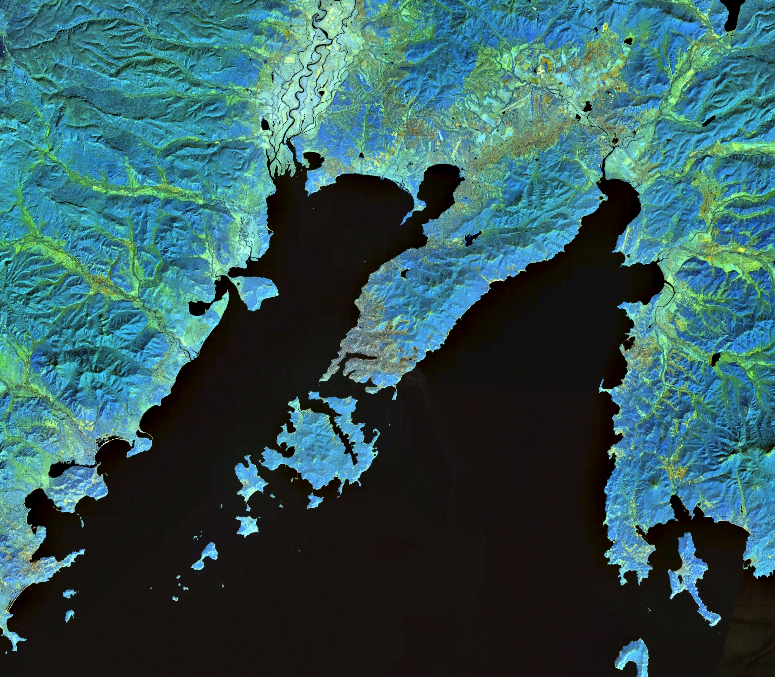
The Peter the Great Gulf: Amur Bay (west), Muravyov-Amursky Peninsula and Ussuri Bay (east).

The Muravyov-Amursky Peninsula (Russian: полуостров Муравьёва-Амурского) is a peninsula in Primorsky Krai, Russia, located in the Peter the Great Gulf of the Sea of Japan. Vladivostok, the administrative center of the krai, is located on the southern tip of the peninsula.

== Geography ==
The peninsula is approximately 30 km long and 12 km wide, subdividing the Peter the Great Gulf into Amur Bay on its west and Ussuri Bay on its east. The Eastern Bosphorus separates the peninsula from Russky Island, the northernmost island of the Eugénie Archipelago immediately south of the peninsula. Lazurnaya Bay on the eastern shore of the peninsula contains sand beaches.

== History ==
Historically, the Muravyov-Amursky Peninsula was a part of the geographic region of Manchuria, which had been ruled by the Jurchen people which later became part of the Manchu agglomeration, who later became the rulers of China in 1644 and established the Qing dynasty. In the nineteenth century, the portion of the region which later became known as Outer Manchuria was gradually ceded by the Qing to the Russian Empire, with the Treaty of Aigun in 1858 and the Convention of Peking in 1860. The lands ceded by the Convention of Peking included the Muravyov-Amursky Peninsula, and were later organized by Russia into Primorsky Krai. The Russians named the peninsula after Count Nikolay Muravyov-Amursky, who had played a major role in Russian expansion from Siberia towards the Pacific Ocean.
