= Shkot Island =

Island in the Sea of Japan

Coordinates: 42°56′N 131°50′E

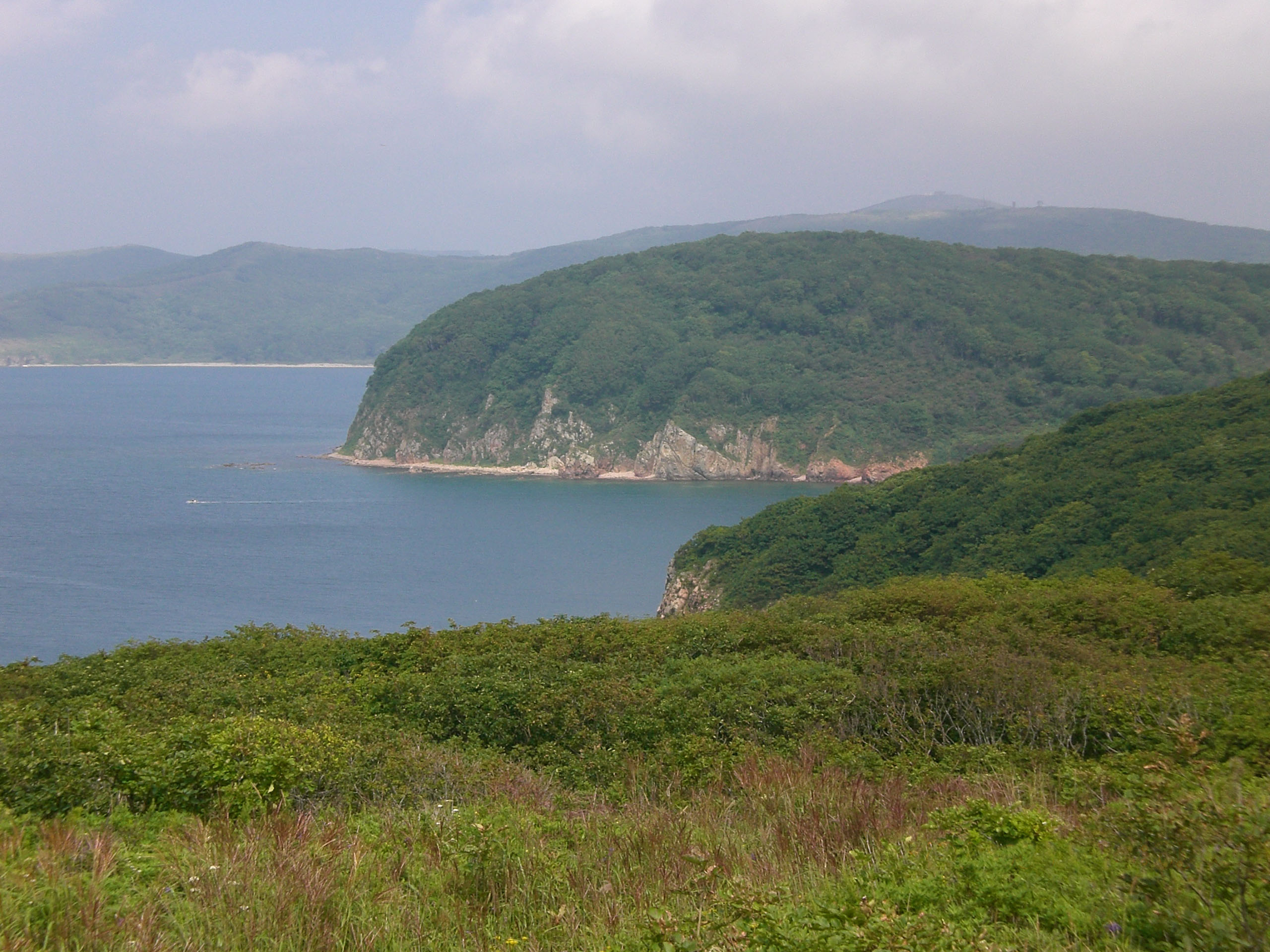
On Shkot Island

Shkot Island (Russian: Остров Шкота lit. Isle of Shkot) is an island in the Eugénie Archipelago within the Peter the Great Gulf of the Sea of Japan. The uninhabited island is one of the five large islands in the archipelago, with an area of 2.6 square kilometres (1.0 square mile) and its highest point at 146 metres (479 feet) above sea level. Shkot Island is located 0.5 kilometres (0.3 miles) directly south of Russky Island, to which it is connected by a low thin isthmus, making it one of only two islands in the archipelago accessible to the mainland by foot.

Shkot Island, like all islands of Eugénie Archipelago, is administratively part of the city of Vladivostok in Primorsky Krai, Russia. The island was named after Nikolay Shkot, the commander of the Russian Imperial Navy corvette Amerika who led one of the earliest hydrographic expeditions in the Primorsky Krai and Sakhalin regions of the Russian Far East in 1863, and was a co-founder of Vladivostok.
