= Rikord Island =

Island in the sea of Japan

Coordinates: 42°52′N 131°39′E

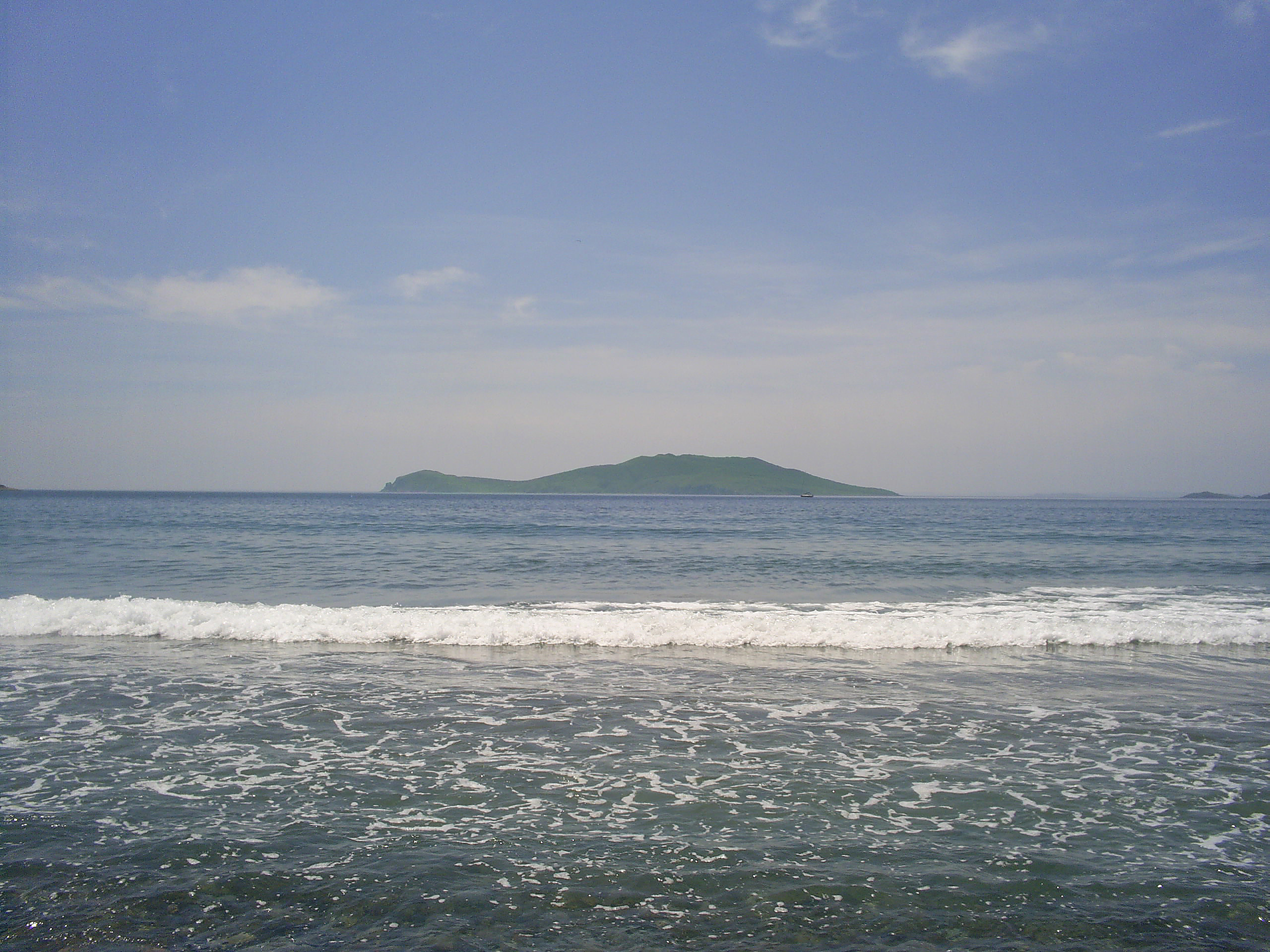
Isle of Rikord seen from Reyneke Island

Rikord Island (Russian: Остров Рикорда) is an island in Peter the Great Gulf located 30 km (19 mi) to the south of Zolotoy Rog and 4 km (2 mi) to the south of Reyneke Island. It was named after admiral Pyotr Rikord.

With an area of nearly 5 km^{2} (2 sq mi), it is the largest uninhabited island of Primorsky Krai. Administratively the island is under Vladivostok's jurisdiction.

The highest point is 178 m (584 ft) above sea level. The island is a part of Eugénie de Montijo Archipelago.
