= Popov Island =

Russian island in the Sea of Japan

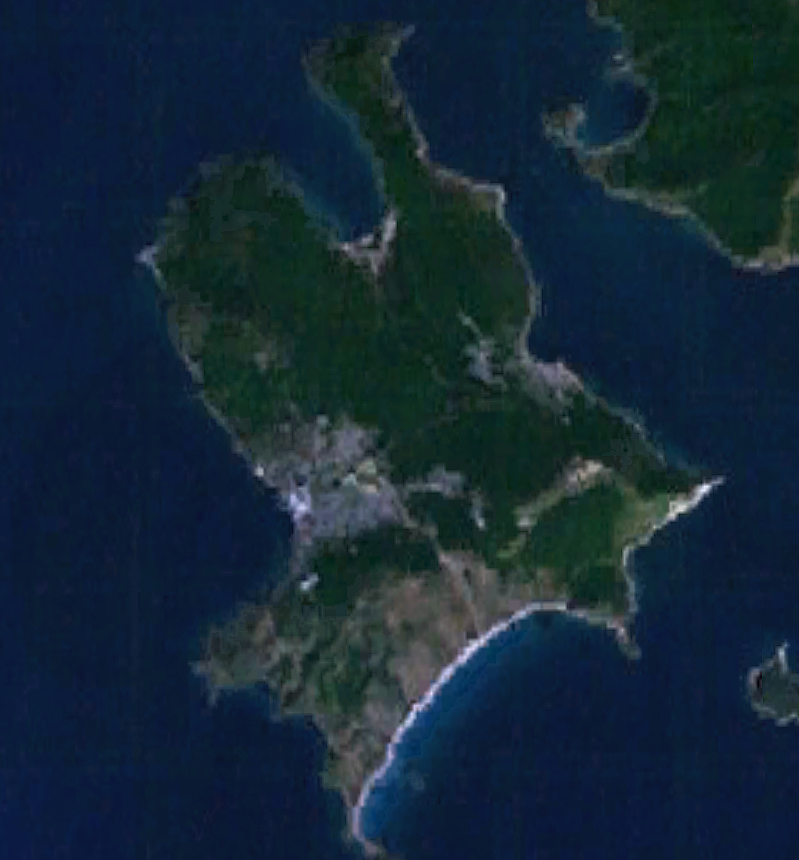

Popov Island (Russian: Остров Попова, 42°57′N 131°43′E) is an island in the Eugénie de Montijo Archipelago. It lies in Peter the Great Gulf, 20 km to the south of Zolotoy Rog between Reyneke and Russky Islands. It is named after admiral Andrey Alexandrovich Popov. Area is 12,4 km^{2}. Population: 1316 (2005) in two settlements (Stark and Popova). Administratively the island is under Vladivostok's jurisdiction.

== Gallery ==
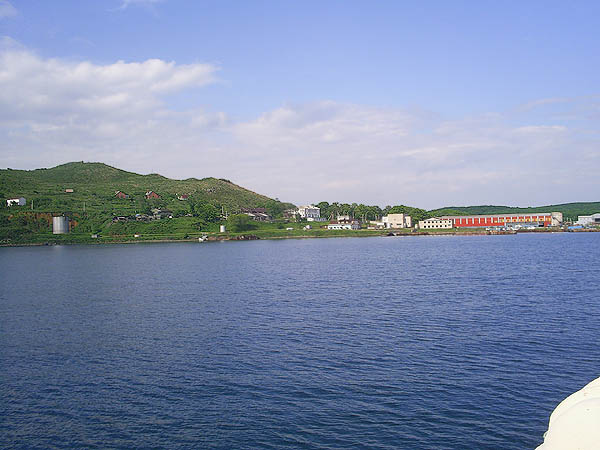
Island from ferry

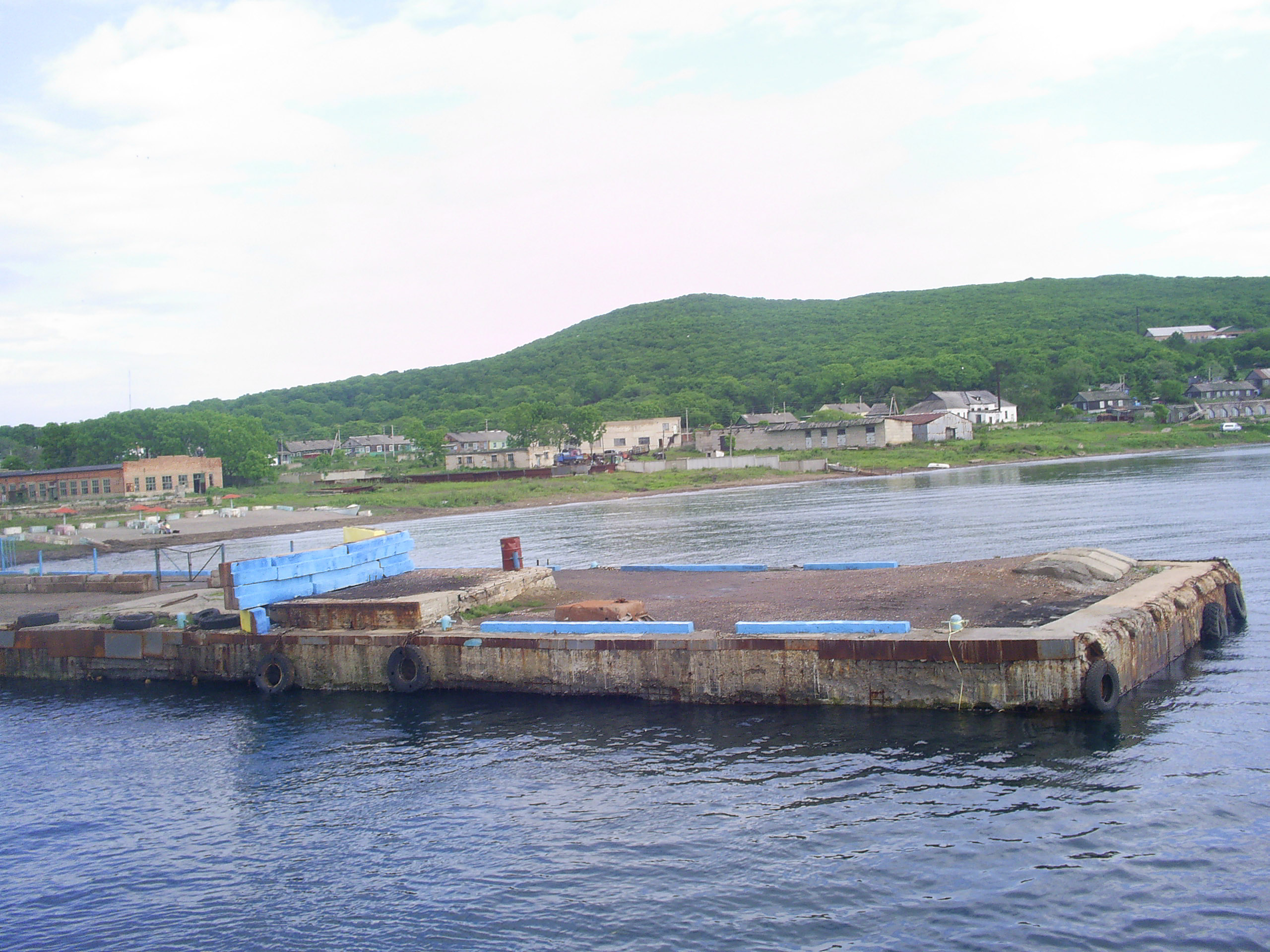
Moorage on Popov Island

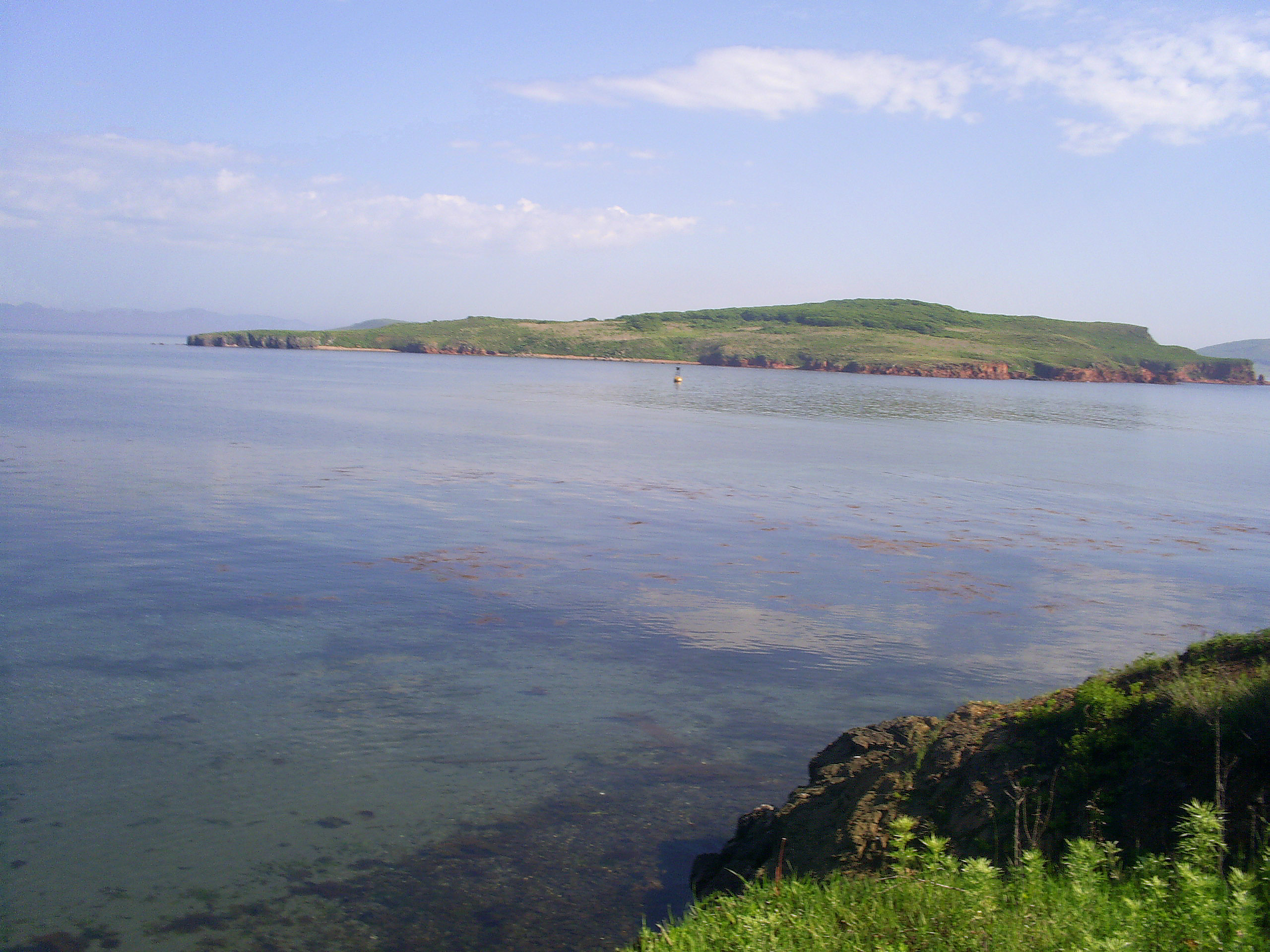
Popov Island viewing from Reyneke Island
