= Russky Island =

Island in Peter the Great Gulf in the Sea of Japan

Coordinates: 43.00°N 131.85°E

Native name: Остров Русский
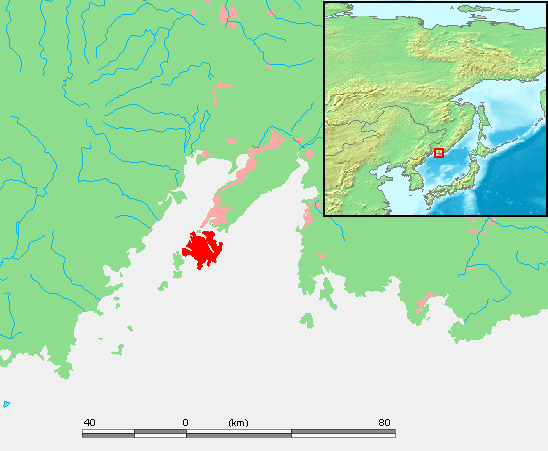
- Location of Russky Island in the Eastern Bosphorus

Geography
- Location: Eastern Bosphorus, Sea of Japan
- Area: 97.6 km^{2} (37.7 sq mi)
- Highest elevation: 291.2 m (955.4 ft)

Administration
- Russia
- Krai: Primorsky Krai

Demographics
- Population: 10,424 (2021)
- Pop. density: 5.4918/km^{2} (14.2237/sq mi)

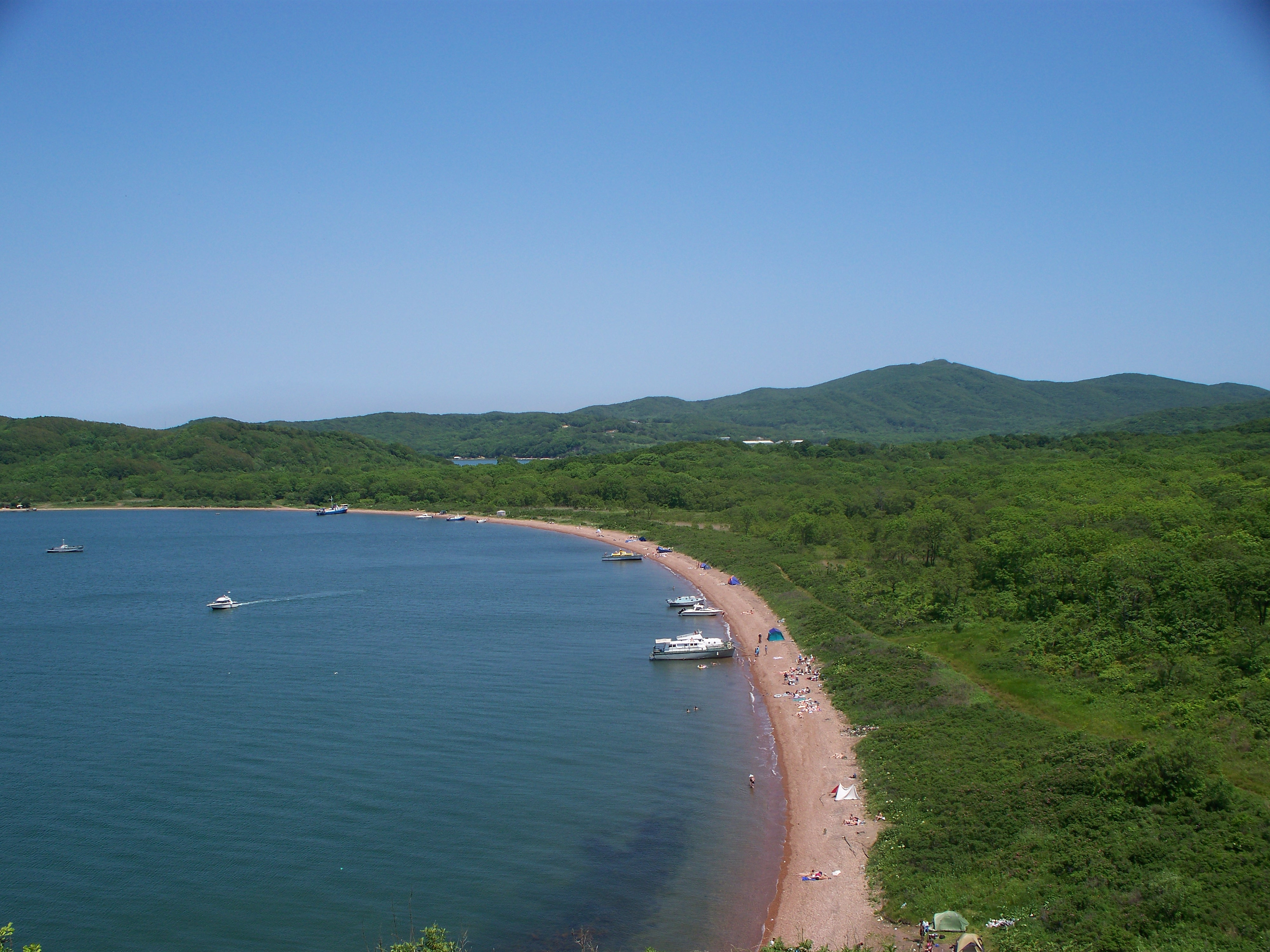
A view of the beach at Philippovsky Bay, Russky Island (2008).

Russky Island (Russian: Ру́сский о́стров, lit. 'Russian Island') is an island in Peter the Great Gulf in the Sea of Japan, in Primorsky Krai, Russia. It is the largest island in the Eugénie Archipelago, separated from the Muravyov-Amursky Peninsula immediately to the north by the Eastern Bosphorus, and is one of the four islands in Primorsky Krai that are permanently inhabited, with a population of 10,424 (2021).

Russky Island is home to Far Eastern Federal University and the southern span of the Russky Bridge, the world's second longest cable-stayed bridge, connecting the island across the Eastern Bosphorus to the mainland portion of Vladivostok.

== Geography ==
Russky Island is located about 9,334 kilometres (5,800 mi) east of Moscow, the capital of Russia. It is the largest island in Primorsky Krai, with about a quarter of its area being the Saperny Peninsula, which forms much of the north and east of the island, and the closest part to the mainland. Novik Bay is a long and thin bay located between the Saperny Peninsula and the remainder of the island.

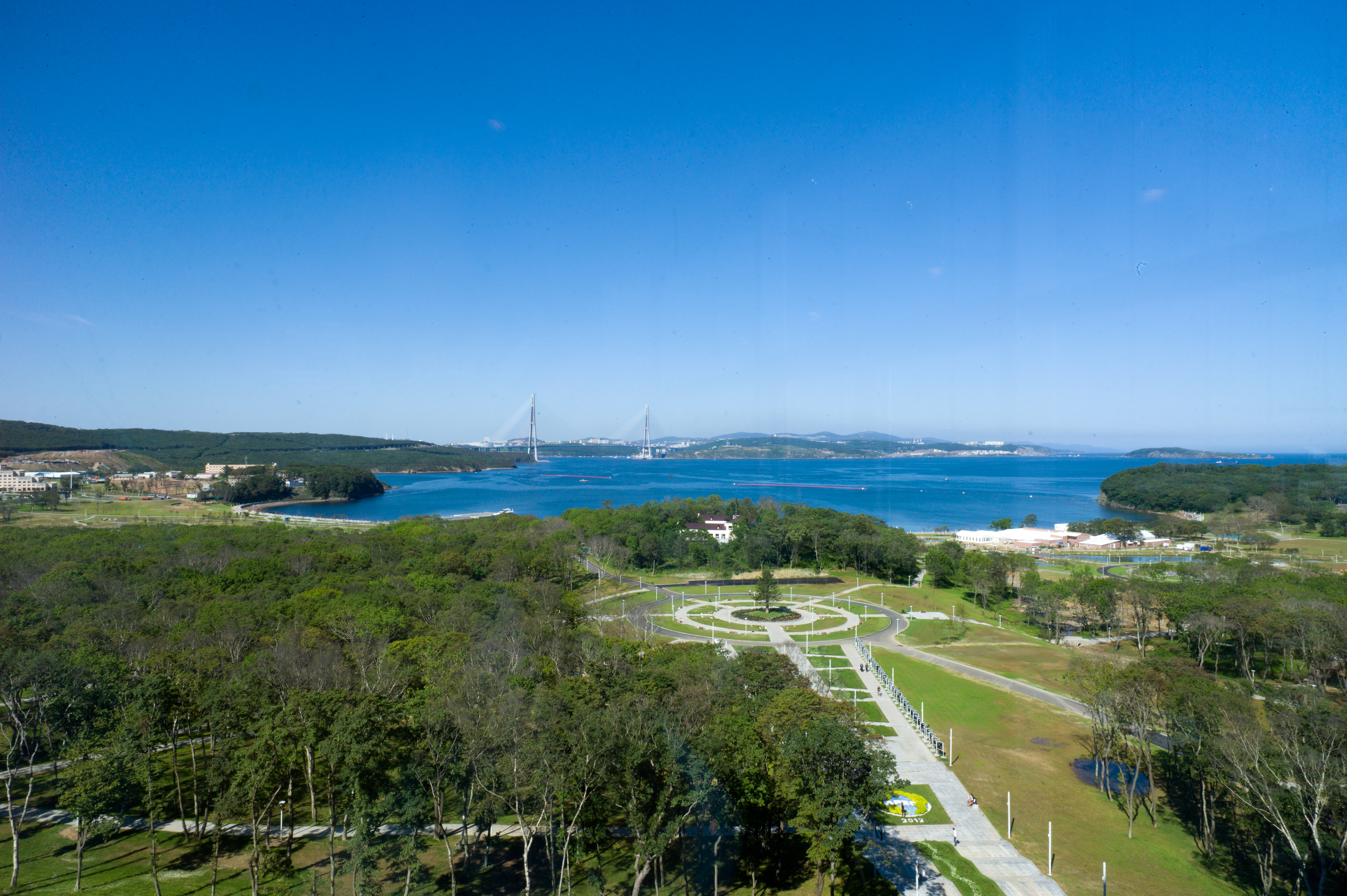
A view of the Eastern Bosphorus with the Russky Bridge visible, seen from the Far Eastern Federal University campus.

Russky Island is the largest and northernmost island in the Eugénie Archipelago, a cluster of small islands and islets south of the Muravyov-Amursky Peninsula that extend to the southwest for about 40 km (25 mi). Major neighboring islands in the archipelago include Shkot Island to the south, Popov Island (7 km (4.3 mi) long, 4.3 km (2.7 mi) wide), Reyneke Island (3.4 km (2.1 mi) across), and Rikord Island (4.1 km (2.5 mi) long and less than 2 km (1.2 mi) wide) to the south-west. There are many small islets and sea stacks scattered between them. Shkot Island is the only island in the archipelago connected to Russky Island by land, as a thin isthmus forms a land bridge during low tide.

Russky Mountain, 291 metres (955 ft) above sea level, is the highest point of Russky Island and the Eugénie Archipelago, and one of the highest peaks of Vladivostok. It is located in the northern part of the island, near the south-western shore of the Novik Bay. The source of the Russky River is on the southern slope of the mountain.

== History ==
The first map to feature Russky Island was published in Russia in 1859, although only the western and northern shores of the island were shown. It became a part of the Russian Empire the following year in 1860 after the Convention of Peking, when Outer Manchuria was ceded by Qing China. The island was named Russky Island, meaning "Russian Island", by Nikolay Muravyov-Amursky, the governor-general of Eastern Siberia. The island was charted in its entirety by an expedition led by the cartographer Lieutenant Colonel Vasily Babkin in 1862, as part of the survey of Peter the Great gulf after its acquisition. A map featuring the whole island was published in 1865 with the name Kazakevich Island, in honour of Petr Kazakevich, the military governor of Primorskaya Oblast. The names Russky Island and Kazakevich Island were used interchangeably until after World War II, when it was permanently changed to only Russky Island.

By 1889, Fort Pospelov had been built on the island as part of the Vladivostok Fortress complex, as developed by Colonel K. I. Velichko. Over several years, the initial temporary wooden structures were gradually replaced with stone structures. Fort Russky was built on Russky Mountain, near the highest point on the island, between 1898 and 1903. The fort was built in an irregular trapezoid shape, with numerous artillery batteries which were meant to be able to fire into almost all the bays of Russky island in case of invasion. During the Soviet era, the island was a closed territory and was home to several military installations, and became one of the largest training areas for the Soviet Navy.

In 1992, Russky Island became the scene of a political scandal when four soldiers of the Russian Navy serving at an isolated garrison on the island starved to death and dozens of others were hospitalized suffering from the effects of starvation. Their commanders had failed to send them rations for months, and the matter became a national scandal regarding the state of the armed forces.

In 2002, the St. Seraphim Monastery, a monastery belonging to the Vladivostok diocese of the Russian Orthodox Church, was built on the island.

In April 2019, the island hosted a summit between President Vladimir Putin and North Korean Supreme Leader Kim Jong-un.

== Development ==
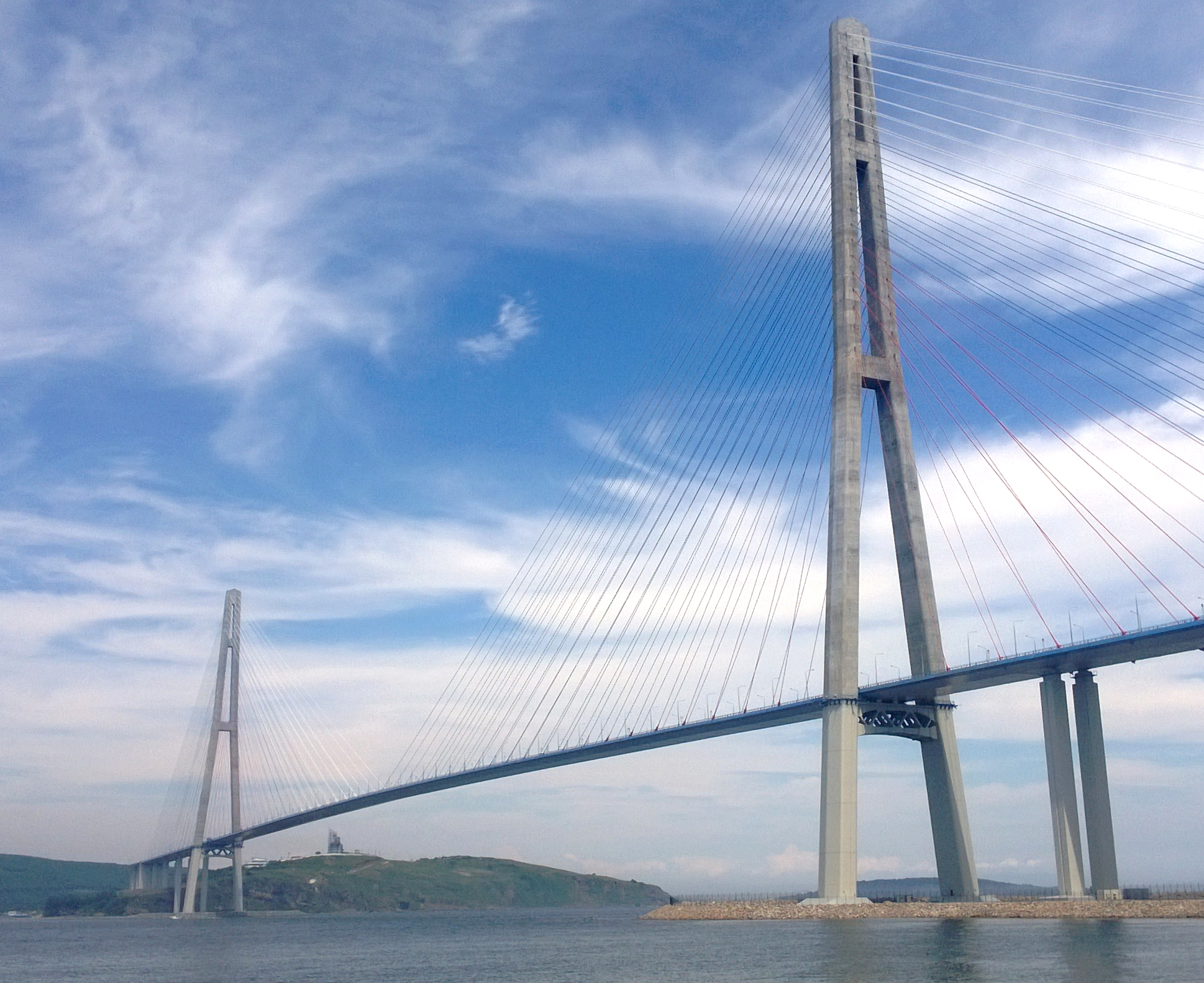
Russky Bridge from Russky Island to mainland Vladivostok

Development of Russky Island is linked to Russia's response to growing Chinese economic power in the region and the opportunity of the Chinese market.

The 2012 Asia-Pacific Economic Cooperation summit was held on Russky Island, and about US$6 billion was set aside for the development of the island and Vladivostok in preparation for the summit and construction of the site for the 2012 APEC conference that was also planned and built as a new campus for the Far Eastern Federal University. Plans include the potential to develop the island as a large scale tourist resort and to construct the official residence of the Russian president in the Russian Far East in Boyarin Bay were approved by the APEC summit. The Russky Bridge between Russky Island and Vladivostok was completed in July 2012, and has the longest cable-stayed bridge span in the world at 1,104 metres (3,622 ft).

== See also ==
- List of islands of Russia
