= Lazurnaya Bay =

Bay in Russia

Coordinates: 43°11′28″N 132°7′14″E

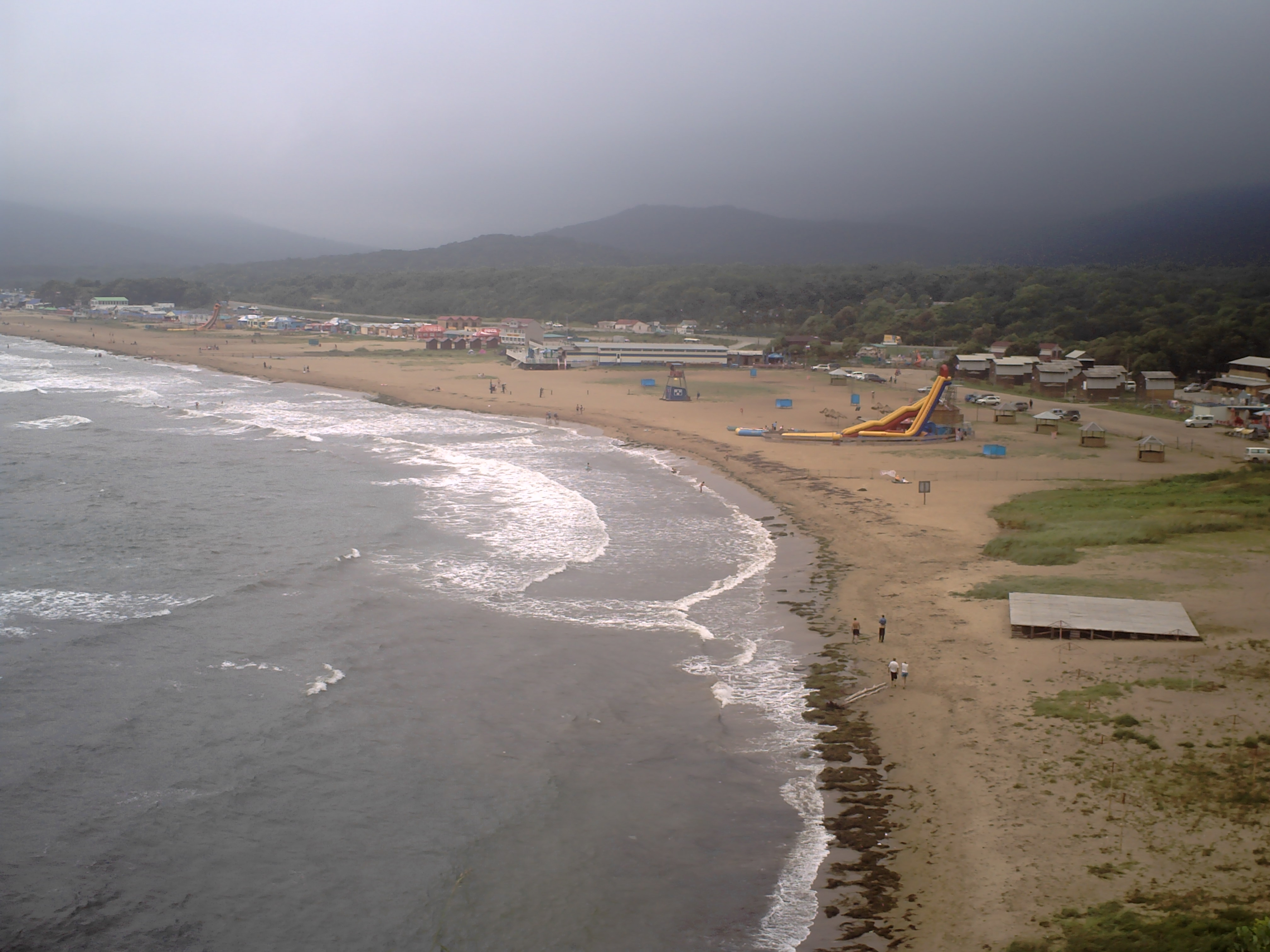
Lazurnaya Bay

Lazurnaya Bay (Russian: бухта Лазурная) is a bay on the east side of the Muravyov-Amursky Peninsula in Russia. It lies to the northeast of Vladivostok and to the southwest from the Three Little Pigs Bay. The Lazurnaya Bay forms part of the Ussuri Bay in the Sea of Japan.

The toponym was coined in the 1970s and translates from Russian as "the Azure Bay". The older, traditional name is Shamora (Russian: Шамора) which supposedly translates from Chinese as "sandy desert". From the 1880s until 1973, it was officially called Feldhausen Bay (in honor of Alexander Feldhausen, the first Military Governor of Vladivostok). The Shamora beach gave its name to a collection of old songs by the Vladivostok band Mumiy Troll.
