= Eugénie Archipelago =

Archipelago in the Peter the Great Gulf, Russia

Coordinates: 42°57′N 131°45′E

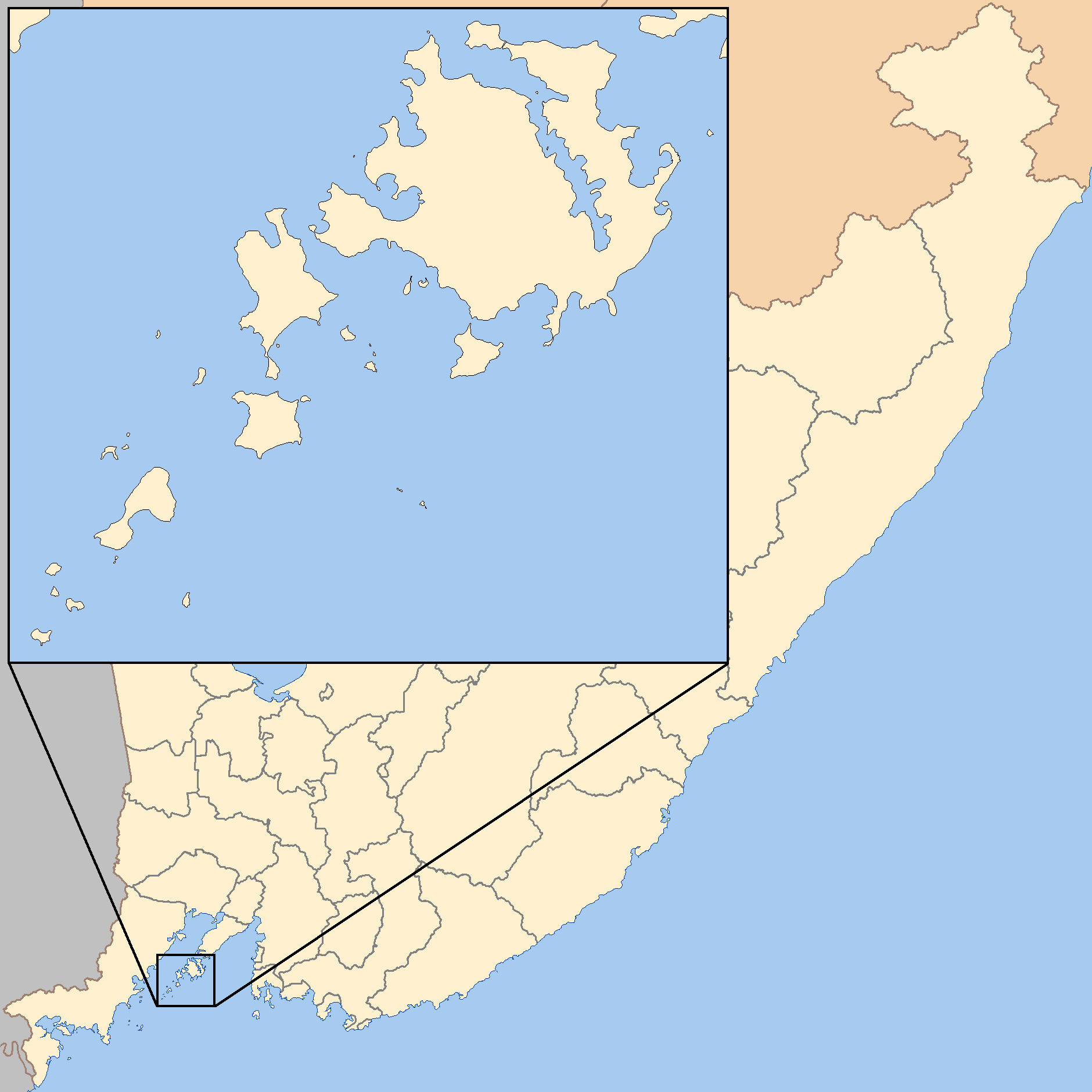
Eugénie de Montijo Archipelago

The Empress Eugénie Archipelago (Russian: Архипелаг Императрицы Евгении, romanized: Arkhipelag Imperatritsy Yevgenii), commonly known as the Eugénie Archipelago, is an archipelago in the Peter the Great Gulf in the Sea of Japan, along the southern coast of Primorsky Krai, Russia. The population of the archipelago is 6,810 (2005), and is administratively part of the city of Vladivostok.

== History ==
European contact with Peter the Great Gulf was limited until the mid-19th century, due to Japan's isolationist policies and the enclosed geography of the Sea of Japan. The French corvette Capricieuse, under Captain G. de Rocquemaurel, reached the gulf in 1852. The French expedition named various local features, including the archipelago in honor of Empress Eugénie de Montijo, the wife of Napoleon III, Emperor of the French. These names appeared in a French map published in 1854. In August 1856, British ships HMS Winchester and HMS Barracouta surveyed the area, naming Golden Horn Bay as Port May and referring to Peter the Great Gulf as Victoria Bay. The original name "Empress Eugénie Archipelago" was reinstated in international geographical registries in 1994.

== Geography ==
The archipelago comprises five large islands: Russky Island, Popov Island, Rikord Island, Reyneke Island, and Shkot Island, as well as over two dozen smaller islands and rocky islets. Notable smaller islands include Moiseyev, the Pakhtusov Islands (Bolshoi Pakhtusov, Tsentralny Pakhtusov, Severny Pakhtusov), Zheltukhin, Lavrov, Engel'm, Naumova, Maly, Klykova, Kozlova, Karanzina, Tsivolko, and the Two Brothers.

Peter the Great Gulf covers approximately 9,000 square kilometers (3,500 sq mi) and features a coastline of about 1,500 kilometers (930 mi), including the islands. It is bounded by the Tumen River estuary and Cape Povorotny, and contains two major bays: Amur Bay and Ussuri Bay. The islands formed approximately 8,000–10,000 years ago due to sea-level rise during the Holocene. Zheltukhin and Moiseyev are composed of granitoids of the Lopingian, while the Pakhtusov Islands consist of andesites, rhyolites, tuffs, and tuffaceous sediments. The islands exhibit low-mountain terrain. Zheltukhin Island reaches 75 meters in elevation, Moiseyev 50 meters, and the Pakhtusov Islands between 19.5 and 41.9 meters.

The region has a monsoonal climate, with an annual mean temperature around 6 °C (43 °F) and yearly precipitation averaging 830 mm, concentrated in late summer. Winters are dry and windy, and the area is influenced by cyclonic activity, occasional typhoons, the cold Primorsky Current, and the warm Tsushima Current. Freshwater is limited, with sparse groundwater outflows observed on Zheltukhin Island.

Vegetation includes polydominant broad-leaved forests with species such as Amur lime (Tilia amurensis), Amur cork tree (Phellodendron amurense), Japanese angelica tree (Aralia elata), and Chinese ash (Fraxinus chinensis). Other communities include Artemisia gmelinii thickets, halophytic beach vegetation, and petrophytic assemblages on cliffs. Japanese yew (Taxus cuspidata), a protected species, is found on Tsentralny Pakhtusov Island. Vegetation has fluctuated with Holocene climate cycles, expanding during warm periods and receding during colder epochs. Lichens are abundant, with epiphytic species in forests, epilithic species on rocks, and halophytic lichens along coastal overwash zones.

The archipelago hosts commercially significant bivalves such as Gray's mussel (Crenomytilus grayanus) and the Kuril horsemussel (Modiolus kurilensis). Gray's mussel predominates on rocky substrates, while mixed aggregations occur on softer seabeds. Biomass is greatest at depths of 1–10 meters (3 ft 3 in – 32 ft 10 in). The dominant soil type is brown forest soil (burozems), often thin and skeletal on elevated or rocky areas. Moiseyev Island is notable for its humified brown forest soils due to flat relief and dense vegetation. Military activity has disturbed soils in some areas, particularly on Zheltukhin Island.

== Gallery ==
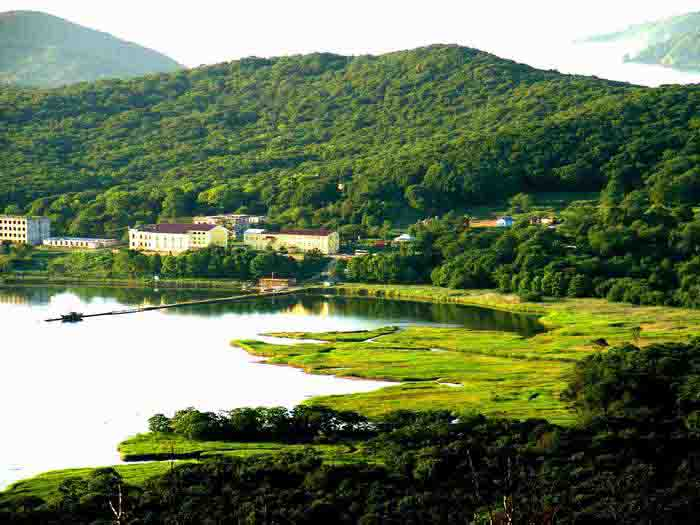
Russky Island

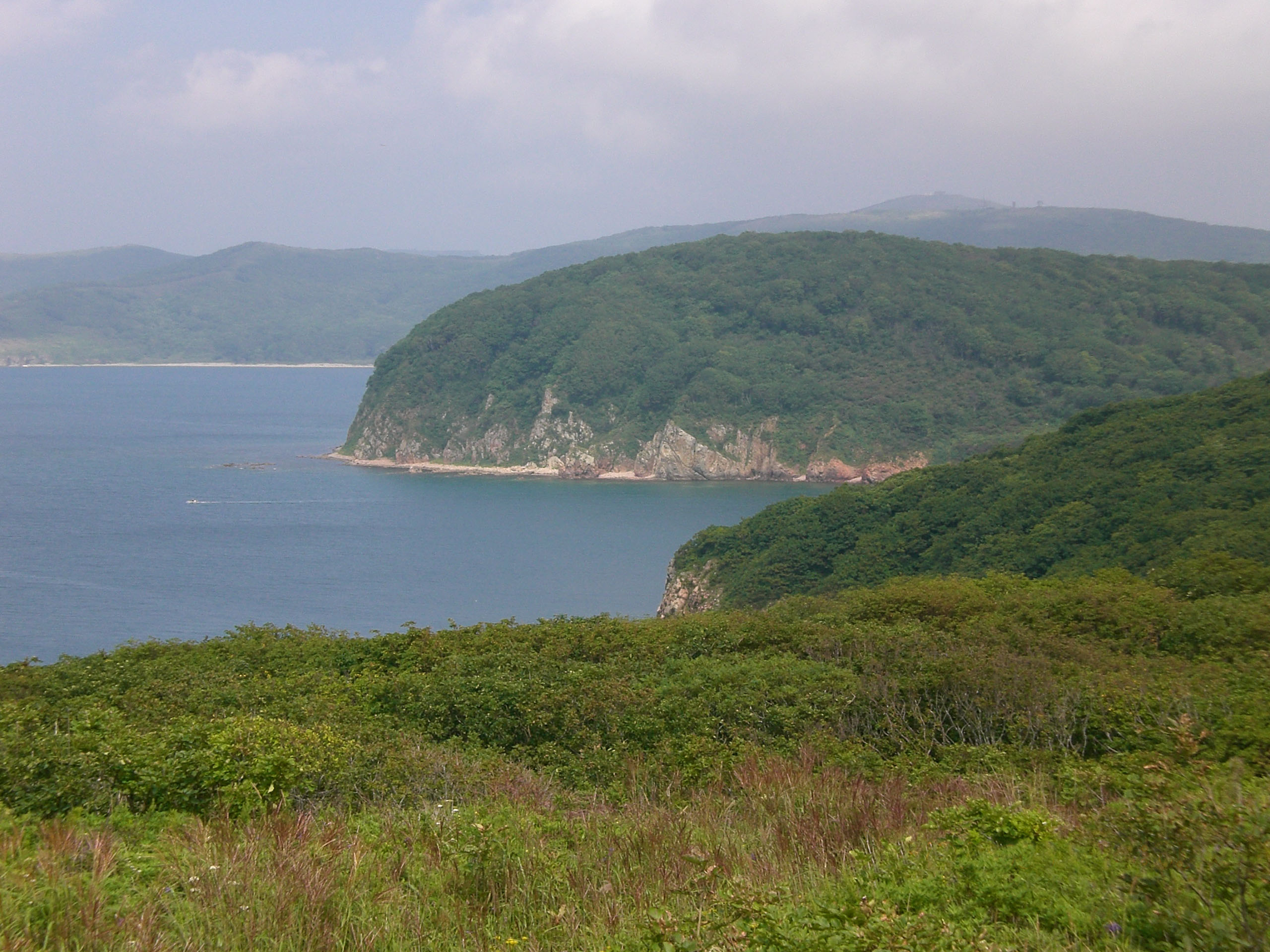
Shkot Island

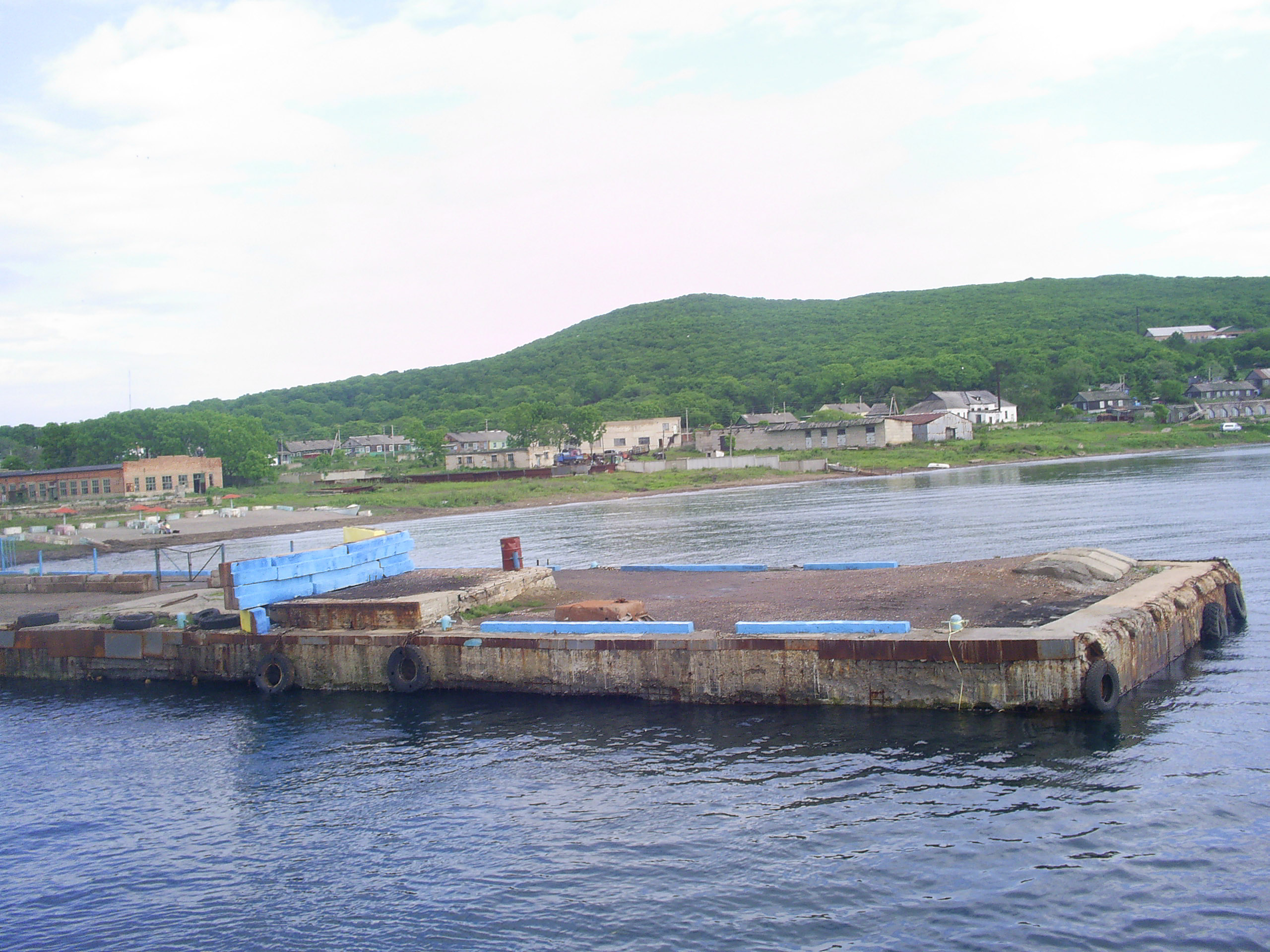
Popov Island

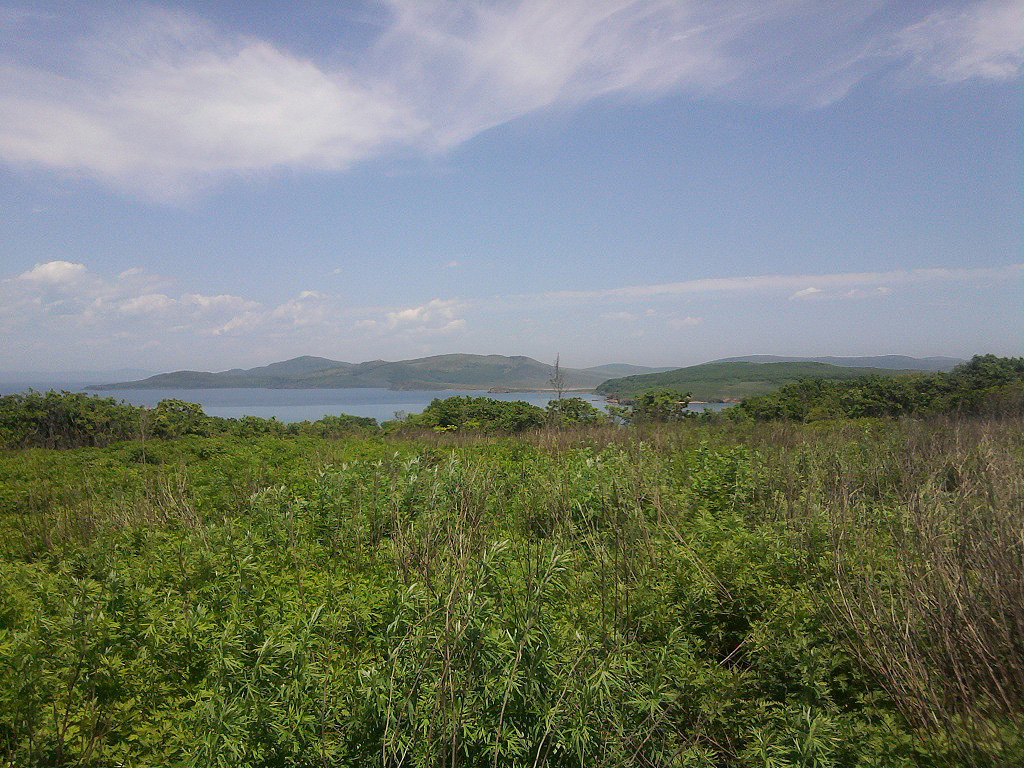
Reyneke Island

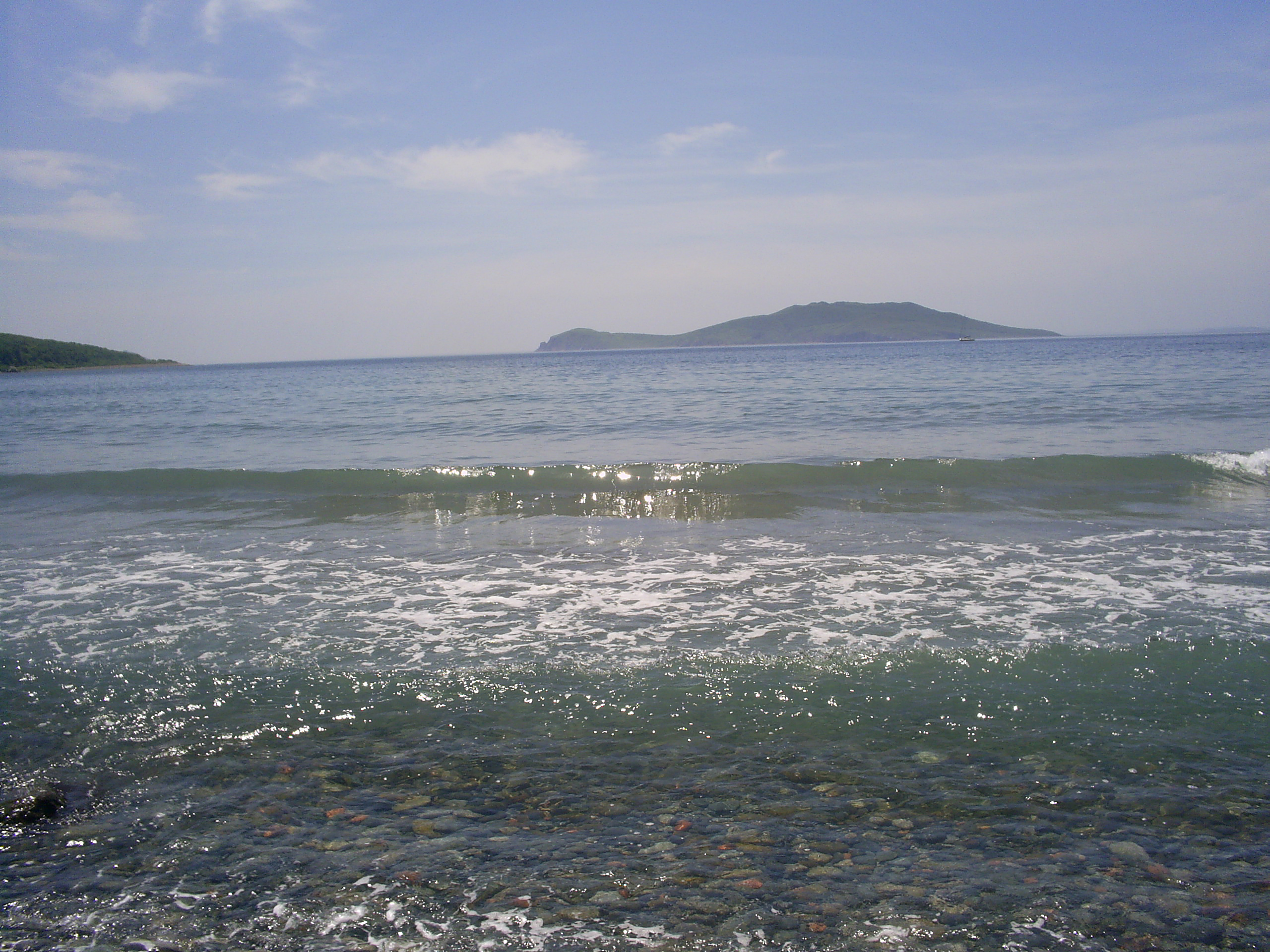
Rikord Island
