= Cape Povorotny =

Cape on the coast of the Sea of Japan in Russia

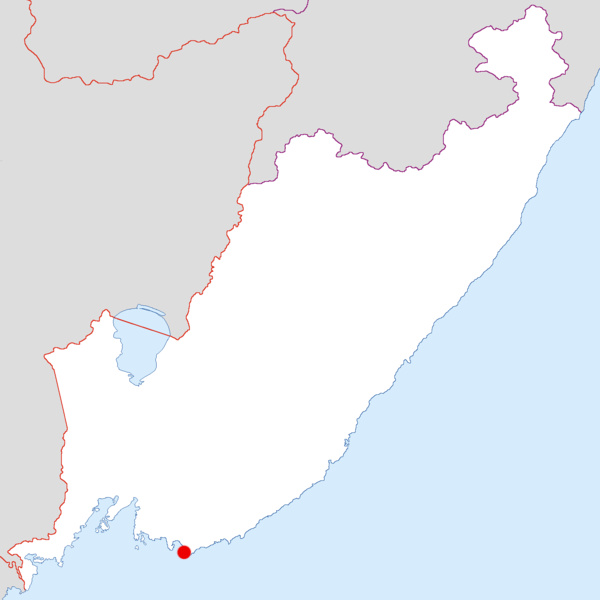
Cape Povorotny, Primorsky Krai.

Cape Povorotny (Russian: Мыс Поворотный, 42°40′38″N 133°2′33″E) is a cape on the coast of the Sea of Japan in Primorsky Krai, the Russian Far East.

There is a lighthouse on Cape Povorotny, which is administered from Nakhodka.

Temperature of sea water westerly and easterly from a cape differs in 3–6 °C.

== See also ==
- Pacific Coast of Russia
