= Reyneke Island =

Reyneke Island Остров Рейнеке
- Island
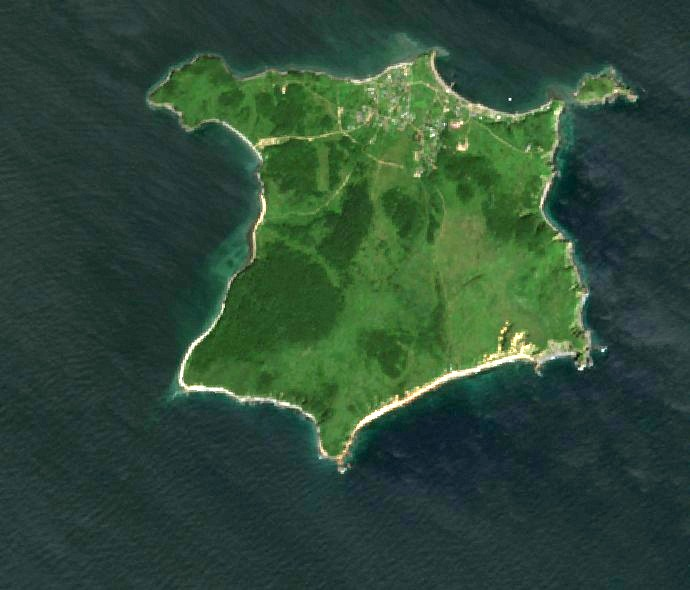
- Satellite image of Reyneke Island

- Location within Primorsky Krai
- Coordinates: 42°54′39″N 131°43′38″E
- Country: Russia
- Federal Subject: Primorsky Krai
- City: Vladivostok
- District: Pervomaisky District

Area
  - Total: 4.6 km^{2} (1.8 sq mi)

Population (2005)
  - Total: 23

Reyneke Island (Russian: Остров Рейнеке, Ostrov Reyneke) is an island in the Eugénie Archipelago within the Peter the Great Gulf of the Sea of Japan. It is administratively part of the city of Vladivostok in Primorsky Krai, Russia, and is located 25 kilometres (16 miles) south of the city center. Reyneke Island has an area of approximately 4.6 square kilometres (1.8 square miles) and a population of 23 (2005), making it the smallest of four inhabited islands of Primorsky Krai both by area and population. Most residents live in the island's single settlement of the same named located on the northern coast.

Reyneke Island is a summer recreation location for the Primorsky Krai region, and tourism is an important part of the local economy. The island is popular due to its pebbly and sandy beaches, the deciduous forest (oak, acer and tilia) on the western part of the island, and the meadows on the eastern part. Pinales of the Korean pine variety are found on the island. The islet of Vykent Island and many kekurs are found around the coast. Reyneke Island is connected to mainland Vladivostok by a ferry, operating three times a week in the warm seasons. In addition to tourism, the island is also a local center for fish processing.

Reyneke Island was named after Mikhail Reyneke, Vice Admiral of the Imperial Russian Navy and an early hydrographer of the Russian Hydrographic Service in the region.

== Features ==
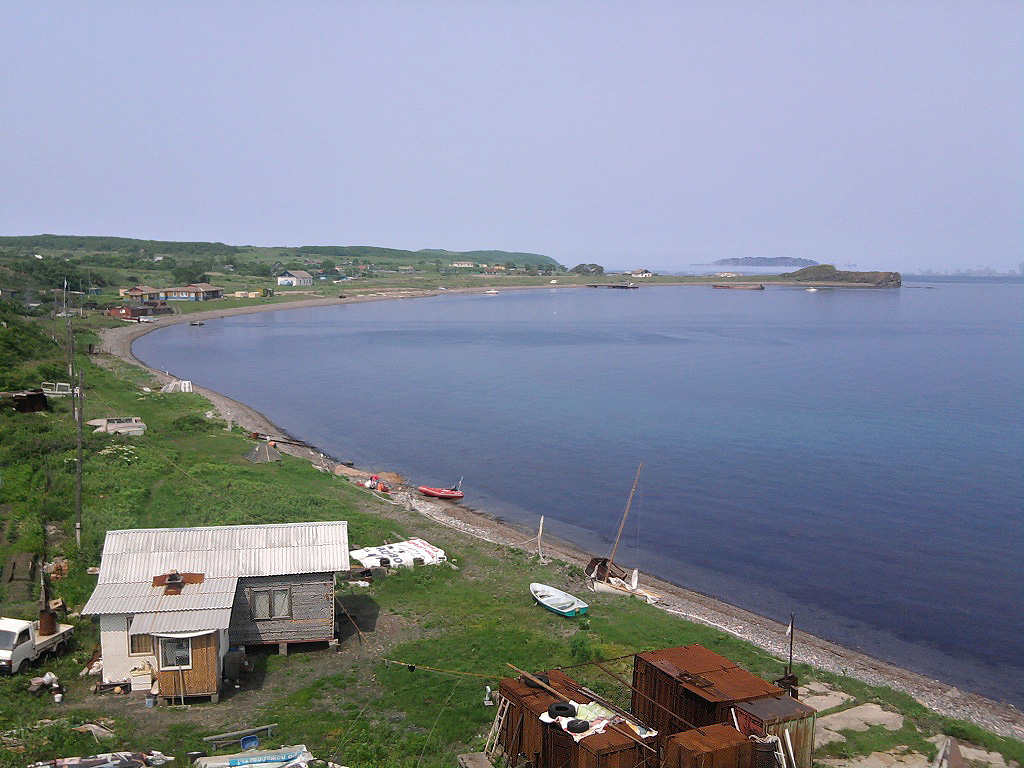
Viewing the settlement from Sopka's (hill) top

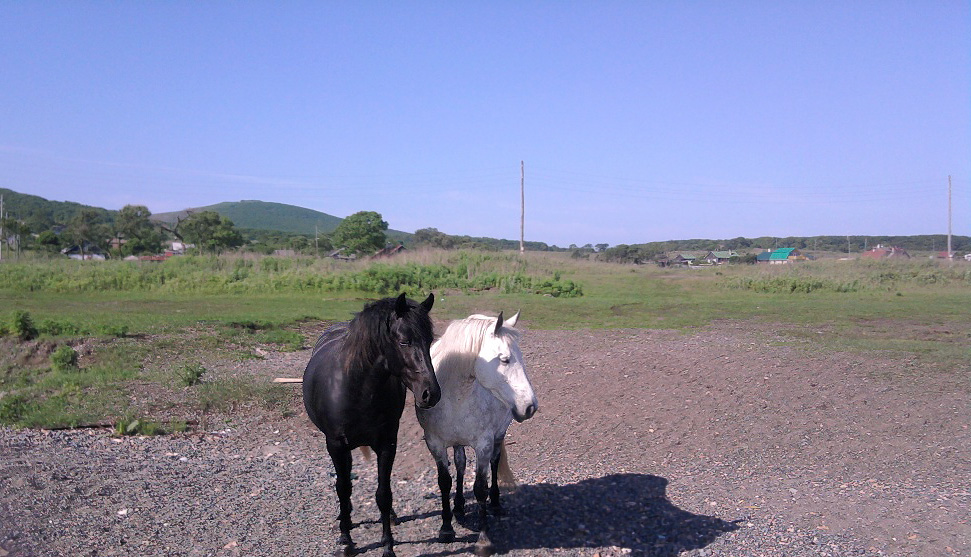
Two horses on Reyneke Island

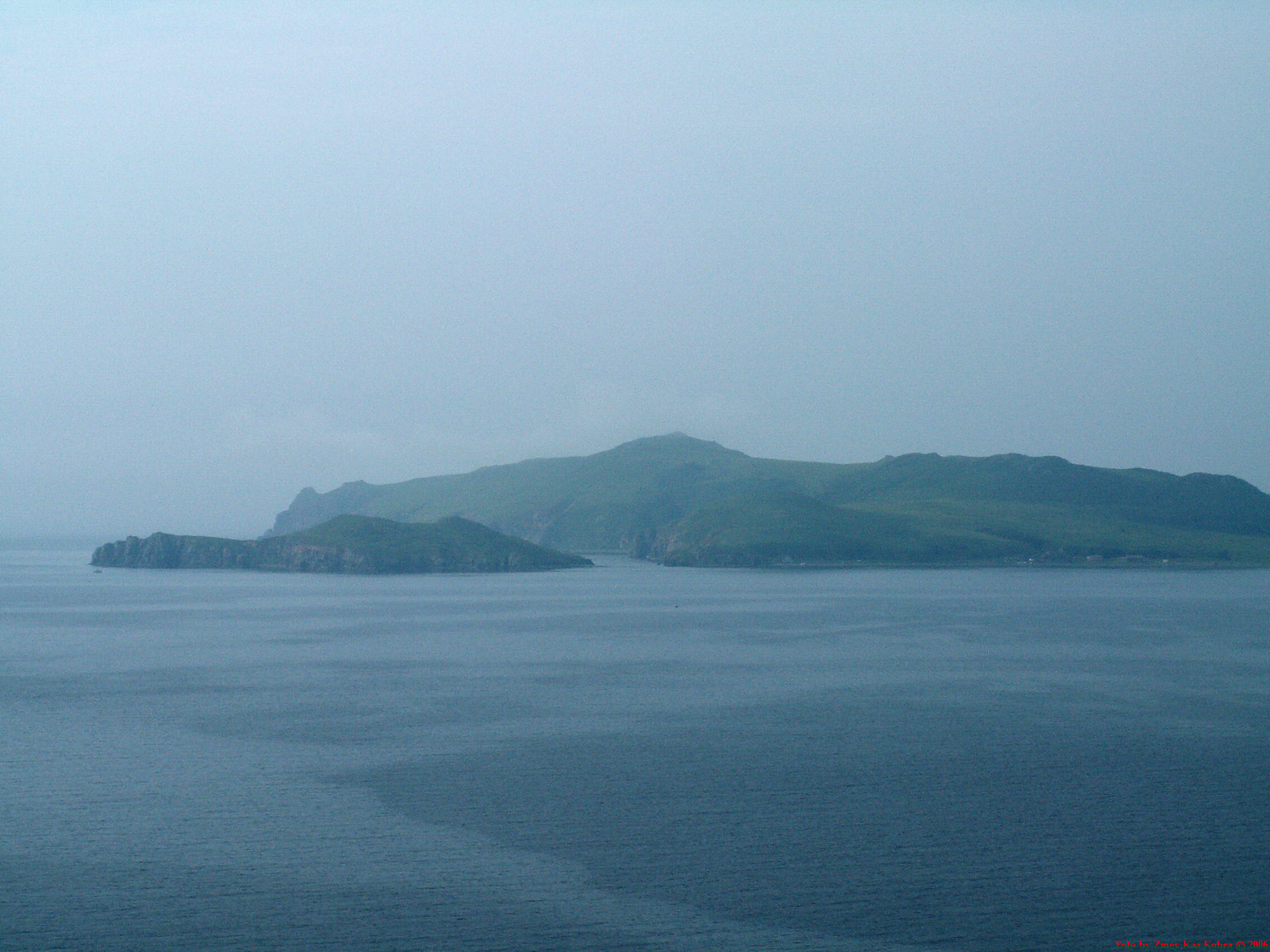
Reyneke Island (right and behind)

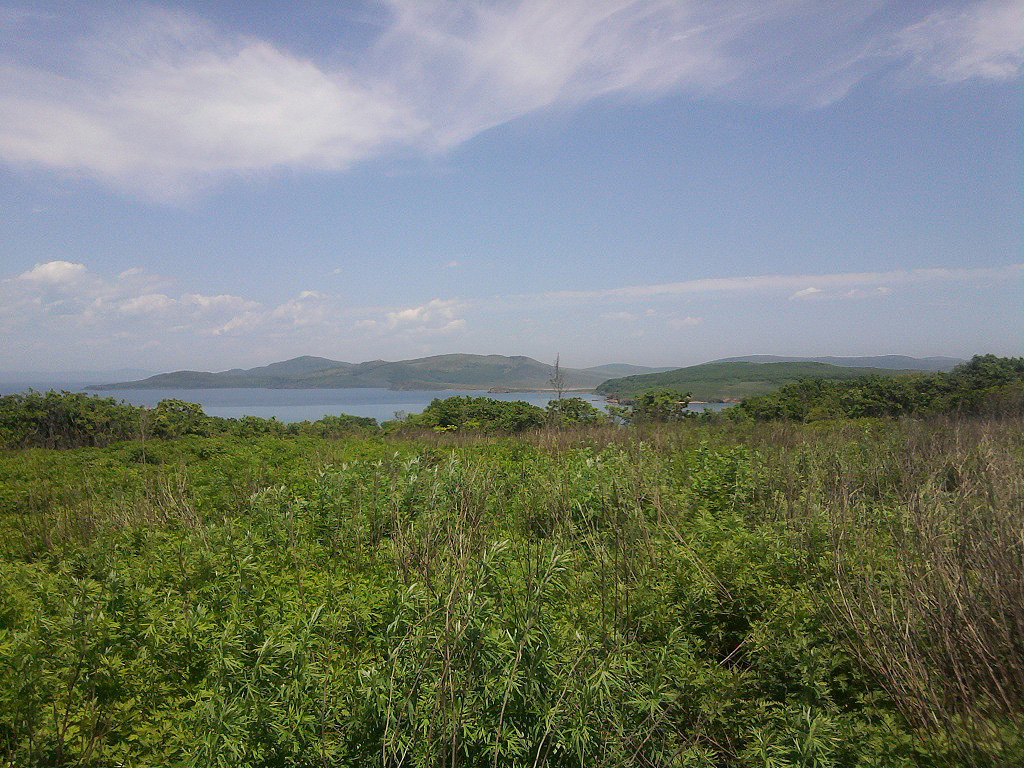
The landscape of Reyneke Island

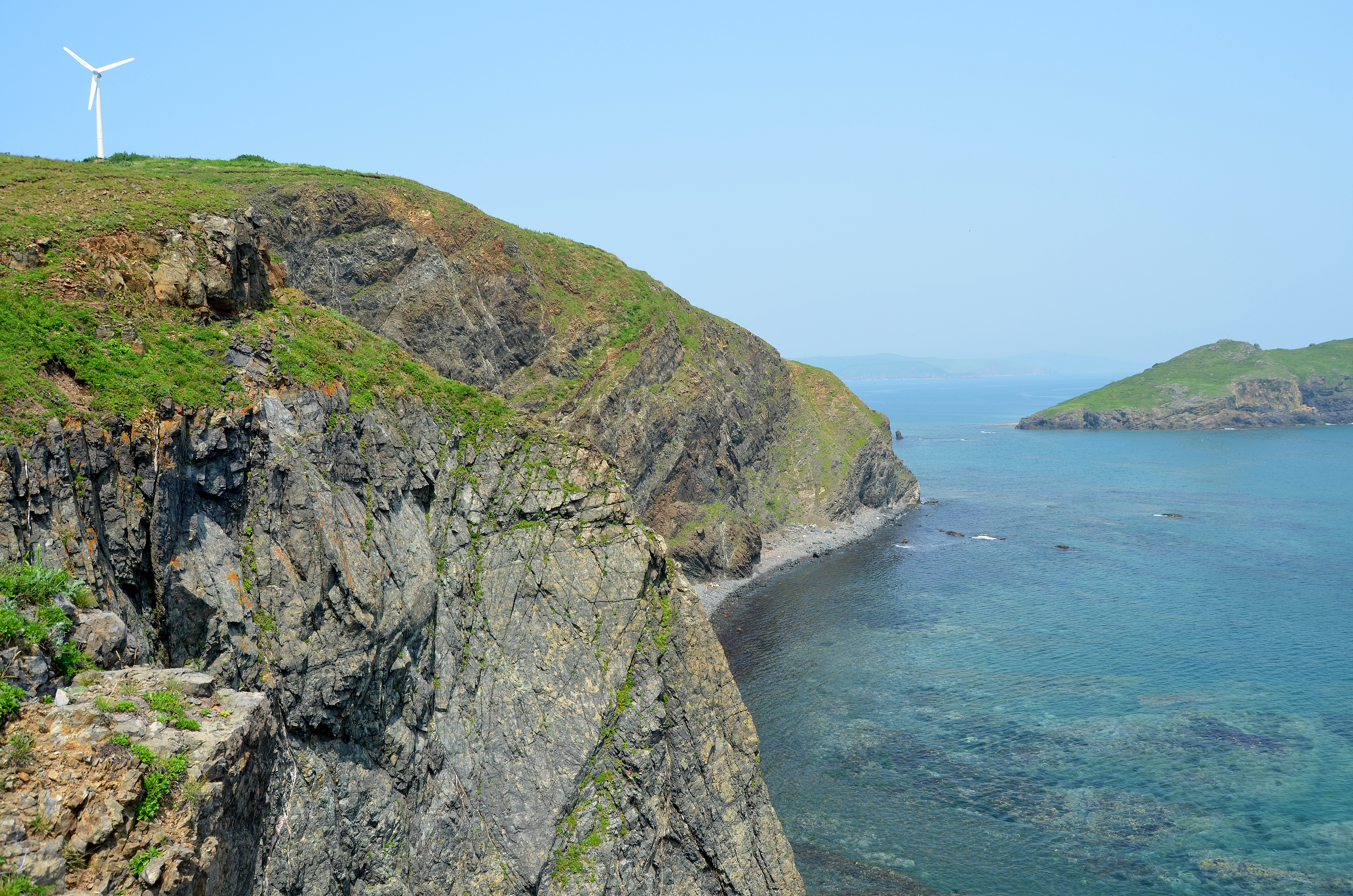
Wind turbine that provides electricity for the inhabitants of the Reyneke island
