= Peter the Great Gulf =

Gulf in Primorsky Krai, Russia

Coordinates: 42.632°N 131.779°E

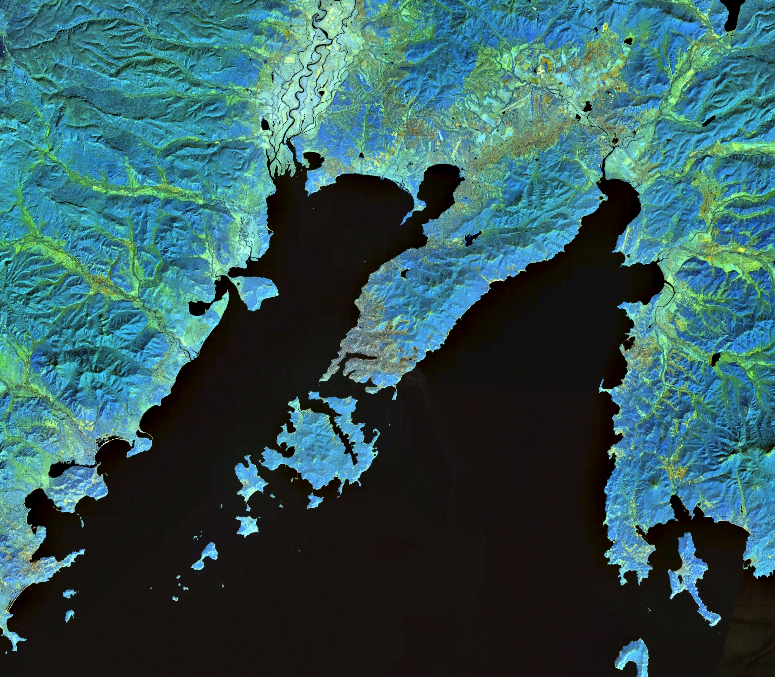
A topographic image of Peter the Great Gulf, centred on the Muravyov-Amursky Peninsula and the Eugénie Archipelago.

The Peter the Great Gulf (Russian: Залив Петра Великого) is a gulf on the southern coast of Primorsky Krai, Russia, and the largest gulf of the Sea of Japan. The gulf extends for 185 km (115 mi) from the Russian–North Korean border, at the mouth of the Tumen River in the west, across to Cape Povorotny in the east, and its bays reach 90 km (56 mi) inland. Vladivostok (the largest city and capital of Primorsky Krai) and Nakhodka (the third-largest city in the krai) are located along the Gulf coast.

== Geography and nature ==
The Peter the Great Gulf has a coastline of about 1,500 km (930 mi), with the largest bay of the gulf, at about 6,000 km^{2} (2,300 sq mi), divided by the Muravyov-Amursky Peninsula and the Eugénie Archipelago into the major bays of Amur Bay to the west and the Ussuri Bay to the east. The coast is indented by many smaller, minor bays, including Posyet Bay, Zolotoy Rog (the "Golden Horn") and Diomede Bay, in the west, Lazurnaya Bay (the "Shamora", with its sandy beaches), at the Muravyov-Amursky Peninsula, and Strelok, Vostok and Nakhodka Bays to the east. The functioning of these bays as harbours is severely limited by the freezing temperatures that occur from around early December to mid-April. The one exception is Nakhodka Bay, the only place on the Russian Pacific coast where the ocean typically doesn't freeze.

Peter the Great Gulf contains numerous islands, including the Rimsky-Korsakov Archipelago and Furugelm Island to the west, and Askold and Putyatin Islands to the east. The Eugénie Archipelago is separated from the Muravyov-Amursky Peninsula by the Eastern Bosphorus, which runs between Vladivostok and Russky Island, the largest island in the archipelago, and Primorsky Krai. In 2012, Russky Island was formally connected to the mainland by the Russky Bridge. Russky Island maintains natural populations of eastern roe deer, red fox (V. vulpes) and Siberian weasel. It is also home to several reptile species, including some venomous snakes, notably the Central Asian pit viper (Gloydius intermedius) and Ussuri mamushi (G. ussuriensis), as well as the Japanese keelback (Hebius vibakari) and the steppe ratsnake (Elaphe dione). Also found on the island is Dybowski's frog (Rana dybowskii), the Japanese tree frog (Hyla japonicus), oriental fire-bellied toad (Bombina orientalis), Sakhalin toad (Bufo sachalinensis) and the Siberian wood frog (Rana amurensis).

About 630 km^{2} (240 sq mi) of the gulf area is protected as the Far Eastern Marine Nature Reserve, also called the Dalnevostochny Morskoy Nature Reserve. Although most of the larger whales have become very rare in the area today—largely due to whaling and human activities in the region's waters—eight species of cetaceans are known to migrate into the gulf; common minke whales (Baelanoptera acuturostrata) often swim close to shore near coastal towns, and belugas (Delphinapterus leucas) are known to migrate to Rudnaya Bay in the north, with occasional appearances around Vladivostok. The gulf's coastline is also frequented by spotted seals (Phoca larga) and Steller sea lion (Eumetopias jubatus).

== History ==
Initially from 1855 the gulf was known as Victoria Bay, but in 1859 it was renamed to Peter the Great Gulf in honor of Tsar Peter the Great (r. 1682–1725). Russia founded the outpost of Vladivostok in June 1860, and acquired the entire Maritime Province (the present-day Primorsky Krai) under the provisions of the Treaty of Beijing in November 1860. The Manza War in 1868 marked the first major clash between Russians and Chinese - Manzy being the Russian name for Chinese people of the area at the time (Russian: Манзы). Hostilities broke out around Peter the Great Gulf when the Russians tried to shut off gold-mining operations and to expel 1000 Chinese workers who were employed near Vladivostok. The Chinese, not wanting to leave, resisted a Russian attempt to remove them from Askold Island. Afterwards, the Chinese raided two Russian Army military stations and three Russian villages in response.

A sailing regatta that annually takes place in the gulf is known as the Cup of the Peter the Great Gulf.

Between 5 and 12 July 2013 warships from the Russian Navy's Russian Pacific Fleet and from the People's Liberation Army Navy's North Sea Fleet participated in Joint Sea 2013 - bilateral naval maneuvers held in the Peter the Great Gulf. Joint Sea 2013 was the largest naval drill yet undertaken by the People's Liberation Army Navy with a foreign navy.
