= Amba =

Amba or AMBA may refer to:

== Title ==
- Amba Hor, alternative name for Abhor and Mehraela, Christian martyrs
- Amba Sada, also known as Psote, Christian bishop and martyr in Upper Egypt

== Given name ==
- Amba, the traditional first name given to the first daughter of the royal family in the Kingdom of Cochin, India
- Amba (Mahabharata), the eldest daughter of King of Kashi in the Hindu epic
- Amba Bongo, a writer and advocate for refugees from the Democratic Republic of the Congo
- Amba Etta-Tawo (born 1993), American football player
- Amba Prasad (businessman) (1860–1950), Indian businessman and philanthropist
- Sufi Amba Prasad (1858–1919), Indian nationalist and pan-Islamist leader
- Amba, one of the names of the Hindu goddess Durga
- Amba Shepherd, Australian singer and songwriter

== Languages ==
- Amba language (Solomon Islands), one of the three Utupua languages
- Amba language (Bantu), spoken by the Amba people of Uganda and the Democratic Republic of the Congo

== Places ==
- Amba (river), in Primorsky Krai, Russia
- Amba River (India), in Maharashtra, India
- Amba, Birbhum, a village in Birbhum district, West Bengal India
- Ambaji, a town in Gujarat, India
- Ambadagatti, a village in Karnataka, India

== AMBA ==
- Advanced Microcontroller Bus Architecture, an on-chip bus standard for System-on-Chip (SoC) designs
- Andelsselskab med begrænset ansvar (Limited Liability Cooperative), a type of business entity in Denmark
- Área Metropolitana de Buenos Aires, another name for Greater Buenos Aires
- Association of MBAs

== Other uses ==
- Amba (condiment), a tangy mango pickle condiment with sauce-like consistency
- Amba (film), 1990 Indian Bollywood film
- AMBA (animated film), 1994-1995 Russian animated film
- Amba (geology), a type of steep sided, flat topped mountain in Ethiopia
- Amba people of Uganda and the Democratic Republic of the Congo
- INS Amba (A54), a submarine tender ship formerly in service with the Indian Navy
- Amba, name given to the Siberian tiger by indigenous people in the Russian Far East
- Amba hotels, a brand owned by GLH Hotels
- Operation Amba, a Russian programme to curtail the poaching of Siberian tigers in the Russian Far East

== See also ==
- Ambar (disambiguation)
- Ambas (disambiguation)
