= Amber (disambiguation) =

Amber is a fossilized tree resin.

Amber may also refer to:

== Arts and entertainment ==
=== Film and television ===
- Amber (film), a 1952 Indian film
- Amber (TV series), an Irish TV series
- "Amber 31422," a 2010 episode of the TV series Fringe
- Amber Film & Photography Collective in Newcastle, England

=== Gaming ===
- Amber: Journeys Beyond, a 1996 point-and-click computer game
- Amber Diceless Roleplaying Game

=== Music ===
- Amber (band), a British acoustic world music band
- Amber (Dutch singer), stage name of Dutch electronic pop artist Marie-Claire Cremers (born 1969)
  - Amber (Amber album)
- Amber Bondin (born 1991), stage name Amber, Maltese-British singer
- Amber Liu (singer), a member of the South Korean girl group f(x), known by the mononym AMber
- Amber (Autechre album), 1994
- Amber (Clearlake album), 2006
- Amber, a 1987 album by Michael Jones and David Darling
- "Amber" (song), a song by 311 from their album From Chaos
- "Amber", a song on the album Volume 2: Release by Afro Celt Sound System
- "Amber", a song on the album The Hope Division by Stick to Your Guns
- "Amber", a song from the album Gemini Rights by Steve Lacy

=== Novels ===
- Amber, a world in The Chronicles of Amber, a fantasy novel series written by Roger Zelazny

== Places ==
=== India ===
- Amber, India (also known as Amer)
- Kingdom of Amber, a historical name for Jaipur State, India

=== United Kingdom ===
- River Amber, Derbyshire, England
  - Amber Valley, Derbyshire, England

=== United States ===
- Amber, Iowa
- Amber, Oklahoma
- Amber, Washington
- Amber Township, Michigan
- Amber Lake, Martin County, Minnesota
- Amber Lake, Amber, Washington

=== Other places ===
- Amber, Queensland, Australia, a locality in the Shire of Mareeba
- Amber Mountain (Alberta), Canada
- Amber Mountain National Park, Madagascar

== Science ==
=== Computing ===
- AMBER, a molecular dynamics force field and software package
- Amber (processor core)
- Amber Smalltalk, a dialect of the Smalltalk programming language
- An Amiga computer chip

=== Other science ===
- AMBER (Very Large Telescope)
- Amber mutation, a type of stop codon in genetics
- A unit of volume according to the Winchester measure

== Transportation ==
- Amber Highway, the official name of A1 autostrada (Poland)
- Amber Road, an ancient trade route from the North and Baltic Seas to the Mediterranean Sea
- EV9 The Amber Route, a cycling route between the Baltic and Adriatic Seas

== Other uses ==
- Amber (Bible)
- Amber (color)
- Amber (given name) (including a list of people with the name)
- Amber (cheetah), shown in the series Big Cat Diary
- Amber (restaurant), a restaurant in Hong Kong
- Tropical Storm Amber (disambiguation)
- Amber ale
- Amber alert, a child abduction alert bulletin
- Amber language, a language of eastern Indonesia
- USS Amber (PYc-6), a U.S. Navy patrol boat
- Amber Moon Productions, nonprofit in Lexington, Kentucky

== See also ==
- Amber Room (disambiguation)
- Ambar (disambiguation)
- Ambre (disambiguation)
