= Ambar =

Ambar may refer to:

- Hambar, a Balkan or Central European building for drying maize
- Arda (Middle-earth), a fictional name of Earth in J. R. R. Tolkien's stories
- AmBAR, American Business Association of Russian Professionals
- Ambar - Ideas on Paper S.A., a Portuguese company
- Ambar, Bismil, a village in Turkey
- Ambar, Khyber Pakhtunkhwa, a village in Pakistan
- Amber (film), a 1952 Indian film

== See also ==
- Amba (disambiguation)
- Amber (disambiguation)
- Ambara, a 2013 Indian film
