= Amba River =

Amba River may refer to:

- Amba River (India), river in Maharashtra, India
- Amba (river), river in Primorsky Krai, Russia
