= Shkotovka =

River in Primorsky Krai, Russia

Location
- Country: Russia

Physical characteristics
- Source
  - location: South Sikhote-Alin
  - elevation: 760 m (2,490 ft)
- Mouth: Sea of Japan
  - location: Ussuri Bay
  - coordinates: 43°17′42″N 132°20′24″E
  - elevation: 0 m (0 ft)
- Length: 59 km (37 mi)
- Basin size: 714 km^{2} (276 sq mi)

The Shkotovka (Russian: Шкотовка, formerly: Цимухе Tsimukhe) is a river in Primorsky Krai, Russia. It is 59 kilometers (37 mi) long, with the drainage basin area of 714 square kilometers (276 sq mi). It rises in the south of the Sikhote-Alin range (Bolshoy Vorobey Range) and flows into the Ussuri Bay of the Sea of Japan near the urban-type settlement of Shkotovo.

It was named after Nikolay Shkot in 1972. The former name of river was Tsimukhe (Qimu River).

The localities of Shkotovo, Novorossiya, Tsentralnoye, and Novaya Moskva stand on the river's bank.
