= Ambas =

Ambas may refer to:

- Ambás (disambiguation), a number of civil parishes in Spain
- Ambas Bay, Cameroon
- Ambas Gorge and Waterfall, in Crete

== See also ==
- Amba (disambiguation)
