= Terrestricythere =

Scientific classification
- Kingdom: Animalia
- Phylum: Arthropoda
- Class: Ostracoda
- Order: Podocopida
- Family: Terrestricytheridae
- Genus: Terrestricythere; Schornikov, 1969

Genus of crustaceans

Terrestricythere is a genus of crustaceans belonging to the monotypic family Terrestricytheridae. The first known species Terrestricythere ivanovae Schornikov, 1969 was described from the North Western Pacific Kuril Islands, between Japan and the Kamchatka Peninsula of Russia. The second, Terrestricythere pratenesis Schornikov, 1980 was found in Russia (near Vladivostok, Amur Gulf, in the Sea of Japan), alongside a second population of T. ivanovae. Another, Terrestricythere proboscidis Hiruta, Hiruta & Mawatari, 2007 was subsequently found years later around Japan (Sea of Japan). Together, this distribution reflects coastal regions of the North Western Pacific. Meanwhile, another species was unexpectedly discovered in the United Kingdom by Horne et al. 2004. They discuss the potential transport by migrating birds, but also possibly introduction to north-west Europe by military vehicles from the north-west Pacific during World War II. This study also mentions two specimens from a lake in France (citing Scharf & Keyser, 1991) which they do not consider to be adequate evidence of a viable population. Soon after, a fifth species was described from the Black Sea around the Crimean Peninsula

As of June 2019, the genus contains five species:

- Terrestricythere crimaea Schornikov & Syrtlanova, 2008
- Terrestricythere elisabethae Horne, Smith, Whittaker & Murray, 2004
- Terrestricythere ivanovae Schornikov, 1969
- Terrestricythere pratenesis Schornikov, 1980
- Terrestricythere proboscidis Hiruta, Hiruta & Mawatari, 2007

== Ecology ==
Terrestricythere ivanovae was described from specimens from the supralittoral zone of Iturup Island (Kuril Islands), according to Horne et al. 2004, they were "found living among small pebbles that are kept constantly damp by mist, rain and sea spray". Terrestricythere pratenesis was found in a monsoonal salt marsh with brackish groundwater, whist others were found among supralittoral salt-tolerant plants and littoral filamentous algae - very close to where some later specimens of Terrestricythere ivanovae had been found. Those of Terrestricythere elisabethae were either found in an intertidal rockpool, or in a tidal estuarine tributary
