= Reliance Cricket Stadium =

Cricket stadium

- IPCL Stadium
- Interactive map of Reliance Cricket Stadium

Ground information
- Location: Nagothane, Maharashtra
- Country: India
- Establishment: 1998
- Capacity: 2,000
- End names
- n/a

Team information
Maharashtra cricket team	(1998–)
- As of 26 August, 2015; Source: Ground profile

Reliance Cricket Stadium is cricket stadium in Nagothane, Maharashtra. Previously, the stadium was known as Indian Petrochemicals Corporation Limited Ground. The ground owned by Reliance Industries.

The stadium is one of the small-town venues in Maharashtra which has hosted two Ranji Trophy games in December, 2007 where host Maharashtra played against Delhi and Saurashtra. It has hosted one Ranji Trophy One Day in 1997/98 between Maharashtra and Baroda.

In the first decade of 2000, it hosted many matches in Vizzy Trophy, Polly Umrigar Trophy, Vinoo Mankad Trophy, Vijay Merchant Trophy and Cooch Behar Trophy. Since then the stadium has local level matches only.

On 12 March 2018, Australia defeated India in the Women's ODI at this stadium which drew huge crowds. Even MS Dhoni played here in 2009.
