= Rawal (caste) =

Community in Rajasthan and Gujarat

Rawal is an Indian community from Rajasthan and Gujarat. They are known as priests of devi temples and perform a form of dance known as Rammat during the worship. They were well respected and patronised by the Charans.

They are also referred to as Raul or Rawaliya and found predominantly across the states of Gujarat, Rajasthan, Maharashtra, Karnataka, and Punjab. Historically, members of the community were prominent as bards. While a section of the community practices agriculture or weaving, others engage in religious mendicancy, carrying a trishula (trident) in the morning while singing devotional songs.

== Demographics and regional occupations ==
Occupational practices and social traditions within the Rawal community vary by region:

- Rajasthan: In Rajasthan, community members form 12-member performing groups (phad) that travel across villages to showcase music and dance performances.
- Punjab: In Punjab, the Rawal population is mostly Muslim and is also referred to as Jogi. Members sing devotional songs while seeking alms, with some practicing as traditional physicians (hakim) or astrologers. The name of the city Rawalpindi is believed to be derived from the Rawal community. During Muharram, they narrate stories and miracles of the Prophet Muhammad and sing songs praising him.
- Western Khandesh: The Rawals of Western Khandesh trace their origins to a migration from Chittorgarh and Mount Abu around the 12th century. The title "Rawal" is considered a designation for the head male of the family, and young boys are addressed as Kunwar, indicating possible historical ties to Rajput lineages. Their exogamous clan systems (gotra) resemble those of the Rajputs. Most community members in this region engage in agriculture, with some holding historically granted lands (inam).

== Sub-divisions and social structure ==
The community consists of distinct regional sub-divisions and lineages:

- In Gujarat, the Rawal community is organized into seven sub-divisions, including Bariya, Bhaliya, and Sarkhiya. Common surnames include Parmar, Chauhan, Vaniya, Pataliya, Gadhediya, and Horanchi. Villages are organized into administrative groups of 10 to 12 villages, and endogamous marriage rules mandate that alliances be formed strictly within one's designated village group.
- In Maharashtra, common community surnames include Chavan, Chhatrabhuj, Lake, Powar, Gaikwad, Jadhav, and Kavad. Marriages between individuals sharing the same surname are prohibited.
- In Western Khandesh, the community is divided into a reported 96 sub-divisions, including Chavan, Chit, Dhaval, Dorik, Jadhav, Kumbhe, Parmar, and Solanki.

== Religious practices ==
The religious traditions of the Rawal community include the veneration of various Hindu deities and regional figures:

- Community members generally worship Mahadeva (Shiva), the trishula, Bairoba (along with his silver plaques or tak), Devi, and Khandoba. Common household shrines contain idols of Bairoba, Bhavani of Tuljapur, the goddess of Chaturshringi, Gorakhnath, Khandoba, and Matsyendranath.
- In Gujarat and associated regions, deities such as Mahakali, Amba, Bahuchara, and Hinglaj are worshipped.
- In Western Khandesh, members worship Mahadeva, Ganesha, Vithoba, Krishna, Devi, Khandoba (Ravandoba), and the trishula. Religious ceremonies are performed by South Indian (Dakshina) or Gujarati Brahmin priests, while Gosavis serve as religious gurus. Among the Chit and Dorik sub-castes, young boys undergo the sacred thread ceremony (munj).

== Marriage customs ==
=== Gujarat ===
In Gujarat, marriage negotiations begin with the bride's father visiting the groom's household. If approved, the groom's father pays a bride price of approximately 40 rupees. An astrologer calculates the auspicious time for the ceremony. Three, five, seven, or nine days prior to the wedding, an idol of Ganesha is consecrated at both households, accompanied by nightly songs sung by women. On the wedding day, the couple hold right hands, exchange garlands, circumambulate the sacred fire five times, and feed each other five morsels of sweet flour balls (ladoo). Widow remarriage is permitted. Men may divorce freely, but women require husband consent for divorce. Divorced women are permitted to remarry.

=== Maharashtra ===
In Maharashtra, marriage preparations begin two to four days prior to the wedding, when turmeric paste, a green saree, and forehead ornaments (mundavalya) are sent from the groom's home to the bride. On the second day, a goat is sacrificed as part of the devak deity ritual, followed by a feast. On the wedding day, the groom rides a horse to a Maruti temple, where he receives a new turban and bag before proceeding to the bride's house. During the ceremony, an interim curtain (antarpat) is placed between the bride and groom while the priest chants auspicious stanzas (mangalashtaka). Once removed, the marriage is solemnized, followed by an evening feast.

=== Western Khandesh ===
In Western Khandesh, widow remarriage is not permitted. Marriages with maternal cross-cousins (maternal uncle's daughter) are allowed, whereas marriages with paternal aunt's or maternal aunt's daughters are forbidden. Prior to the wedding, a sugar engagement ceremony (sakar puda) is held, during which the groom's family presents sugar to the bride. During the main ceremony, after the removal of the antarpat, the couple hold hands and feed each other five morsels of flour ladoos. Chit and Dorik Rawals do not wear forehead ornaments (bashing) during the wedding.

== Death rituals ==
Funeral customs depend on regional and sub-caste traditions:

- Gujarat and general traditions: The deceased are buried in a sitting posture facing south. On the twelfth day following death, a rice-flour lamp is lit in the evening, and wheat, rice, flowers, and fruits are placed on a wooden stool for an all-night vigil.
- Maharashtra: Sacred water and cow urine are poured into the mouth of the deceased. The body is placed on a bamboo frame (kondya) and carried to the burial ground, where it is buried facing east. The chief mourner pours water into the mouth using an earthen vessel, after which salt and soil are placed over the body, and a tomb is erected. On the third day, rice and vegetables are offered at the burial site. On the eleventh day, a flower garland, copper vessel, and flour lamp are hung from a rafter, followed by a goat sacrifice. A relative is believed to be possessed by the spirit of the deceased to express final wishes; when the possessed person falls unconscious, the soul is believed to have reached heaven. Annual memorial rites (Śrāddha) are performed, often on Naga Panchami or Dussehra.
- Western Khandesh: Both cremation and burial are practiced. Water is poured into the deceased's mouth using a banyan or sacred fig leaf. On the eleventh day, a small pit is dug at the place of death to bury a live fish. Rice is arranged in a circle around the pit, eleven lamps and eleven flatbreads (bhakri) are offered, and worship rituals are performed. Annual shraddha and mahalaya rites are observed for ancestors.

== Origin ==
The Rawals claim to be converted from Brahmins around the 12th century.

== History ==
Rawals would wander from village to village to present night-long Rammat performances in the temples.

== Rammat of Rawal ==
Rawals are known for their performances called Rammat, which are devotional in nature dedicated to their patron goddess. It begins with a prayer to the goddess after which the performing arena is marked with a sword. This Rammat tradition is thought to be ‘almost extinct’ in modern times.

Mahendra Bhanawat in the study of folk theatre traditions of Rajasthan, states about the origin of Ramat:

“Rawals of Rajasthan who visit their distinguished clients (Charan Yajamans) for gifts (virats) would impersonate in various disguises (Swangs) and perform various acts of entertainments-called Ramats. I was told on enquiry that the Rawals, in earlier times, would impersonate the goddesses they worshipped during Navaratras and would sing devotional songs (Charjayen) to the accompaniment of mridanga, taal and rawaj etc. With the passage of time, they started playing kheras in front of Charans also and presented different impersonations(swangs). For a Khera performance, a boy would dress up like the goddess and another boy in his female garb would present various Charjas throughout the night laced with songs, dance and drums. These devotional performances came to be known as Ramats.”

== Genealogists ==
Rawals are one of the castes who acted as genealogists for the Charans.

== Modern occupations ==
Presently, Rawals are mainly engaged in cultivation and in the weaving of coarse cotton cloth and tapes.

== Population ==
According to the 1961 Census, the Rawal population in Rajasthan was approximately 4,500.

== See also ==
- Motisar
