= Chirja =

Devotional song

"Chirja" (Devanagari: चिरजा) is a devotional song in Rajasthani and Gujarati literature as a prayer to the female form of divine, Shakti. Chirja is a new poetic form in Shakti-Kavya (Shaktik poetry) in Rajasthani literature. Chirjas are primarily sung by women especially during Jagrans (night awakenings) during the worship of goddess. The word Chirja is derived from the Sanskrit term Charya.

== Etymology ==
The word Chirja is derived from the Sanskrit term Charya. The Sanskrit word 'Charya' means performance of religious rites and practices, worthy of wandering ascetics, such as meditation, penance, etc. The Prakrit lexicons cover 'conduct' and 'religiou rituals' under the meaning of the word 'Chariya'. In Rajasthani lexicons, 'Charya' stands for prayer to the goddess sung in musical modes.In the Mahayana Buddhism, 'Charya' indicates the whole range of practices observed to help achieve the ultimate goal, Nirvana. In the 'Vajrayana' branch, however, 'Charya' denotes 'Tantrika' performances when some "padas' were sung which came to be known as 'Charya pada' or 'Charyagiti'.

== Types ==
Chirjas are of two types: Sagau Chirja and Chadau Chirja. Sagau Chirja are devotional and praise the goddess in eulogical terms while Chadau Chirja are sung in the time of need, to rescue the devotees from ailments and difficulties through divine assistance from the goddess.

A large number of Chirjas have been composed mainly by the Charans, Rajputs, and Rawals. Rawals of Rajasthan are well known for utilising Chirjas in their religious performances. Chirjas are popularly sung for Hindu goddesses like Avad Mata(Swangiya Mata) and Karni Mata.
