= Shkotovo =

Coordinates: 43°19′N 132°21′E

Shkotovo (Russian: Шко́тово) is an urban locality (an urban-type settlement) and a railway station in Shkotovsky District of Primorsky Krai, Russia. Population: 5,038 (2010 census); 5,348 (2002 census); 7,721 (1989 Soviet census).

== History ==
It was founded in 1865 as a village at the mouth of the Tsymukhe River (now Shkotovka River) on the Ussuri Bay and was granted urban-type settlement status in 1931. It is named after Nikolay Shkot.

== Economy ==
There are a car repair service, a tinned food plant, and a dairy factory in Shkotovo.
