= Novaya Moskva, Primorsky Krai =

Village in Shkotovsky District, Primorsky Krai, Russia

Coordinates: 43°21′N 132°45′E

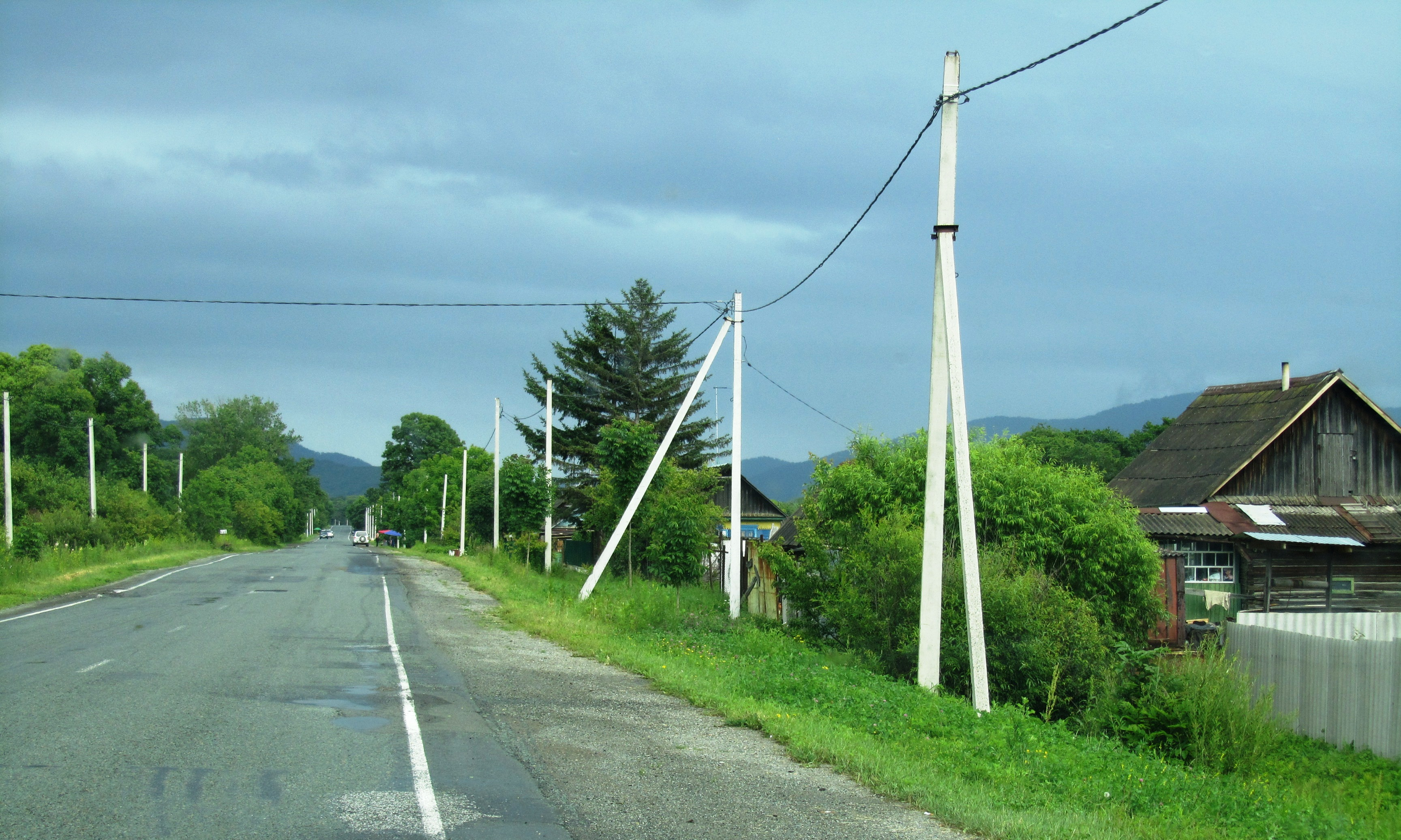
Novaïa Moskva, Primorié

Novaya Moskva (Russian: Но́вая Москва́, lit. New Moscow) is a rural locality (a village) in Shkotovsky District of Primorsky Krai, Russia. It is located on the Shkotovka River. The population was estimated at 114 in 2005.
