= Ambre Hammond =

Australian classical pianist

Ambre Hammond (born in Cairns) is an Australian classical pianist and composer.

== Life ==
Hammond has been taught by her mother, Carolyn Hammond, since the age of three. In 1989, Hammond achieved a world record when she was awarded her AMEB Associate Diploma at the age of 11 and Licentiate Diploma at the age of 12 in the same year. At 16, Hammond won first prize in an international music competition in Córdoba, Argentina. In 1994, Hammond made her debut performance with the Orquesta Sinfonica De Córdoba where her performance of the Rachmaninoff Piano Concerto No. 3 was recorded live. She recorded a CD titled Devotion - Piano works of Franz Liszt at the age of 16, which includes Réminiscences de Norma (Bellini), Mephisto Waltz No. 1, Après une lecture de Dante and Wilde Jagd.

Hammond has performed both solo and with orchestras in Australia, East Timor, Thailand, India, Europe (England, Italy, Poland, Spain, Switzerland, Belarus), North America, and South America. She has performed with the SBS Youth Orchestra, the Australian Chamber Orchestra, the Metropolitan Orchestra, the Fribourg Youth Orchestra and the Orchestra of the City in London.

In 2009, a CD of music by various classical composers titled 'Reverie' was released (recorded at James Morrison Studios).

Lalo Schifrin, a renowned Hollywood film score writer, has composed a double concerto for Ambre Hammond and trumpeter James Morrison. It was premiered on 19 July 2007 at the Sydney Opera House with the Sydney Symphony; the concert was later broadcast on ABC Television.

Together with accordion virtuoso Marcello Maio, Ambre released 'Oblivion' – music of Astor Piazzolla in 2012. It was named "the ultimate seduction album" by John Shand (The Sydney Morning Herald).

Ambre is the founder and presenter of Girl Piano Truck, a project involving traveling with a piano or keyboard giving concerts in schools and orphanages in underprivileged and remote areas. The project was launched in 2013. Ambre has taken the project to India, East Timor, Thailand, Belarus, the Philippines and Africa.

During her tour with James Morrison, John Morrison & His Trio, Emma Pask and Ian Cooper for the Queensland Music Festival in July 2015, Ambre played Fantasy on a Mozart Theme, Hungarian Rhapsody and was in the premiere of Matthew Dewey's 'Symphony of the Inland Sea' with the Mount Isa Symphony Orchestra, the Mount Isa Community Choir and Combined Schools Choir.

In 2016 Ambre released her first album of original compositions titled 'Akasha'. A piece titled 'Clancy' from this album was used in a visual piece representing the Rio Olympics aired on Channel 7 in Australia and internationally.

In June 2018 Ambre released the first single 'Red Rose' from her second album of original compositions for solo piano 'Night Flowers'.
