= Amur Bay Bridge =

Bridge in Vladivostok, Primorsky Krai, Russia

Coordinates: 43°14′48″N 131°57′51″E

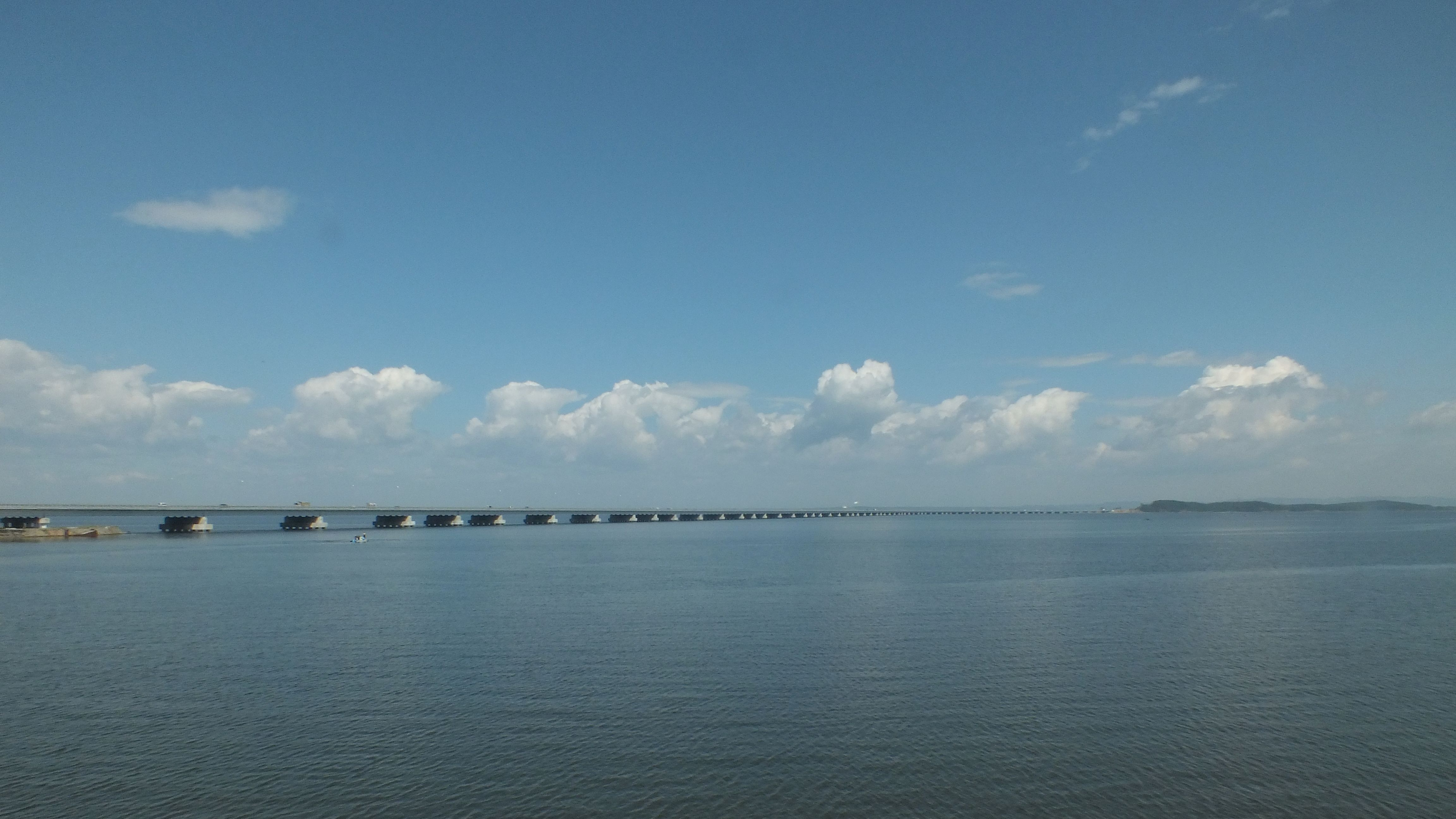
The Amur Bay Bridge in Vladivostok, Russia, over Amur Bay

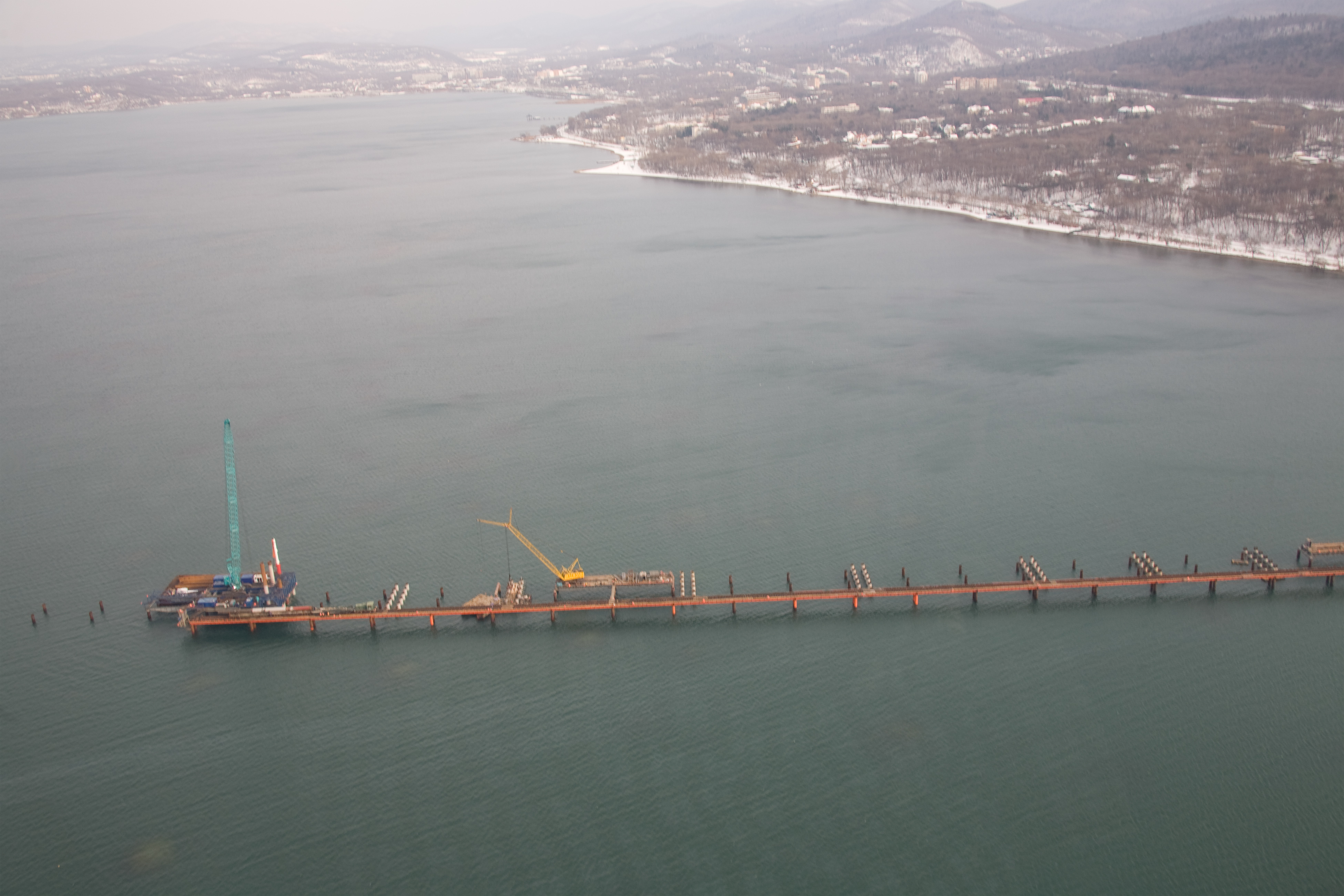
The construction of the Amur Bay Bridge proceeds from the De Friz Peninsula.

The Amur Bay Bridge (Russian: Мост через Амурский залив) is the low-water bridge in Vladivostok, Russia, that connects the De Frieze Peninsula with the vicinity of the Sedanka microdistrict (микрорайон Седанка) of the Muravyov-Amursky Peninsula, and is part of the highway “Novy Village (Новый) - Peninsula De Friz (Де-Фриз) - Sedanka Station (Седанка) - Patroclus Bay (Патрокл)”. It is one of the three large bridges completed for the 2012 APEC Summit in Vladivostok, the other two being the Russky Bridge and the Zolotoy Bridge.

== Project history ==
The construction of the bridge commenced in November 2009 in anticipation of the APEC Leaders' Meeting in Vladivostok in 2012. The Pacific Bridge Construction Company («Тихоокеанская мостостроительная компания») served as the main contractor for the project. The bridge was officially opened and put into operation on August 11, 2012. Serving as a crucial component of Federal Highway A370, the bridge now connects the cities of Khabarovsk and Vladivostok, providing a vital link for transportation and facilitating easier access between the two locations.

== Design ==
The bridge is a type of trestle structure that crosses over the sea at a height of just a few meters above the water. This is why it is commonly referred to as a low-water bridge, as the clearance underneath is only six meters high, making it impossible for even small boats to pass through. During inclement weather conditions, individuals crossing the bridge can experience the full impact of the sea's powerful forces and witness the waves crashing against the bridge supports.

The bridge builders faced the challenge of driving piles into the bottom of the Amur Bay, with the longest pile being 55 meters and the shortest being 23 meters. Only a few super-powerful pile driving hammers were able to handle this task, with limited availability in Primorye and the rest of the country. For instance, the hammer used for the main bridge piles weighs 46 tonnes, with its striking part weighing 28 tonnes. Operating on a principle similar to an artillery shot, this Dutch equipment is capable of driving both horizontal and inclined piles effectively.

The span was carefully moved along the supports, a distance of two kilometers on either side. To facilitate this process, custom slipways were constructed and the various parts of the span were securely welded together. Following rigorous ultrasonic testing, the permanent formwork and reinforced concrete slabs that would make up the carriageway structure were laid on top. This entire assembly of span structure components was then transported from De-Friz and Sedanka to the 36th pillar, where they were finally assembled and connected.

During the construction project, three out of the six cross-section beams were simultaneously driven in both directions. The combined weight of the entire span totaled 18,000 tonnes. As the two sections of the span neared the joint, the construction team had to carefully maneuver the 4.5 thousand ton structure into place.

The bridge stands out from other similar structures due to its unique lighting design. Instead of traditional halogen lights, a cutting-edge lighting system was introduced on the bridge, consisting of approximately 260 LED lamps produced by the company GreenEC, resulting in a combination of enhanced safety measures and aesthetic appeal.

- Length of the bridge - 4,364 meters
- Number of lanes - 4
- Transport levels - 1
- Maximum speed - 90 kilometers per hour

== See also ==
- List of longest bridges
- List of longest bridges in Russia (Список самых длинных мостов России)
