= Russian American Medical Association =

US health care professional association

The Russian American Medical Association (RAMA) is a non-profit organization of Russian American physicians founded in 2002 with a mission to facilitate and enable Russian American physicians and health care professionals to excel in patient care, teaching and research, and to pursue their aspirations in professional, humanitarian and community affairs. RAMA is partnering with a number of professional organizations, including such key collaborators as Russian American Dental Association, Russian American Scientists Association (RASA) and American Business Association of Russian Professionals (AmBAR). This and other partnerships foster collaboration among doctors, scientists, entrepreneurs, and medical researchers of European, American and Asian descent in the areas of medical education, biomedical and clinical research, as well as innovation and improvement of health care.

RAMA is not a political organization but does participate in legislative and political processes. RAMA works through regional representatives and chapters, which aim to be independent in their activity and decision-making. Each chapter's President or representative becomes a member of the Board of Directors and helps coordinate the association's work. It holds regular annual meetings, often in conjunction with other groups, such as Russian-American Dental Association (RADA) and publishes a journal.

RAMA is the largest association of Russian professionals outside of Russia, irrespective of the specialty. There are 66 full members from 40 states of the United States, and Canada, Russia, other CIS countries, England, Germany, Israel, Estonia and South Africa. The database of the Association includes more than 800 Russian-speaking physicians and other medical professionals.

RAMA was founded in 2002 by Dr. Boris Vinogradsky (now from Cleveland, Ohio, USA) as a coalition of several independent groups of doctors and now has organized chapters in Massachusetts, Ohio, Indiana, Minnesota, Maryland, Virginia and the District of Columbia, the Student Chapter and the Canada Group. It is working with groups of physicians in New York, Chicago, St. Louis, St. Paul, San Francisco and Los Angeles to form new chapters.

Following the break-up of the Soviet Union, hundreds of thousands of Russian physicians, biomedical scientists, engineers, and entrepreneurs have succeeded in building their professional careers, their personal lives and lives of their families around the world. A palpable part of this community is interested in helping the Russian people to improve health and life expectancy by building modern healthcare, institutions of biomedical research and entrepreneurship, and by joining international biomedical community via numerous professional organizations and institutions. The Russian American Medical Association plans to establish RAMA Institute of Medicine, which aims to further integrate Russian American medical specialists and biomedical scientists and researchers into the global biomedical community.

== RAMA programs ==
Medical Missions: RAMA has embarked on a mission to help children and adults in Russia who cannot afford healthcare and to enhance the professional education of doctors in Russia and other countries of the former USSR. RAMA has already carried out a series of successful medical missions in Russia and produced some telling results. Death rates at the clinics where RAMA mission groups worked have drastically decreased and professional level of the local doctors RAMA worked with has dramatically improved. RAMA continues its work in Siberia. Kemerovo is the city where RAMA cooperates closely with the International Children's Heart Foundation (ICHF) and saves lives of children with heart pathology. Rama has established its presence in the center of the Russian mining region, Leninsk-Kuznetsky, where it conducts multi-specialty medical mission to support local doctors in such areas as cardiovascular surgery and neurosurgery, gynecology and orthopedics.

Cooperation with Tomsk Regional Perinatal Center is another progressive development of RAMA medical missions in the region among other directions focusing on improving techniques of sustaining life of newborns with low and extremely low birth weight, surgery of newborns; retinopathy of prematurity and high-risk obstetrics.

RAMA work in central Russia has developed close ties with a Yaroslavl Regional Clinic focusing on cardiovascular surgery. Other RAMA medical mission plans include work in Russia, Kazakhstan, Moldova, Mari El Republic (Russia), and other.

Partner Program
The goal of the program is to coordinate efforts of multiple medical and non-medical groups that work with Russia.

RAMA Research Collaboration Project.

Observership Program
The purpose of this program is to let Russian-speaking medical graduates and international medical graduates to get clinical experience in an American hospital while preparing for their residency or improving their professional qualification. RAMA is collaborating with a number of clinics in the US, including those located in Cleveland, Ohio where RAMA's headquarters is. They are Cleveland Clinic, University Hospitals, Lake Health System, and Metrohealth Medical System.

Heart Health Awareness in Russians Project
This pilot program is being developed and will provide health information and medical education to the Russian immigrant population. The Phase I of the project will focus on the issues of the heart disease.

RAMA Discussion Forum
This is the largest Russian medical discussion group in America. Most questions of the certification process, residency and private practice issues, as well as the areas of all levels of the American health care system are discussed in detail there.

Russian-speaking Physicians Database
RAMA maintains the database of the Russian-speaking physicians in North America that is used for referrals and benefits both — physicians and patients across the country

RAMA Journal, National Conference Proceedings and RAMA Report
RAMA publications include information about RAMA as well as scientific articles of RAMA members and updates RAMA members and followers on the association latest activity.

Other programs
(at different stages of development) Credentials Verification Service, Job Search Assistance Program, Translators Bureau, Speakers Bureau, Advertising Service
