= Ambre =

Ambre may refer to:

== People ==
- Ambre Allinckx (born 2002), Swiss squash player
- Ambre Ballenghien (born 2000), Belgian field hockey player
- Ambre Hammond (born 1977), Australian classical pianist
- Ambre McLean, Canadian singer-songwriter
- Émilie Ambre (1849–1898), French opera singer
- Samuel Ambre (born 1972), Ghanaian politician
- Ambré, American singer and songwriter India Ambré Perkins (born 1996)

== Other uses ==
- Ambre or Arrufiac, French wine grape variety
- Ambre Energy Energy Limited, Australian coal and oil shale company
