= Nagothane =

- town
- Location in Maharashtra, India
- Coordinates: 18.53°N 73.13°E
- Country: India
- State: Maharashtra
- District: Raigad; Taluka Roha

Government
  - Body: Gram panchayat
- Elevation: 12 m (39 ft)

Population (2011)
  - Total: 12,549

Languages
  - Official: Marathi
- Time zone: UTC+5:30 (IST)
- PIN: 402106
- Telephone code: 02194

Nagothane is a census town in Roha Taluka, in the Raigad district of the Indian state of Maharashtra. The Kanyakumari-Panvel National Highway, famously known as Mumbai-Goa Highway (NH66) goes through this town.

== Geography ==
Nagothana is located at 18.53°N 73.13°E. It has an average elevation of 12 metres (39 feet).

This village is prettily situated in a hollow surrounded by wooded hills, on the right bank of the Amba river or Nagothana creek about twenty-four miles from its mouth. Between Nagothana and the mouth of the Amba, the creek varies from an eighth to three quarters of a mile in breadth. Above Dharamtar the bed is blocked with sand banks, and, within four miles of Nagothana, it is crossed by reefs of rock which can be passed only at full tide. The creek is so filled up with sand that it is not navigable even for country craft. Steamers cross daily from Mumbai to Dharamtar. From Dharamtar a steam launch plied to Nagothana till 1914-15, but it was discontinued with the growth in automobiles. The vessels chiefly employed on the creek are phatemaris and macvas, with an occasional bandar-boat used by travellers between Mumbai and Mahabaleshwar. Phatemaris are mostly used for carrying rice and salt; and macvas for rice and firewood. In the fair season, there is a considerable traffic at Nagothana, chiefly the export of rice and the import of salt and fish. Here it's usually hot and humid in the summers and it experiences very heavy rainfall with thunderstorms during the monsoon season amounting up to 90 inches of rainfall per year. Besides it is an industrial area with companies of petrochemical, steel industries amounting employment opportunities to a great extent. It is situated about 100 km away from Mumbai and is on the Mumbai-Goa national highway 17. To the east of this town are the parts of Sahyadris which add to the beauty of the town.

== History ==
In the beginning of the sixteenth century Nagothana belonged to Gujarat [De Barros, VII. 217, in Nairne's Konkan, 41.]. In 1529 Hector de Sylveira of Bassein went up the river Nagothana, and burnt six towns belonging to the king of Cambay. The Commander of Nagothana took the field against him with five hundred horse and a large force of infantry, and endeavoured to cut off his retreat [Faria in Kerr, VI. 210.]. In 1540 Dom Joao De Castro mentions the Nagothana river as running into the south of Bombay harbour [Dom Joao De Castro, Prim. Rot. 63.]. On the defeat of the prince of Gujarat by the Portuguese, the neighbourhood of Nagothana seems to have passed from Gujarat to Ahmadnagar, the allies of the Portuguese, with whom it remained till in 1636. The Moghals handed the Ahmadnagar Konkan to Bijapur. About ten years later is passed to Shivaji. It was the also one of the center to produce currency which was used in the era of Shivaji. In 1670 Nagothana is mentioned by Ogilby as a town and landing-place at the extreme south of Gujarat [Atlas, V. 243–244, Ogilby compiled from earlier writers.], and in 1675 it appears in Fryer as Magatan [New Account, 50, 61, 77.]. It is called Negotan [Aitchison's Treaties, V. 15.] in a treaty between the English and the Pesva in 1739, and is probably the Nagina of Tiffenthaler with 249 villages and a revenue of Rs. 17,726 a year [Des. Hist. Et. Gog. I. 505.]. In 1818 it is described as less prosperous than Pen, because the river was longer and shallower and there were no salt-works [Revenue Diary 142, p. 2370.].

== Places of interest ==
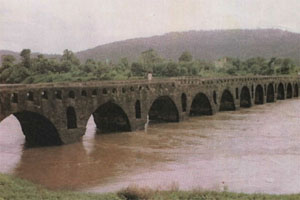
Nagothana Bridge

The chief object of interest is the old Musalman bridge about half a mile south-west of Nagothana. It is 480 feet long, nineteen feet high, and nine feet nine inches broad between the parapets, this narrowness being the chief peculiarity. The span of the main arch is twenty-two feet nine inches [East India Papers, III. 786.]. It is said to have been built about 1580 by Kaji Ala-ud-din of Ceul at a cost of Rs. 3,00,000. As this date falls between the siege of Ceul, during the alliance of the Musalman kings against the Portuguese, and the activity of the Nizamsahi troops twenty years later, it is probable that the bridge was built to facilitate the march of troops from Ahmadnagar, probably by the Koarl pass. In 1826 repairs costing Rs. 2,590 were sanctioned [East India Papers, III 786; Nairne's Konkan, 38.]. The bridge is at present in good condition and is much used by foot travellers, bullock carts and occasionally automobiles, the approaches not admitting of the passage of two carts. Till the mid 90s it was also used by heavy vehicles but was stopped, probably due to the age of the bridge. The masonry work is repaired from time to time.

The town comes under the electrification scheme under which the electricity generated at the Tata Power House at Bhira will be used to electrify the southern part of the district. Nagothana has a Zilla Parishad dispensary, three primary schools, two dharmasalas, a State Transport Stand, a post and telegraph office and a panchayat office.

must see in Nagothane

- Jogeshwari and Bhairavnath Temple
- Dagadi School (A jail built by British)
- Lakes (Total 5 Lakes)
- Gharli Temple (Main Place of Jogeshwari Devi)
- Rameshwar Temple
- Shiva Temple
- Bridge Between Nagothane and Warvatne (The bridge was built by king Ramraya of Vijayanagara)

Activities one can do from here:

- Trekking
- Rappelling and Rock Climbing
- White Water Rafting
- Bird Watching
- Nature Trails
- Fishing

Places of Tourist Interest near Nagothane:

- The Birla Temple
- Nandgaon and Kashid Beaches
- Alibaug Beaches of Kihim and Mandwa
- Usarvardhane or Vardayini Waterfalls
- Bhira Dam
- Murud Janjira Fort
- Pali Ganesh Mandir
- Amba River

Leisure Stay and Adventure Activities provided by adventure resorts at Nagothana.

== Demographics ==
Nagothane is a Census Town city in district of Raigarh, Maharashtra. The Nagothane Census Town has population of 12,549 of which 6,520 are males while 6,029 are females as per report released by Census India 2011.

The population of children aged 0-6 is 1598 which is 12.73% of total population of Nagothane (CT). In Nagothane Census Town, the female sex ratio is 925 against state average of 929. Moreover, the child sex ratio in Nagothane is around 1015 compared to Maharashtra state average of 894. The literacy rate of Nagothane city is 87.70% higher than the state average of 82.34%. In Nagothane, male literacy is around 91.13% while the female literacy rate is 83.94%.

Nagothane Census Town has total administration over 2,873 houses to which it supplies basic amenities like water and sewerage. It is also authorized to build roads within Census Town limits and impose taxes on properties coming under its jurisdiction.

Though rice/paddy is the major crop which is cultivated here, since the 1980s Nagothana got recognition for its special type of beans called 'Kadve Vaal'. Historically it was also recognised for sesame and teak wood.

In the late 1980s a decision was made by the Government to install India's first Gas Cracker Complex at Nagothana. It was called as Indian Petrochemicals Corporation Limited, Maharashtra Gas Cracker Complex. Raw material for the Petrochemical plant was transported through pipelines from Bombay High (Oil & Natural Gas Corporation). This facility is called as RIL-Nagothane Manufacturing Division after IPCL was acquired by Reliance Industries Limited in 2002.
