= Ambadagatti =

- Village
- Location in Karnataka, India Ambadagatti (India)
- Coordinates: 15°38′13.5″N 74°44′9.1″E
- Country: India
- State: Karnataka
- District: Belgaum

Languages
  - Official: Kannada
- Time zone: UTC+5:30 (IST)

Ambadagatti is a village in Belgaum district in the southern state of Karnataka, India.
