= Amur Bay =

Bay in Peter the Great Gulf, Sea of Japan, Russia

Coordinates: 43°06′00″N 131°44′00″E

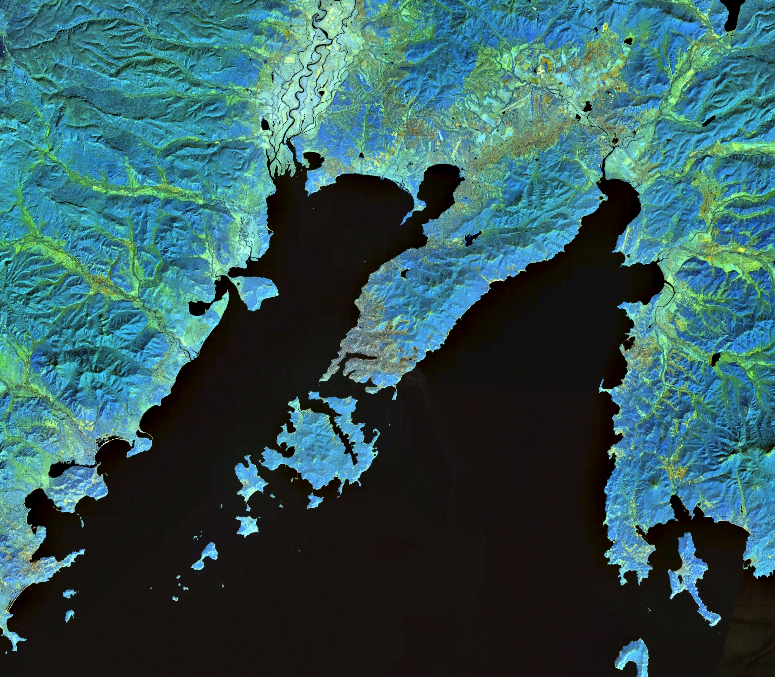
The Peter the Great Gulf: Amur Bay (west), Muravyov-Amursky Peninsula and Ussuri Bay (east).

Amur Bay (Russian: Амурский Залив, Amurskiy Zaliv), a major bay within Peter the Great Gulf of the Sea of Japan, has an approximate length of 65 kilometres (40 miles), a width of 10 kilometres (6.2 miles) to 20 kilometres (12 miles), and a depth of 20 metres (66 feet). It is part of a larger bay formed with Ussuri Bay, to which it is connected by the Eastern Bosphorus, and from which it is separated by the Muravyov-Amursky Peninsula and by the Eugénie Archipelago. The Amba River, Razdolnaya River, Narva River, and Barabashevka River all flow into Amur Bay.

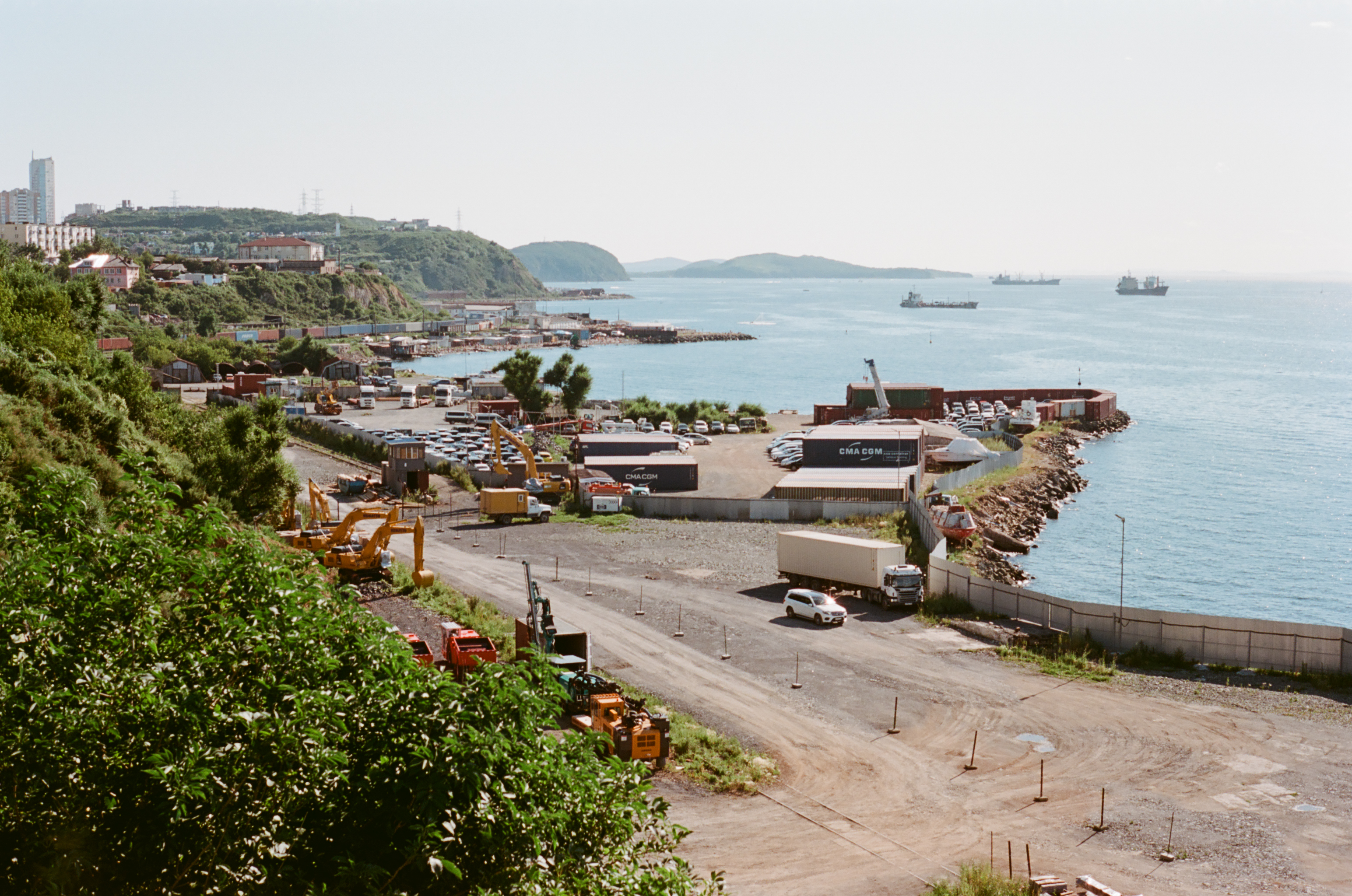
Amur Bay shore seen from Vladivostok

Administratively, Amur Bay is entirely within Primorsky Krai, Russia. Vladivostok, the largest city in the Russian Far East and the capital of Primorsky Krai, is situated along the eastern coast of the bay on the Muravyov-Amursky Peninsula and the Eugénie Archipelago. Part of the bay is crossed by the Amur Bay Bridge of the A-370 highway, which connects the De-Friz Peninsula with the Sovetsky District of Vladivostok. Amur Bay is a popular tourism and recreation area in Primorsky Krai, with many sanatoriums, beach resorts and children's summer camps.

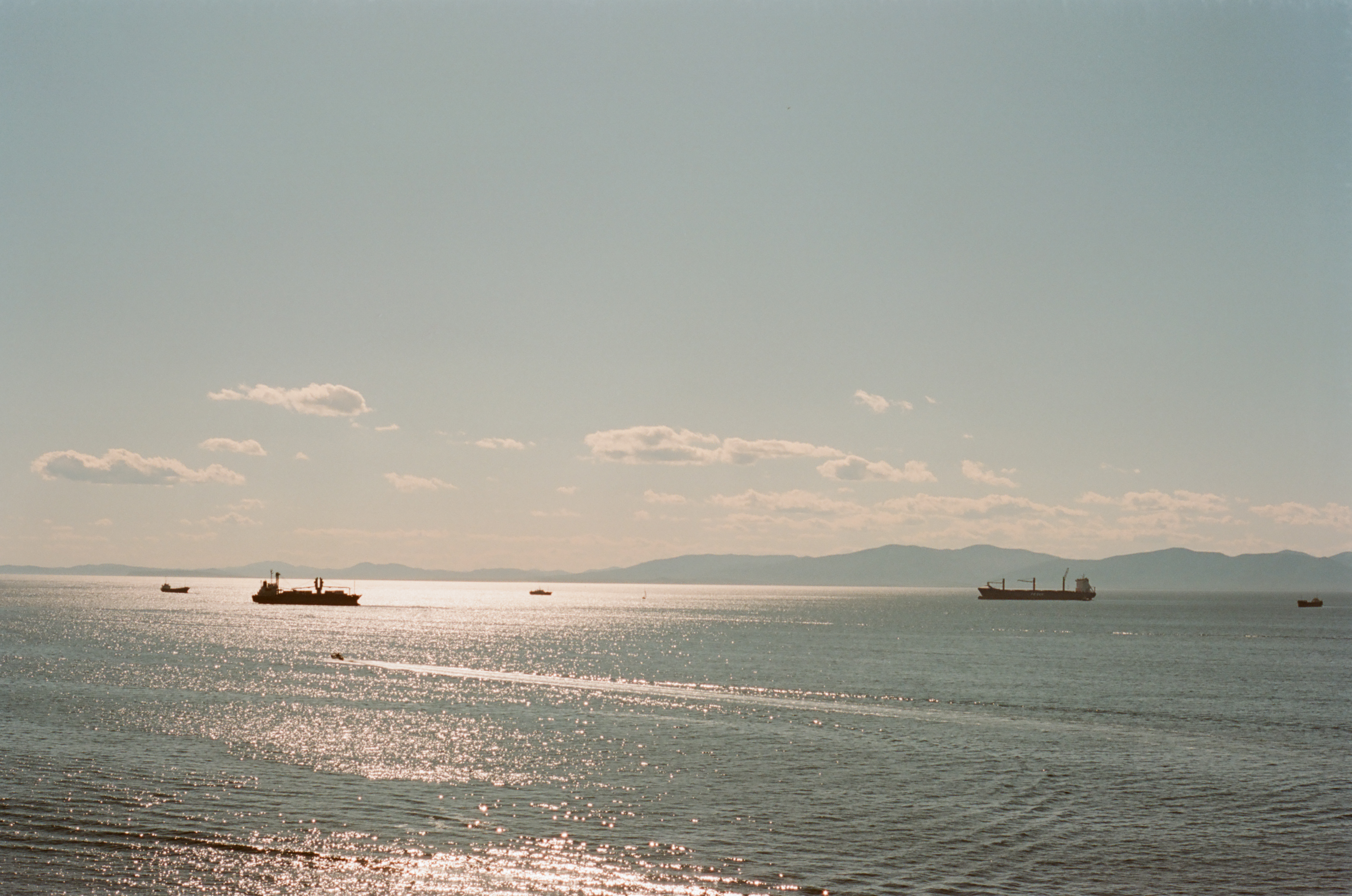
Amur Bay
