= Operation Amba =

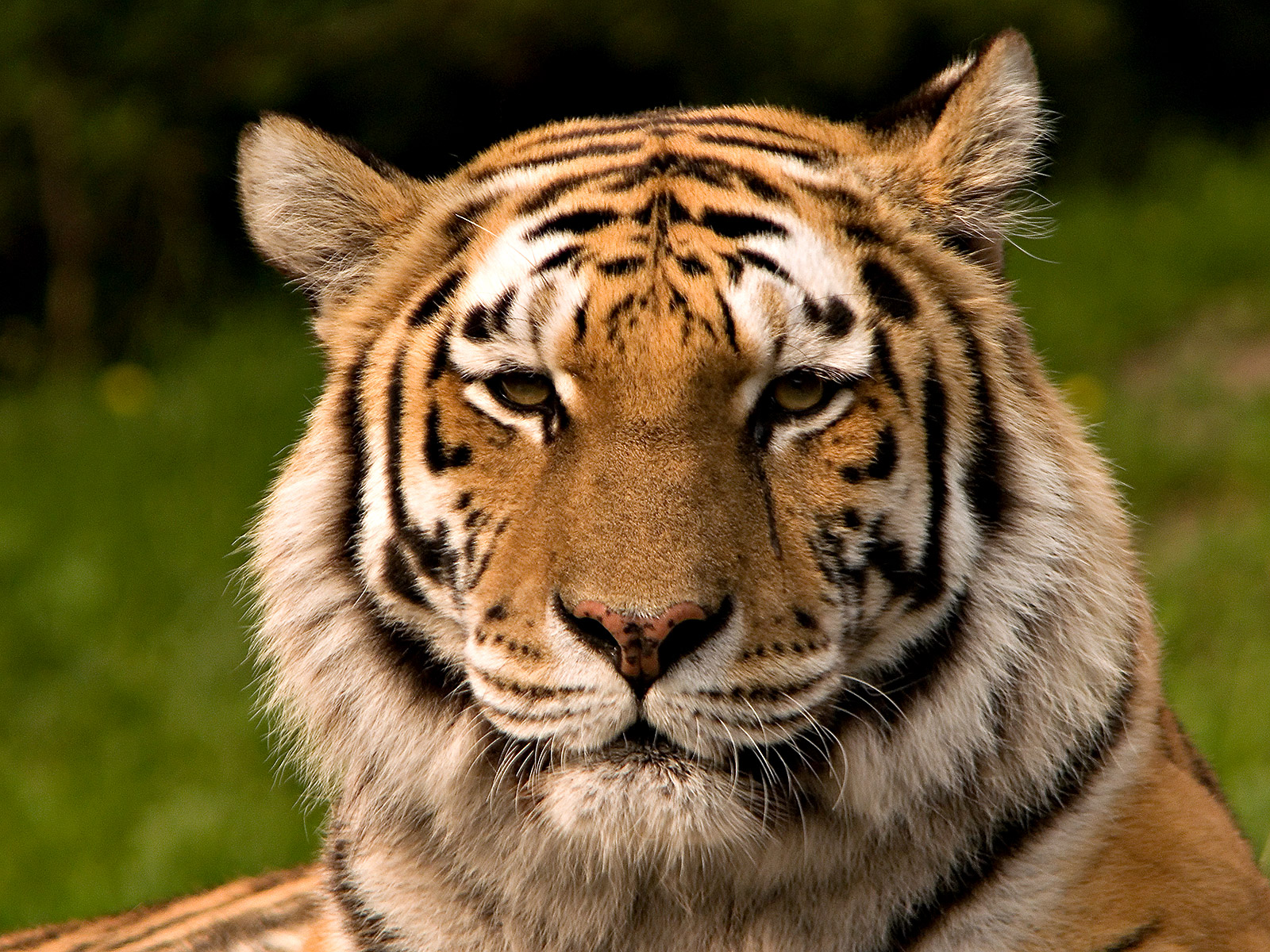
Siberian tiger

Operation Amba is the codename of a Russian programme to curtail the poaching of Siberian tigers in the Russian Far East. It was described as a strategic defence of the tiger which uses psychological operations as a major element. The programme was concentrated on identifying and neutralizing tiger traders in the Russian Far East and used small anti-poaching teams to roam the taiga and build a network among local population for support and information. Support from the local population and state law enforcement agencies was a key element of the programme. The name "Operation Amba" is derived from "Amba", the name for tiger used by the Udegai people of the Russian Far East.

Operation Amba has been widely successful, having saved cub tigers, made seizures of illegal poaching materials, and raided illegal operations and poaching rings.

Operation Amba is credited for bringing the Siberian tiger back from the brink of extinction in the mid-1990s and helping stabilize the population after years of heavy poaching. Prior to Operation Amba, an estimated 60 to 70 tigers were killed each year by commercial poachers who sold the body parts (skins, bones, etc.) to black market traders. By 1995, the population was thought to have dramatically decreased to just 250-300. By 2001 however, poaching was down to about 8 to 10 tigers per year, and the population had grown to about 400-450 tigers. According to the World Wide Fund for Nature, the latest Russian Census reports put the current number to be anywhere between 480 and 520 without including the small numbers of this subspecies present in mainland China.

== See also ==
- Siberian tiger
- Poaching
- Endangered species
