= Ambar – Ideas on Paper =

Ambar – Ideas on Paper S.A., known in Portugal simply as Ambar, is a Portuguese company founded in 1939, and headquartered in Porto. Its name is derived from the first two syllables of its founder’s name, Américo Barbosa. Ambar produces and commercialises stationery products to be used at home or in the office and also school stationery. It has a subsidiary in Spain and exports its products to over 30 countries.

== History ==
Ambar was founded in 1939 by Américo Barbosa, with bookbinding as its main activity. Its name derives from the first two syllables of the name of the founder.

In 1960, the company increased its national presence with the opening of the Lisbon Delegation and in the early 1970s, with modern facilities and a computerised structure, it had more than 1000 employees.

In 1976, a fire totally destroyed the premises on Rua Manuel Pinto de Azevedo (Porto), sparing neither machinery nor raw materials. At the same time, Américo Barbosa was injured in an accident and underwent lengthy hospitalisation. It was from his hospital bed that the company was rebuilt and reorganised.

In 1987, in the course of its international expansion, Ambar España, a branch in Madrid, was created, strengthening its position in the Iberian market.

In 1996, Américo Barbosa died, and his daughter, Isabel Barbosa, became Chairman of the Board of Directors. Her main mission was to continue the work of her father, introducing into his project a priority objective of growth and dissemination of the Ambar brand throughout the world, promoting innovation and greater emotional involvement in all products.

In 2004, Ambar changed its name to AMBAR – IDEAS NO PAPEL, SA, a move to accompany a well-defined change in its strategy, based on three key aspects: creativity, focus on the consumer, internationalisation.

== Products ==
Ambar’s products include office material (Lever arch files, notebooks, files..) back to school (backpacks, pencil cases, ringbinders…) and products for home (Photo Albums, organisers, wrapping systems…)
