= Ussuri Bay =

Bay of Peter the Great Gulf, Russia

Coordinates: 43°08′42″N 132°03′23″E

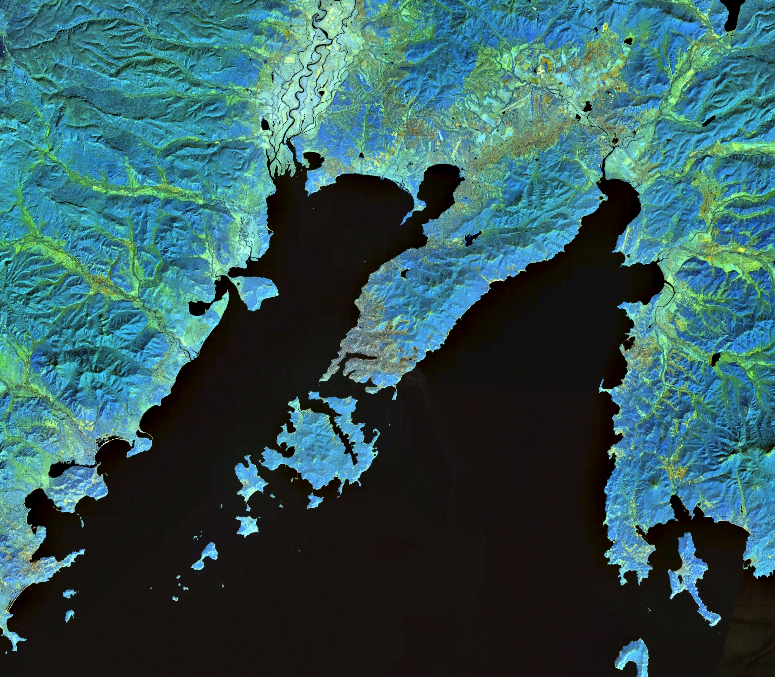
The Peter the Great Gulf: Amur Bay (west), Muravyov-Amursky Peninsula and Ussuri Bay (east).

Ussuri Bay (Russian: Уссурийский залив) is a major bay within the Peter the Great Gulf of the Sea of Japan.

It is the largest bay in Peter the Great Gulf with a length of approximately 67 kilometres (42 miles), a width of between 10 kilometres (6.2 miles) to 55 kilometres (34 miles), and an average depth of 40 metres (130 feet) and a maximum of 69 metres (226 feet). Ussuri Bay forms part of a much larger bay with Amur Bay, to which it is connected by the Eastern Bosphorus, and separated by the Muravyov-Amursky Peninsula and Eugénie Archipelago. The bay was named after the Ussuri River, a tributary of the Amur River that forms part of the Russia's border with the People's Republic of China.

Ussuri Bay is entirely within Primorsky Krai, Russia, and parts of Vladivostok, the largest city in the Russian Far East and the capital of Primorsky Krai, and the towns of Bolshoy Kamen and Shkotovo are situated along the coast of the bay. The bay is a popular recreation area in the region due to its sand beaches, the best known being Lazurnaya Bay. One recent feature that has been attracting tourists stems from sea glass, where the tidal action has pounded glass bottles that had washed up to the shore or been dumped there by nearby glass and porcelain factories into rounded glass pebbles. Rather than an environmental danger, the glass on the beach is reported to be safe, according to the Siberian Times newspaper.
