= Abhor and Mehraela =

Martyrs and Saints

Saints Abhor and Mehraela

Martyrs
- Venerated in: Coptic Orthodox Church Roman Catholic Church
- Feast: January 9

Abhor (or Amba Hor) and Mehraela were a brother and sister who were martyrs for the Christian faith. Etymology of the word "Abhor": from Latin abhorrēre (to shudder at, shrink from), from "ab" (away) and "horrēre" (to bristle, shudder). The book of their "acts" has been lost. Their feast day is celebrated on January 9 in the Coptic Church.

== Sources ==
- Cornwallis Harris, William (1844). The Highlands of Aethiopia: In Three Volumes, Vol 3. London: Longman, Brown, Green, and Longmans, Peternoster-Row. p. 416.
- Holweck, F. G., A Biographical Dictionary of the Saints. St. Louis, Missouri, US: B. Herder Book Co. 1924.
