= Amba Bongo =

French writer

- Born: April 21, 1962 (age 64); Kinshasa, DRC
- Education: l'Institut Supérieur Pédagogique (English and African Culture), University of Warocqué (Psychology)
- Occupation: Author
- Writing career
- Language: French
- Years active: 2000–present
- Period: 2000–present
- Notable work: Une femme en exil

Amba Bongo (born April 21, 1962) is a writer and advocate for refugees from the Democratic Republic of the Congo-Kinshasa where she studied English and African Culture at Gombe's l'Institut Supérieur Pédagogique. She also studied Psychology at the University of Warocqué in Mons, Belgium.

== Biography ==
Since 1994, she has worked within the British legal system, working as project director to Active Women, a refugee community organisation supporting vulnerable French speaking African women refugees and asylum seekers seeking to settle in the United Kingdom.

Amba writes novels, poems and short stories and she currently lives in London.

Her first novel Une femme en exil (ISBN 2-7384-9705-5) was published in 2000 by L’Harmattan, Paris. The story is about Anna, who finds a job as an academic adviser at the University of Kinshasa, but she is taken away by members of the state security service under who she endures suffering, humiliation and torture before she is ultimately exiled in London.
