= Orchestra of the City =

The Orchestra of the City is an orchestra based in London, England.

Founded in April 2003, the Orchestra of the City consists of amateur but well-trained musicians, and plays to a high standard. It is a subscription orchestra and is run by a committee. The current musical director is Chris Hopkins, who took over the role from Ben Bayl in 2009.

The orchestra performs large works with recent notable performances including the Premiere of Christopher Gunning's Guitar Concerto with Craig Ogden, Shostakovich's Cello Concerto No. 1 with Guy Johnston, Bartok Violin Concerto No. 2 with Andrew Harvey and Brahms Double Concerto with Andrew Harvey and Colin Alexander. The orchestra has also been used as a rehearsal orchestra for the likes of Hideko Udagawa and Nicola Benedetti.

Orchestra of the City celebrated its 10th anniversary in July 2013 with a performance of Bernstein's Overture to Candide, Chausson's Poème Op. 25 (with Anna Ovsyanikova) and Rachmaninoff's 3rd Symphony.
