= Amber: Journeys Beyond =

1996 video game

- Developer: Hue Forest Entertainment
- Publishers: Hue Forest Entertainment (1996) (mail order); Cendant Software (199?); Changeling Software (199?); Graphic Simulations Corporation (199?)
- Designers: Frank Wimmer, Susan Wimmer
- Engine: Macromedia Director
- Platforms: Mac OS System 7, Windows 95
- Release: 1996
- Genre: Adventure
- Mode: Single player

Amber: Journeys Beyond is an American computer game released in 1996 for Apple Macintosh computers and Windows 95. It is the only game produced by Hue Forest Entertainment, founded by Frank and Susan Wimmer.

== Gameplay ==
Amber: Journeys Beyond is a first-person point-and-click adventure game similar to Myst. Gameplay is nonlinear and events in the game occur at random depending on the player's progress.

== Plot ==
Paranormal researcher Dr. Roxanne "Roxy" Westbridge (Sandi Fix) purchases a house in North Carolina believed to be inhabited by ghosts. The player character, a friend of Roxy's, is asked by a mutual contact to check on Roxy due to concerns towards her ghost hunting equipment not being properly developed. As the player character drives to the house, a ghostly apparition in the road causes them to crash into a nearby pond.

Emerging from the water, the player character explores the property and discovers Roxy unconscious in the garage with a device on her head. The player character also finds Roxy's equipment, including the unfinished Astral Mobility By Electromagnetic Resonance (AMBER) headset, which allows the user to enter the minds of ghosts. Exploring the house further, the player discovers Roxy's spirit has become trapped between realms while she was using AMBER.

The player character eventually learns the house is inhabited by three ghosts unaware of what happened to them: Margaret (Emily Andress/Susan Wimmer), (Note: Margaret is physically portrayed by Emily Andress and voiced by Susan Wimmer) a woman who committed suicide after learning her husband Richard (Brendan Underhill) died in World War II; Brice (Michael Brocki), a gardener who killed his employers and their daughter Mandy (Tommi Swinson) under the delusion that they were going to be abducted by aliens before hanging himself; and Edwin (Matt Andress/Lauren Andress), (Note: Edwin is physically portrayed by Matt Andress and voiced by Lauren Andress) a young boy who drowned in the frozen pond while playing with his talking doll Chippy (voiced by Greg Purdy) and teddy bear. Using AMBER, the player character helps each ghost remember their death, allowing them to pass on. Once the ghosts have left, AMBER gains enough energy to bring Roxy's spirit back to the natural realm.

While attempting to restore electricity to the home, the player character is electrocuted and dies, but is brought back to life by an astral figure, who tells them to save Roxy. The player character accesses Roxy's computer, which they use to recalibrate AMBER to return Roxy's spirit. Following the computer's instructions, the player character places AMBER on Roxy, causing an explosion in the garage. Roxy emerges unscathed, remarking AMBER needs more work, and asks the player character where they parked their car.

== Reception ==
Reception

Review scores
Publication	Score
Computer Gaming World	4/5 (WIN)
GameSpot	7.4/10 (WIN)
Next Generation	3/5 (WIN)
PC Gamer (US)	53%
Computer Games Strategy Plus	4.5/5 (MAC)
Macworld	4/5
MacHome Journal	4/5
MacAddict	"Spiffy"
PC Games	B−

Awards
Publication	Award
Macworld	"Best Adventure Game" 1996
Codie awards	"Best Debut of the Year" (finalist)

At the time of release, the game received moderate to favorable reviews from critics. Most commented that while Amber fell in with the pile of Myst clones coming out at the time, its eerie storyline and presentation to an extent offset its limited gameplay and animation and made it stand out from the rest of the pack. A Next Generation critic was bothered more than most by the similarities to Myst, but concluded that "If you overlook the lack of originality in the game's mechanics, you might just enjoy the ride for what it's worth - a scary story told with nice graphics and some boggling puzzles." Particular subjects of praise included the haunting textured environments and ambient soundtrack.

However, Robert Coffey of Computer Gaming World and Rebecca Anderson of GameSpot both also criticized that the game is too short and the final puzzle is anticlimactic, though Anderson remarked that most of the puzzles are genuinely challenging and well-integrated with the story. PC Games's Shane Mooney summarized, "None too original, but it could have been worse. Journeys Beyond is a little better than most Myst-like adventure games." Newsweek gave a positive review in their November 1996 issue. while Chuck Klimushyn of Computer Games Strategy Plus called Amber "an unassuming masterpiece".

The editors of Macworld gave Amber their 1996 "Best Adventure Game" award. Steven Levy of the magazine wrote, "Strip Myst of its fantasy-genre trappings and replace them with a dollop of Stephen King, and you can begin to understand what it feels like to play Amber: Journeys Beyond—a gorgeous, absorbing supernatural adventure." He concluded, "At its best, Amber fulfills some of the almost-never-realized ambitions of interactive fiction."

In 2011, Adventure Gamers named Amber the 70th-best adventure game ever released.

=== Awards ===
- Software Publishers Association: Excellence In Software Codie award Finalist—Best Debut of the Year
- Macworld, January 1997: Game Hall of Fame—Best Adventure Game of the Year
- HIDE (Human Interface Design Excellence) Award Finalist—Third Place, for Most Elegant Interface
- Computer Games Strategy Plus February 1997: Stamp of Approval
- MACup Magazine, February 1997: Game of the Month

=== Sales ===
The Macintosh version of Amber: Journeys Beyond had disappointing sales. Jeanine DeSocio, president of publisher Changeling, attributed this to retailer reluctance to stock any Macintosh games that are not ports of high-profile PC games.
