= Ambás =

Ambás may refer to:

- Ambás (Carreño), a civil parish in Spain
- Ambás (Grado), a civil parish in Spain
- Ambás (Villaviciosa), a civil parish in Spain
