= List of storms named Amber =

The name Amber has been used for two tropical cyclones worldwide: one in the West Pacific Ocean and one in the Australian region.

In the West Pacific:

- Typhoon Amber (1997) (T9716, 18W, Miling) – a Category 3 typhoon that hit Taiwan and then mainland China

In the Australian region:

- Cyclone Amber (1968) – formed to the west of the Cocos (Keeling) Islands and did not approach land
