= Psote =

Bishop of Ebsay, Egypt (died 300)

Saint Psote
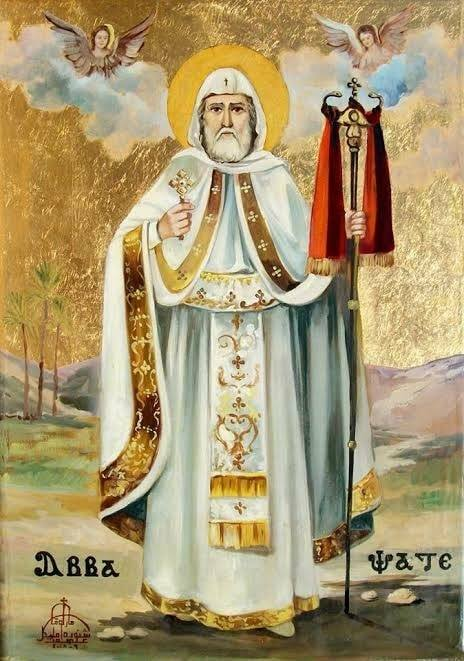
- Icon of St. Apa Psote

Martyr
- Born: Egypt
- Died: 300; Antinoe, Egypt
- Venerated in: Coptic Orthodox Church
- Major shrine: St Samuel the Confessor Coptic Orthodox Monastery

Psote (died 300), also known as Bisada, Besada, Psate/Psati, Abashadi, Abassadius, or Beshada, was a bishop of Ebsay in Upper Egypt. He was martyred by beheading at Antinoe. St. Apa Psote was a revered Coptic Orthodox bishop from the city of Psoi, known for his devout faith and martyrdom during the Diocletianic Persecution, a time of severe repression against Christians in the Roman Empire.

His feast day is observed on December 23 in the Coptic Church or on December 21 in some other churches.

== Life ==
Apa Psote, also known as Saint Psote, was a revered Christian bishop in the ancient city of Psoi, located in Upper Egypt. Born into a devout Christian family, Psote grew up with a strong foundation in the teachings of Christ. From a young age, he exhibited a deep spiritual awareness and a fervent dedication to God. His wisdom and understanding of the Scriptures quickly set him apart, leading to his eventual ordination as the bishop of Psoi.

As bishop, Psote was known for his eloquent preaching and his ability to inspire and strengthen the faith of those around him. He became a shepherd to his flock, providing guidance, comfort, and support to Christians during a time of intense persecution under the Roman Emperor Diocletian. This period, known as the Diocletianic Persecution, was one of the most severe and widespread persecutions of Christians in the Roman Empire.

Despite the dangers, Psote remained unwavering in his faith and commitment to his community. Alongside his fellow bishop, Callinico (Gallinikos), he traveled throughout the region, spreading the word of God, reinforcing Christian communities, and offering solace to those suffering under the oppressive regime. His influence extended far beyond the city of Psoi, as his reputation for piety and wisdom attracted followers from all over Upper Egypt.

== Persecution ==
The Roman governor, Arianus, informed Emperor Diocletian about the growing influence of Psote and Callinico, expressing concern that their teachings were leading many to abandon the Roman gods. In response, Diocletian issued an ultimatum: the bishops were to renounce their faith and offer sacrifices to the Roman gods or face execution.

On a Sunday, as Psote celebrated the Liturgy, Roman officials arrived with Diocletian's letter. Despite knowing the consequences, Psote refused to submit to the emperor's demands, declaring his unwavering commitment to Christ. He requested a brief reprieve to prepare himself and his followers for his impending martyrdom. Psote addressed his congregation, urging them to remain steadfast in their faith, even in his absence. The congregation, deeply moved, wept at the thought of losing their beloved shepherd.
