= Amber Room (disambiguation) =

The Amber Room was chamber decorated in amber panels in the Catherine Palace of Tsarskoye Selo near Saint Petersburg.

Amber Room may also refer to:

- The Amber Room, a 1992 novel by T. Davis Bunn
- The Amber Room, a 1995 novel by Christopher Matthew
- The Amber Room (novel), a 2003 novel by Steve Berry
- The Amber Room, a 2005 book by Cathy Scott-Clark and Adrian Levy
