= Ambar, Bismil =

Village in Diyarbakır Province, Turkey

Ambar
- Neighbourhood
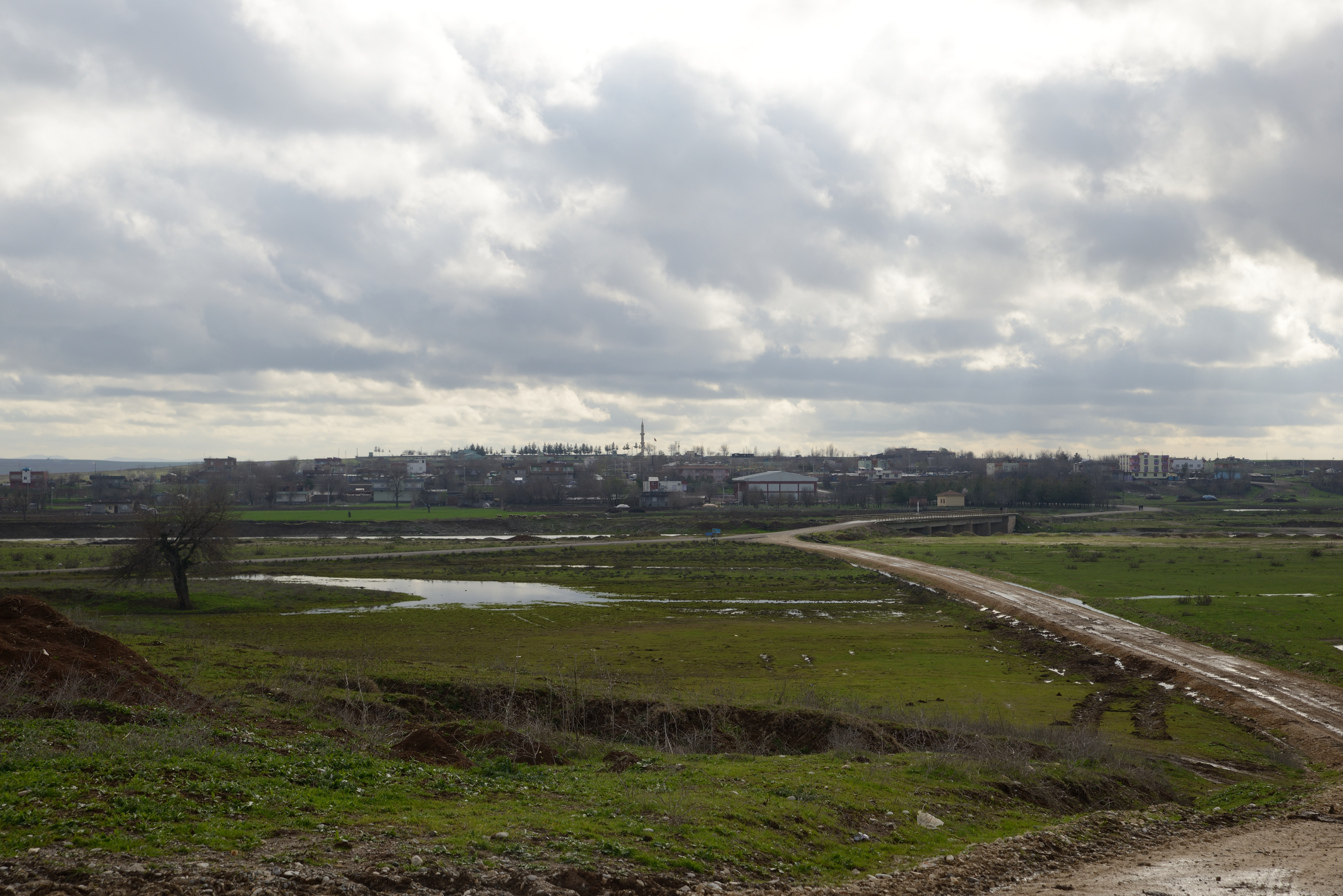

- Location within Turkey
- Coordinates: 37.852°N 40.527°E
- Country: Turkey
- Province: Diyarbakır
- District: Bismil
- Population (2022): 1,937
- Time zone: UTC+3 (TRT)

Ambar (Kurdish: Embar) is a neighbourhood of the municipality and district of Bismil, Diyarbakır Province, Turkey. Its population is 1,937 (2022). Before the 2013 reorganisation, it was a town (belde).

It is populated by Muhacir Bulgarians and Kurds.

== History ==
Bulgarian refugees were settled in the village by the authorities to Turkify the region, however the settlers would become integrated into the surrounding Kurdish culture.
