= AmBAR =

US Russian-speaking trade association

American Business Association of Russian
- Abbreviation: AmBAR
- Formation: 2002
- Founded at: Palo Alto, California
- Type: non profit
- Official language: Russian

The American Business Association of Russian-Speaking Professionals (AmBAR) is a non-profit organization founded to support the Russian-speaking professional community in the United States. The organization's headquarters are located in Palo Alto, California.

== History ==
The AmBAR was founded in 2002 by a group of experienced technology entrepreneurs and business professionals from Silicon Valley companies and venture capital firms such as Sun Microsystems, Intel Capital, and Draper Fisher Jurvetson.

== Membership ==
In November 2011, the AmBAR group on LinkedIn counted over 2000 members. People who associate themselves with AmBAR are entrepreneurs, engineers, marketers, lawyers, finance specialists, venture capitalists, angel investors, as well as representatives of many other fields.

AmBAR is the organizer of the Silicon Valley Open Doors (SVOD) technology investment conference, which takes place annually in Silicon Valley (California, United States). During the seven years of its existence, SVOD provided a boost in professional and business contacts to hundreds of startup ventures founded by Russian-speaking entrepreneurs and attracted prominent speakers from the Silicon Valley high-tech community.

== Programs ==
AmBAR runs a range of events and programs that facilitate interaction and communication among and between the US and Russian (or, more broadly, Russian-speaking) business and professional communities. These activities are often organized in partnership with well-known organizations. In October 2010, AmBAR partnered with the Center for Russian, East European, and Eurasian Studies of Stanford University (CREEES) to hold a panel discussion "What's the Secret of Silicon Valley and How Can It Be Replicated in Russia", whose guest speaker was Viktor Vekselberg, the President of the Skolkovo Foundation.

With the Russian Corporation of Nanotechnologies (Rusnano), AmBAR organized Silicon Valley's first venture capital trip to Russia.

"A Russian state-backed fund for investment in nanotechnology, Rusnano, organized the trip with AmBar, a trade group for Russian-speaking professionals in the San Francisco Bay Area. ... Rusnano's director, Anatoly Chubais, one of the architects of Russia's immediate post-Soviet privatization, who has now joined the effort to diversify, said in a statement that the goal of the visit was to "bring together the country's most promising innovative projects with the world's smartest money."

All events took place in Moscow on May 25–27, 2010. Most of the participating venture capital firms are ranked within the top 50 of all venture firms, with a total amount of capital under management exceeding $50 billion. On May 25, the delegates met with Russian President Dmitry Medvedev.

AmBAR organized a meeting between Russian president Dmitry Medvedev and his Russian compatriots working in the San Francisco Bay Area. The meeting took place in a cafe in Palo Alto during Medvedev's June 2010 visit to Silicon Valley. The exchange of opinions between AmBAR members and Medvedev went on for about two hours. The transcript of the meeting is available from the president's press service in both Russian and English. The discussion focused on the question "How could Russia reproduce the start-up and venture capital culture of Silicon Valley?"

In February 2022, after Vladimir Putin launched the war against Ukraine, AmBAR published an "Open Letter Against War", publicly expressing its strong condemnation of the invasion.
