= Amba River (India) =

River in Maharashtra, India

Coordinates: 18°38′43.13″N 73°3′37.09″E

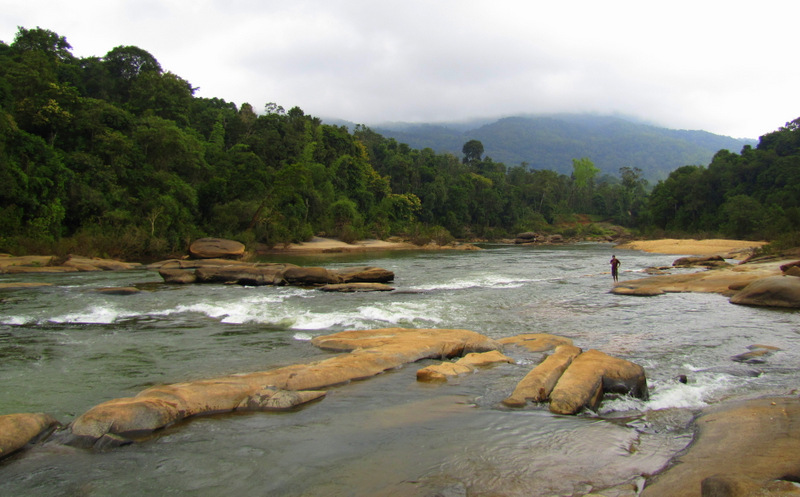
- Amba River in Raigad district

- Location within Maharashtra

Location
- Country: India
- State: Maharashtra, India

Physical characteristics
- Mouth

Amba River is a river in Raigad district, Maharashtra. The River comes from the Borghat mountain range in the Sahyadris at around 554 meters above sea level on the Khopoli-Khandala road. The river initially flows southward and then northwestward until it joins the Arabian Sea at Dharamtar Bay near the village of Rewas. The total length of the river before it joins the sea is about 76 kilometers.
