= Amba (river) =

- Location of mouth in Russia

Location
- Country: Russia

Physical characteristics
- Source
  - location: Borisov Plateau of Sikhote-Alin
  - elevation: 690 m (2,260 ft)
- Mouth: Sea of Japan
  - location: Amur Bay
  - coordinates: 43.2116°N 131.7357°E
- Length: 63 km (39 mi)
- Basin size: 330 km^{2} (130 mi^{2})

The Amba (Russian: Амба, in Udege Language it means Tiger) is a river in Primorsky Krai, Russia.

It rises in the Borisov Plateau near the border with China and flows into the Amur Bay of the Sea of Japan. The river is 63 kilometres (39 mi) long, and its drainage basin covers 330 square kilometres (130 mi^{2}). The river is 50 to 70 metres (160 to 230 ft) wide and 1.5 to 2 metres (5 to 7 ft) deep.

The water level of the Amba may rise as much as 2 metres (7 ft) higher after summer rains.

Amba literally means Amur tiger in Nanai and Udege languages.
