= List of rural localities in Primorsky Krai =

Map of Russia with Primorsky Krai highlighted

This is a list of rural localities in Primorsky Krai. Primorsky Krai (Russian: Примо́рский край, romanized: Primorsky kray, IPA: [prʲɪˈmorskʲɪj kraj]), informally known as Primorye (Примо́рье, IPA: [prʲɪˈmorʲjɪ]), is the Russian name for a province of Russia. Primorsky means "maritime" in Russian, so in English translation it is sometimes known as the Maritime Province or Maritime Territory. Its administrative center is in the city of Vladivostok. The region's population is 1,956,497 (2010 Census).

== Locations ==
- 53rd km
- Agzu
- Anuchino
- Barabash
- Baykal
- Bezverkhovo
- Chernigovka
- Chuguyevka
- Dersu
- Galyonki
- Gorny
- Kamen-Rybolov
- Khorol
- Mikhaylovka
- Narva
- Novaya Moskva
- Novonikolsk
- Novopokrovka
- Peretychikha
- Pokrovka
- Rudnaya Pristan
- Rudny
- Trudovoye
- Varfolomeyevka
- Vladimiro-Alexandrovskoye
- Volno-Nadezhdinskoye
- Vysokogorsk
- Yakovlevka

== See also ==
- Lists of rural localities in Russia
