= Rudny, Russia =

Rudny (Russian: Ру́дный; masculine), Rudnaya (Ру́дная; feminine), or Rudnoye (Ру́дное; neuter) is the name of several rural localities in Russia:

- Rudny, Republic of Bashkortostan, a village in Tugaysky Selsoviet of Blagoveshchensky District of the Republic of Bashkortostan
- Rudny, Belgorod Oblast, a settlement in Novooskolsky District of Belgorod Oblast
- Rudny, Primorsky Krai, a settlement in Kavalerovsky District of Primorsky Krai
- Rudny, Tula Oblast, a settlement in Kaznacheyevskaya Rural Administration of Shchyokinsky District of Tula Oblast
- Rudnoye, Jewish Autonomous Oblast, a selo in Obluchensky District of the Jewish Autonomous Oblast
- Rudnoye, Orenburg Oblast, a selo in Ivanovsky Selsoviet of Tyulgansky District of Orenburg Oblast
- Rudnoye, Sverdlovsk Oblast, a selo in Irbitsky District of Sverdlovsk Oblast

== See also ==
- Rudnaya Pristan, a selo under the administrative jurisdiction of the town of Dalnegorsk, Primorsky Krai
