= Gornorechensky =

Urban locality in Kavalerovsky District, Primorsky Krai, Russia

Coordinates: 44°15′45″N 135°06′45″E

Gornorechensky (Russian: Горноре́ченский, lit. mountain river) is an urban locality (an urban-type settlement) in Kavalerovsky District of Primorsky Krai, Russia, located 2 kilometers (1.2 mi) east of Kavalerovo, with which it is connected by an auto route. Population: 3,165 (2010 census); 3,492 (2002 census); 4,045 (1989 Soviet census).

== History ==
Founded as the settlement of Kentsukhe (Кенцухе) in 1945, it was renamed Gornorechensky on December 29, 1972. Urban-type settlement status was granted to it in 1979.
