= Vysokogorsk =

Rural locality in Kavalerovsky District, Primorsky Krai, Russia

Coordinates: 44°24′15″N 135°24′07″E

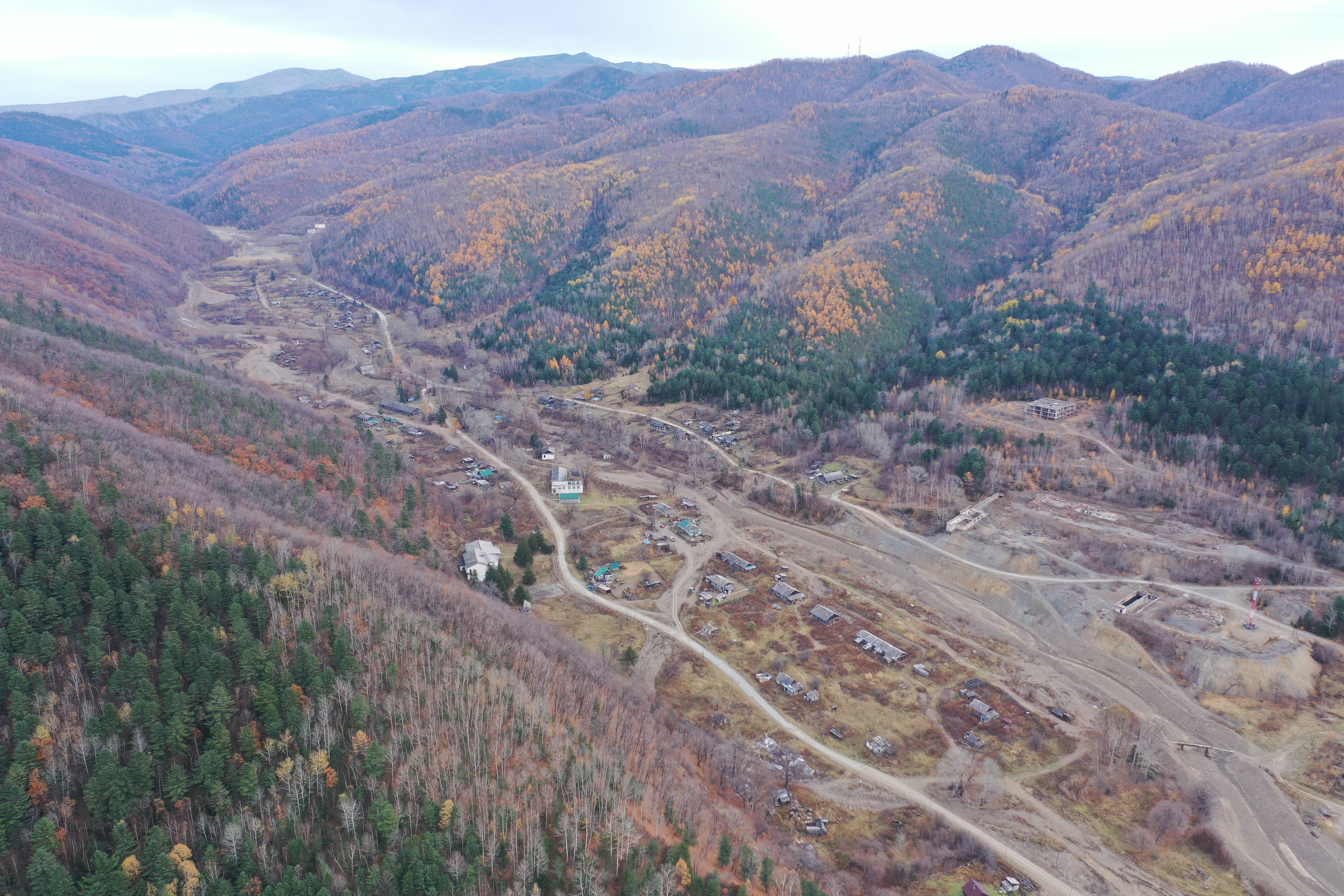

Vysokogorsk (Russian: Высокого́рск, lit. high mountain) is a rural locality (a selo) in Kavalerovsky District of Primorsky Krai, Russia, located in the Sikhote-Alin Mountains, 30 kilometers (19 mi) northeast of the district's administrative center of Kavalerovo. Population: 293 (2010 census); 474 (2002 census); 888 (1989 Soviet census).

== History ==
Vysokogorsk was granted urban-type settlement status in 1956 and demoted in status to that of a rural locality in December 2011.

== Economy ==
Tin mining is the main means of employment of the local population.

=== Transportation ===
The nearest railway station, Varfolomeyevka, is situated in 165 kilometers (103 mi). Vysokogorsk is connected with Kavalerovo and Dalnegorsk by an auto route.
