= Lecanora ussuriensis =

Scientific classification
- Kingdom: Fungi
- Division: Ascomycota
- Class: Lecanoromycetes
- Order: Lecanorales
- Family: Lecanoraceae
- Genus: Lecanora
- Species: L. ussuriensis

Binomial name
- Lecanora ussuriensis S.Y.Kondr., Lőkös & Hur (2014)

Species of lichen

Lecanora ussuriensis is a species of saxicolous (rock-dwelling) lichen in the family Lecanoraceae. It is found in single localities in the Primorsky Krai region of the Russian Far East, as well as in Japan.

== Taxonomy ==
Lecanora ussuriensis was formally described as a new species in 2014 by lichenologists Sergey Kondratyuk, Laszlo Lőkös, and Jae-Seoun Hur. The type specimen was collected near the Zapredeljnoe settlement in Slavyanka, (Khasansky District of Primorsky Krai); there it was found growing on silicate rocks along the seashore. The botanical name ussuriensis refers to the type locality.

== Description ==
Lecanora ussuriensis has an areolate thallus measuring 1–3 cm (0.4–1.2 in) in diameter, and a colour ranging from dull whitish or whitish grey to dull grey, lead-grey or dull brownish grey. The thallus has patches of soredia that are whitish to whitish grey, sometimes with a yellowish tinge; individual soredia are 20–40 μm in diameter, and there are typically aggregated in larger structure called consoredia that are 45–100 μm across. The apothecia, which are elevated above the thallus surface, measure 0.5–1.5 mm in diameter, and are lecanorine in form with a brownish, shiny disc that is initially flat before becoming somewhat convex. The ascospores number eight per ascus, and are hyaline and ellipsoid, with dimensions of 10–12 by 5.5–7 μm.

The expected results of standard chemical spot tests for the lichen are: thallus K+ (deep yellow), KC+ (yellow), C−, P− (or weakly yellowish); the soredial mass tests K+ (yellow), KC+ (yellow), C−, and P−.

Similar species include Lecanora cavicola (found in Europe, North America and New Zealand) and L. pannonica (Eurasia and southwestern North America). They are distinguished from L. ussuriensis mainly by differences in colour and in chemistry. The Korean species Mikhtomia geumohdoensis is also similar in appearance, but its thallus is much smaller and thinner and lacks yellow colouring, and its soralia has a different morphology.

== Habitat and distribution ==
Previously known only from the type locality, Lecanora ussuriensis was reported from Tateyama, Chiba, Japan in 2019. Other closely associated lichens include Rusavskia mandzhurica, Catillaria cf. chalybaea, and unidentified species from the genera Caloplaca, Lecania, Lecanora, and Lepraria, and Yoshimuria galbina.

== See also ==
- List of Lecanora species
