= Peretychikha =

Human settlement in Terneysky District, Primorsky Krai, Russia

Coordinates: 47°15′10″N 138°38′35″E

Peretychikha (Russian: Переты́чиха) is a village (selo) in Terneysky District of Primorsky Krai, Russia, located on the Yedinka River near the Samarga River. Population: 136 (2002). The village lies 26 meters (85 ft) above the sea level.

During the Soviet times, plans existed to connect Agzu, the most isolated settlement of Primorsky Krai, and Peretychikha with an autoroute.

The majority of Peretychikha's population is employed in the timber industry.
