= Primorsky, Primorsky Krai =

Settlement in Russia

Coordinates: 43°05′55″N 131°35′30″E

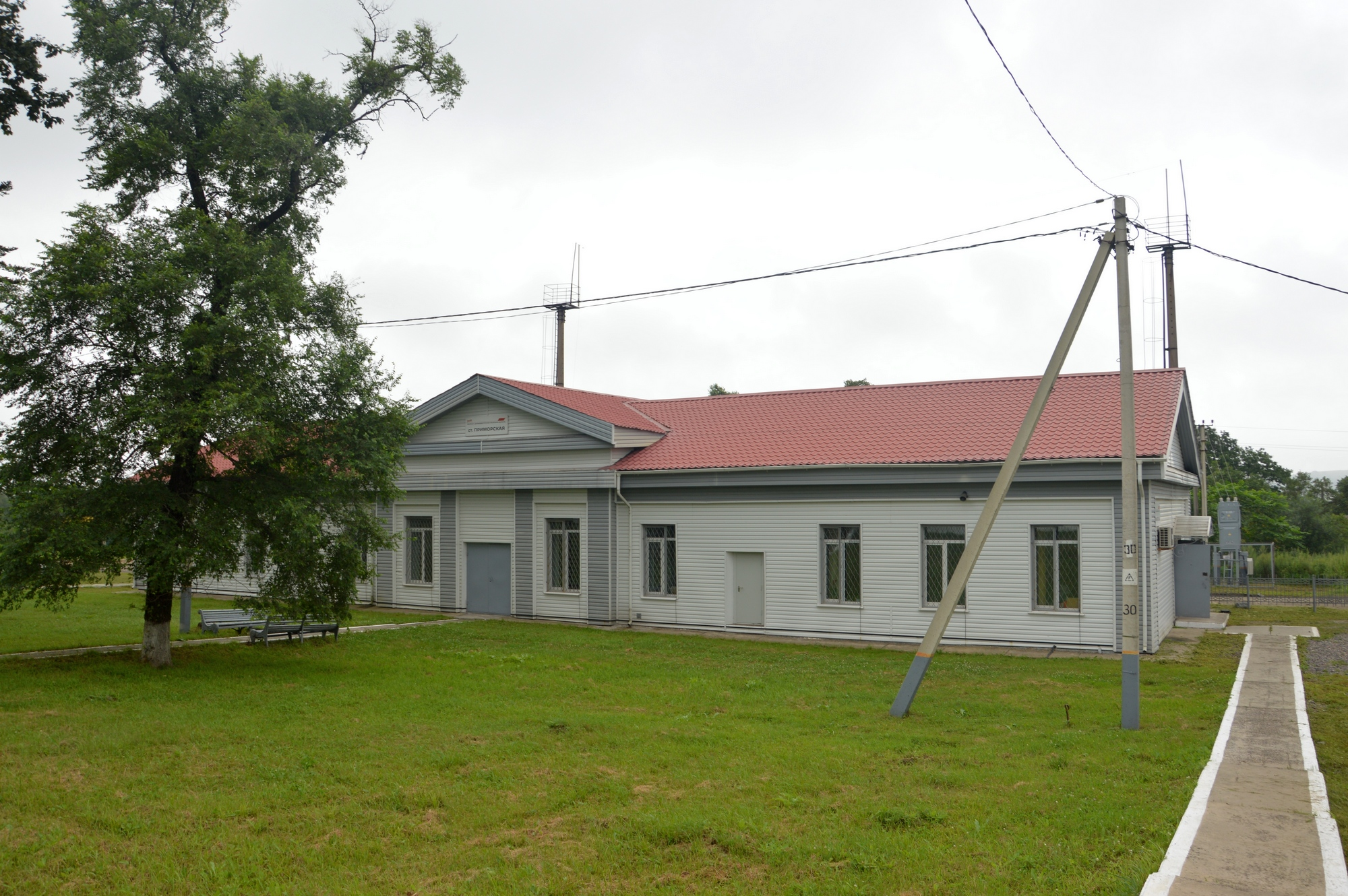
Primorskaya Station in the village of Primorsky

Primorsky (Russian: Примо́рский) is an urban locality (an urban-type settlement) in Khasansky District of Primorsky Krai, Russia, located on the Kedrovaya River 22 kilometers (14 mi) west of Vladivostok and 30 kilometers (19 mi) northeast of the district's administrative center of Slavyanka. Population: 2,241 (2010 census); 1,750 (2002 census); 1,509 (1989 Soviet census).

== History ==
It was founded in 1938 and granted urban-type settlement status in 1950.

== Transportation ==
There is a railway station of the Ussuriysk-Khasan railroad in Primorsky.
