= Rudny =

Rudny (masculine), Rudnaya (feminine), or Rudnoye (neuter) may refer to:

- Rudny, Russia (Rudnaya, Rudnoye), name of several inhabited localities in Russia
- Rudny, Kazakhstan, a city in Kostanay Province, Kazakhstan

== See also ==
- Rudno (disambiguation)
- Rudna (disambiguation)
- Rudná (disambiguation)
- Besiekierz Rudny, a village in the administrative district of Gmina Zgierz, Poland
