= Poyma =

Poyma may refer to:

- Poyma (river), a river in Primorsky Krai, Russia
- Poyma (Biryusa), left tributary of the Biryusa in Irkutsk Oblast, Russia
- Poyma, Russia, several rural localities in Russia
- Poyma, West Kazakhstan, a village in Terekti District, West Kazakhstan Region, Kazakhstan
- An alternate spelling of Poima, Ukraine
