= Rudná =

Rudná may refer to places:

== Czech Republic ==
- Rudná (Prague-West District), a town in the Central Bohemian Region,
- Rudná (Svitavy District), a municipality and village in the Pardubice Region
- Rudná pod Pradědem, a municipality in the Moravian-Silesian Region

== Slovakia ==
- Rudná, Rožňava District, a municipality and village

== See also ==
- Rudna (disambiguation)
- Ruda (disambiguation)
- Rudny (disambiguation)
