= Khrustalny =

Urban locality in Kavalerovsky District, Primorsky Krai, Russia

Coordinates: 44°21′02″N 135°05′50″E

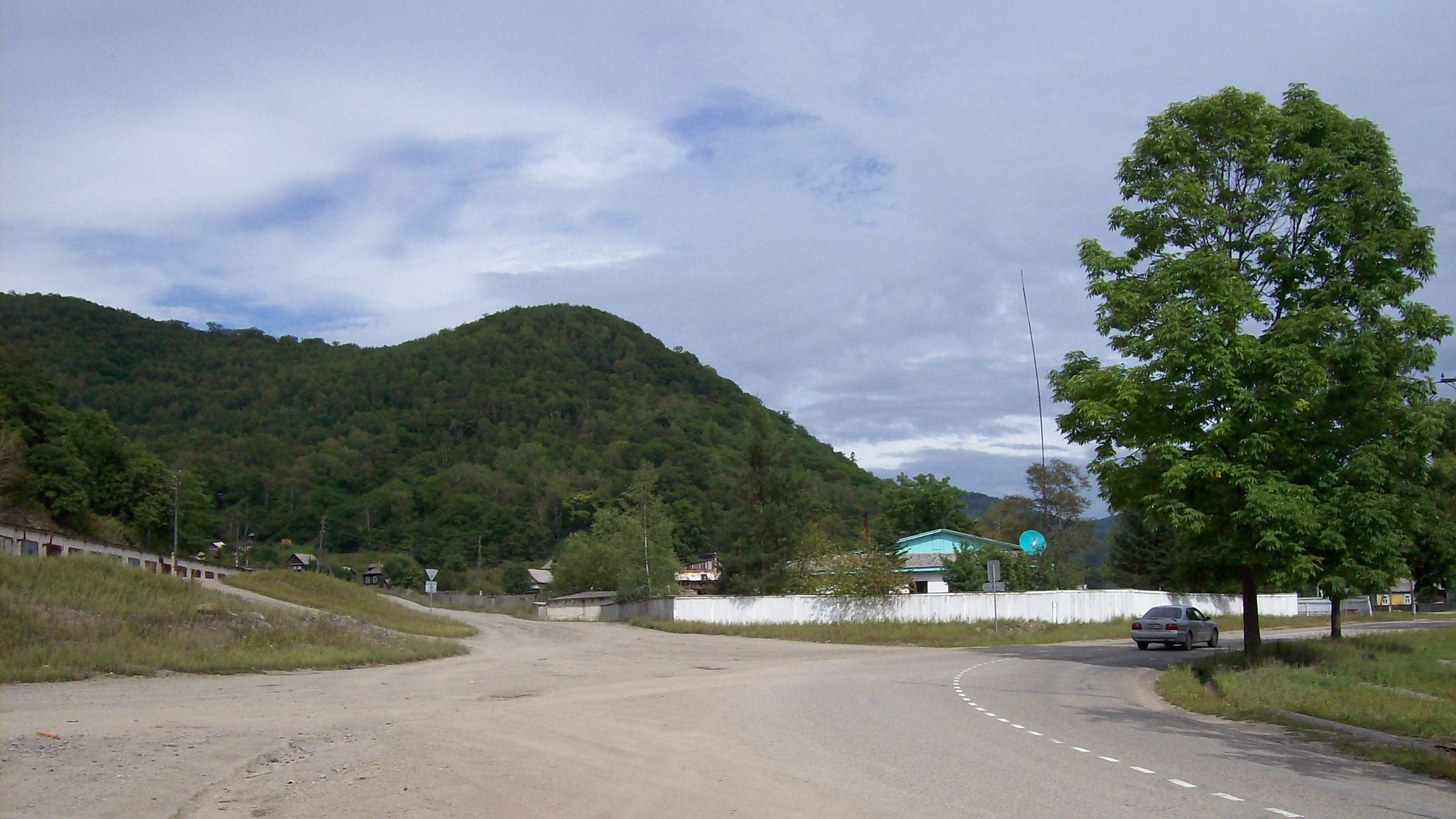

Khrustalny (Russian: Хруста́льный) is an urban locality (an urban-type settlement) in Kavalerovsky District of Primorsky Krai, Russia, located 7 kilometers (4.3 mi) from the district's administrative center of Kavalerovo. Population: 3,138 (2010 census); 3,664 (2002 census); 5,577 (1989 Soviet census). Postal code: 692426. Urban-type settlement status was granted to Khrustalny in 1954.
