= Dalnegorsky =

Dalnegorsky (masculine), Dalnegorskaya (feminine), or Dalnegorskoye (neuter) may refer to:

- Dalnegorsky District, a former district of Primorsky Krai, Russia
- Dalnegorsky Urban Okrug, a municipal formation, which the town of Dalnegorsk, Primorsky Krai, Russia, is incorporated as
