= Narva, Primorsky Krai =

Village in Khasansky District, Primorsky Krai, Russia

Coordinates: 43°02′40″N 131°26′05″E

Narva (Russian: Нарва) is a village (selo) in Khasansky District of Primorsky Krai, Russia, situated by the Narva River about 6.5 kilometers (4.0 mi) from its discharge into the Narva Bay of the Amur Bay. Population: 2 (2005 est.).

It was founded in 1924 as Balastny Karyer Sidimi (Баластный Карьер Сидими) and given its present name in 1972 during the cleansing of Chinese place names in Primorsky Krai.
