= Plastun (urban-type settlement) =

Plastun Пластун
- Urban-type settlement
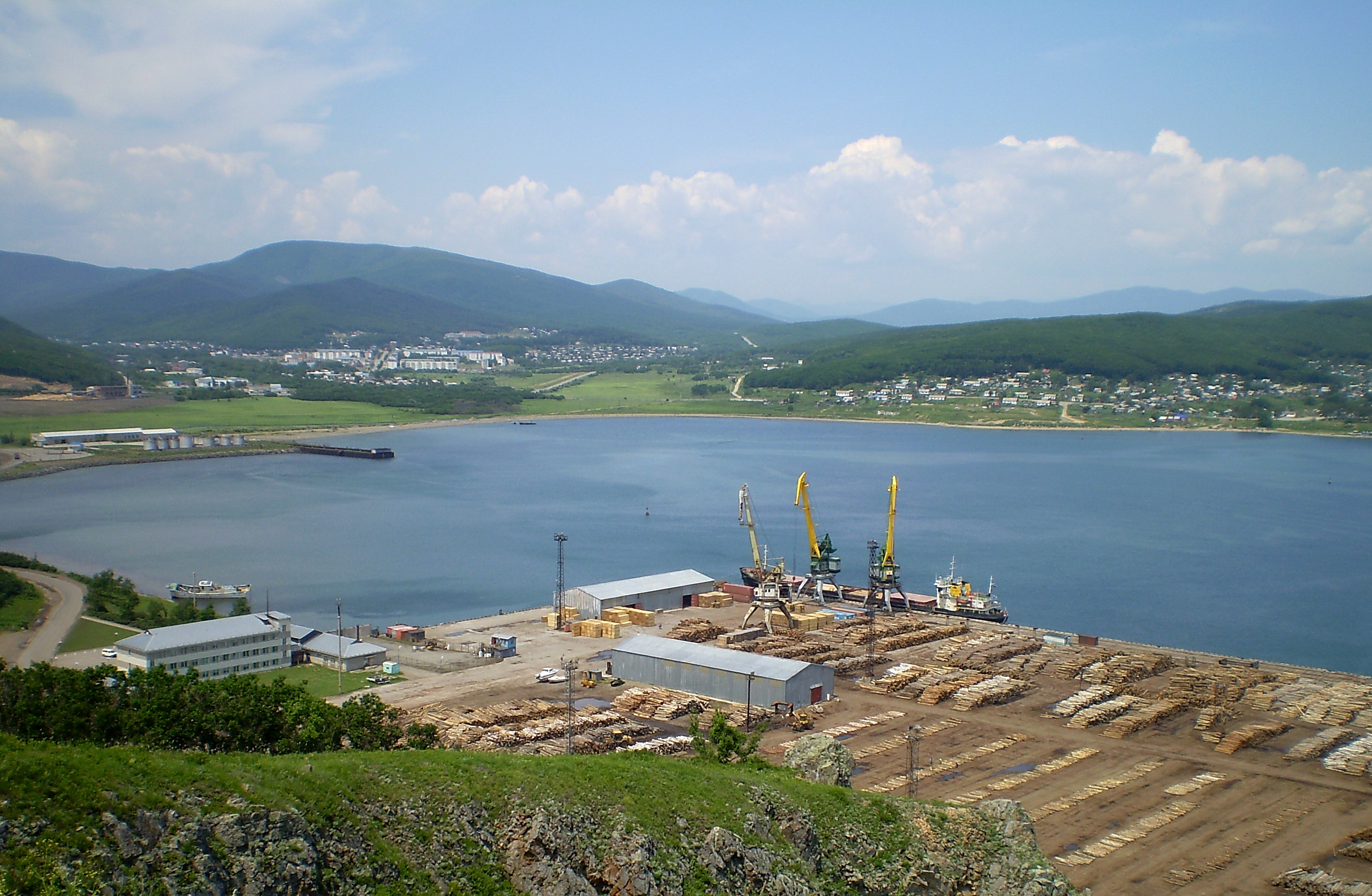
- View of Plastun
- Interactive map of Plastun
- Location of Plastun Plastun (Primorsky Krai)
- Coordinates: 44°45′N 136°17′E
- Country: Russia
- Federal subject: Primorsky Krai
- Administrative district: Terneysky District
- Founded: 1907

Population (2010 Census)
  - Total: 5,350
  - Estimate (2023): 4,712 (−11.9%)
- Time zone: UTC+10 (MSK+7)
- Postal code: 692152
- OKTMO ID: 05640155051

Plastun (Russian: Пласту́н) is an urban locality (an urban-type settlement) and the most populous settlement of Terneysky District of Primorsky Krai, Russia. Population: 5,350 (2010 census); 6,230 (2002 census); 5,957 (1989 Soviet census).

== History ==
It was founded in 1907 and named after the corvette Plastun which was surveying the coasts of Primorye in 1859.

== Economy ==
The industry of settlement is represented by a port and timber processing enterprises. There is an airport near Plastun with regular flights to Kavalerovo and Vladivostok.
