= Svetlaya, Primorsky Krai =

Svetlaya Све́тлая
- Location within Russia
- Coordinates: 46°32′N 138°19′E
- Country: Russia

Svetlaya (Russian: Све́тлая, lit. light, bright) is an urban locality (an urban-type settlement) in Terneysky District of Primorsky Krai, Russia, located in the mouth of the Svetlaya River. Population: 925 (2010 census); 1,136 (2002 census); 1,110 (1989 Soviet census).

== Economy ==
There is a large fish processing factory in Svetlaya. There are also extensive forests in the area. In the early 1990s in a joint venture with the South Korean company Hyundai, the hills of the Svetlaya plateau were clear cut. Later the partnership was ended.

Slaght, Jonathan C. “Owls of the Eastern Ice” New York, Farrar-Straus-Giroux, 2020, p 89.
