= Poyma, Russia =

Poyma (Russian: Пойма) is the name of several rural localities in Russia.

== Modern localities ==
- Poyma, Irkutsk Oblast, a village in Tayshetsky District of Irkutsk Oblast
- Poyma, Primorsky Krai, a selo in Khasansky District of Primorsky Krai

== Alternative names ==
- Poyma, alternative name of Loyma, a selo in Loyma selo Administrative Territory of Priluzsky District in the Komi Republic; 60°33′N 48°49′E
