= Kavalerovo =

Kavalerovo Кавалерово
- Urban-type settlement
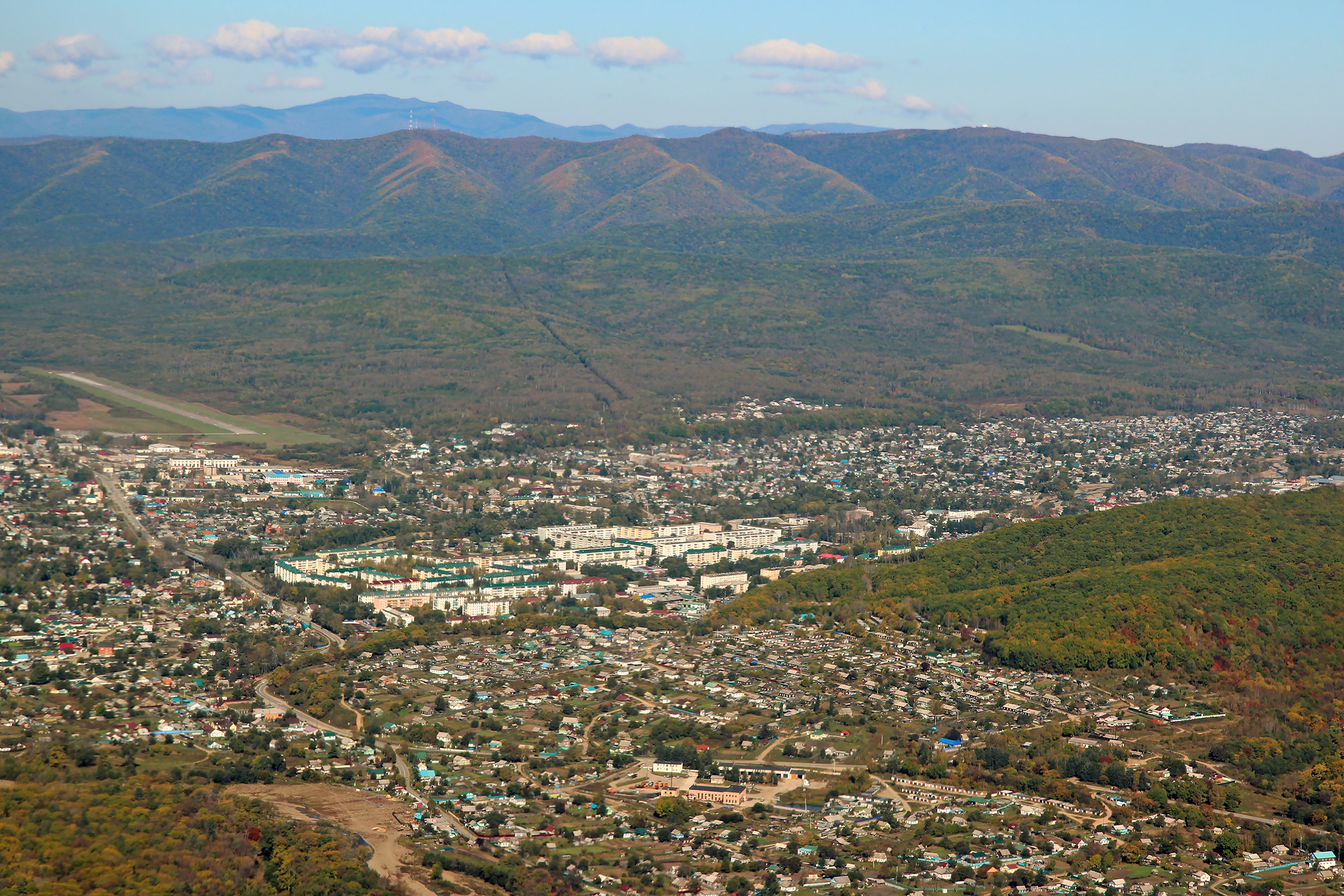
- Interactive map of Kavalerovo
- Location within Russia
- Coordinates: 44.2705°N 135.0547°E
- Country: Russia
- Federal subject: Primorsky Krai
- Region: Kavalerovsky District
- Founded in: 1910
- Became an urban-type settlement in: 1950
- Founder: Fyodor Popolitov
- Named for: Cavalry

Government
  - Mayor: Buraya Angela Cyleimanovna
- Elevation: 225 m (738 ft)

Population (2024)
  - Total: 13,100
- Time zone: UTC+10 (Vladivostok Time)
- Postal Index: 692413
- Area code: +7 42375
- OKATO: 05210551
- OKTMO: 05610151051

Kavalerovo (Russian: Кавалерово) is an urban-type settlement (also known as an urban locality) and the administrative center of Kavalerovsky District of Primorsky Krai, Russia. The name comes from the settler, holder of the Cross of St. George Fyodor Dmitrievch Popolitov (Russian: Фёдор Дмитриевич Пополитов).

== Geography ==
Located in the valley of the river Zerkalnaye, the river Kavalerovka (Russian: Кавалеровка) flows through the locality. The settlement is directly connected via road to the towns Khrustalny and Rudny, and to the village of Ustinovka

== History ==
Kavalerovo was founded in 1910 by Fyodor Dmitrievch Popolitov, native Voronezh Governoratе. Kavalerovo was given the status of an urban-type settlement in 1950. The town was named after cavalry.

== Economics ==
The economics of the region in the soviet era was driven by a mining plant; Khructalnensky Gorno-Obogatitelni Kombinat (Meaning: "Khrustalny mining and processing plant", Russian: Хрустальненский горно-обогатительный комбинат), which mined and processed polymetallic ore. It had tin and zinc, among other metals. The plant had 6 mines:

- "Hructalny",
- "Sentralny",
- "Cilinsky",
- "Vicokogorsky",
- "Lubileiny",
- "Arsenyevsky"

and 3 refining factories:

- SOV or OV №1 — Fabrichny,
- OV №2 — Rudny,
- OV №3 — Vicokogorck

After the collapse of the Soviet Union, the plant closed down.

One of the remaining industries left is logging, but it is hampered by the complex terrain of the Sikhote-Alin mountain range. Agriculture is largely undeveloped in the region due to the terrain. The most fertile land is located in the delta of the river Zerkalnaye. The Sikhote-Alin mountain range protects the north-west region from sea fog and rainy weather, creating favorable conditions for beekeeping

== Transport ==
There is regional bus service, one of the routes being Kavalerovo — Ustinovka — Suvorovo — Bogopol — Zerkalnoye.

The settlement has its own aerodrome. There are flights from and to the airport "Владивосток" on the Viking DHC-6 Twin Otter everyday. All flights are done by the company Aurora. Before the 1990s, flights were flown on the Yak-40 to Vladivostok, and An-2 to Terney and Plastun. The aerodrome uses 2 Eurocopter AS-350 B3e and a Mi-8 for air medical services.

== Climate ==
Kavalerovo

Climate chart (precipitation, max. and min. temperature)
J	F	M	A	M	J	J	A	S	O	N	D
7 −18 −11	17 −15 −7	19 −8 0	41 −1 8	58 5 15	66 9 19	75 14 23	97 15 23	47 10 19	42 3 11	42 −7 0	19 −16 −9
- █ Average max. and min. temperatures in °C
- █ Precipitation totals in mm
- Source: Weather Atlas
Imperial conversion
J	F	M	A	M	J	J	A	S	O	N	D
0.3 0 13	0.7 5 20	0.7 17 32	1.6 31 47	2.3 41 59	2.6 48 65	3 57 73	3.8 58 73	1.9 49 66	1.7 37 52	1.7 20 33	0.7 4 16
- █ Average max. and min. temperatures in °F
- █ Precipitation totals in inches

== Landmarks ==
- Cliff Dersu (Russian: Дерсу) is a natural fortification used during the Bohai times as a defensive-guarding point, controlling this area of the river Zerkalnoi. According to local myths, Vladimir Klavdiyevich Arsenyev and his guide Dersu Uzala met for the first time on this cliff.
- Museum of local lore — Regional museum of local lore, which opened May 8, 1985.
- The cave of crickets — Regional monument of nature.
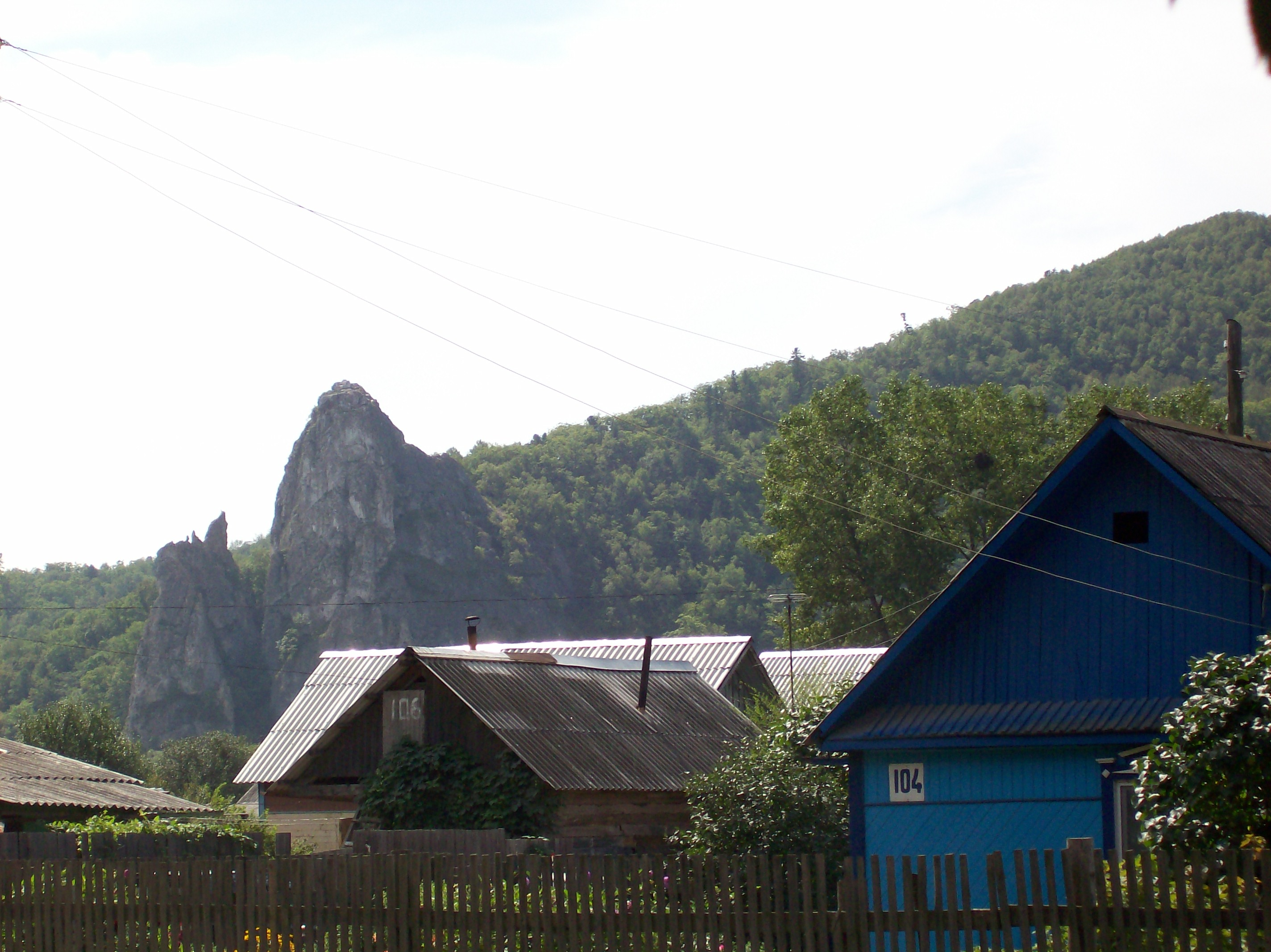
Cliff Dercy

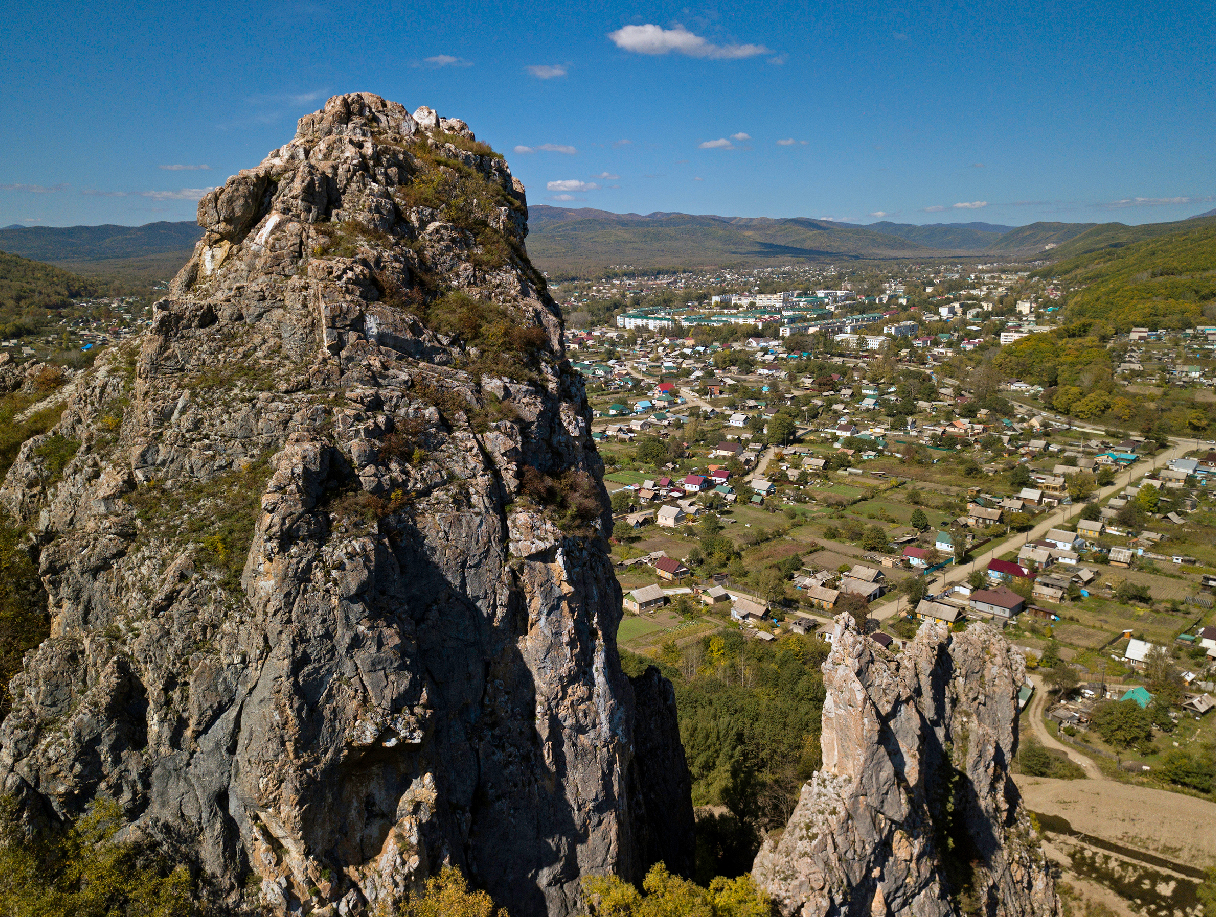
View of Kavalerovo from the cliff of Dercy

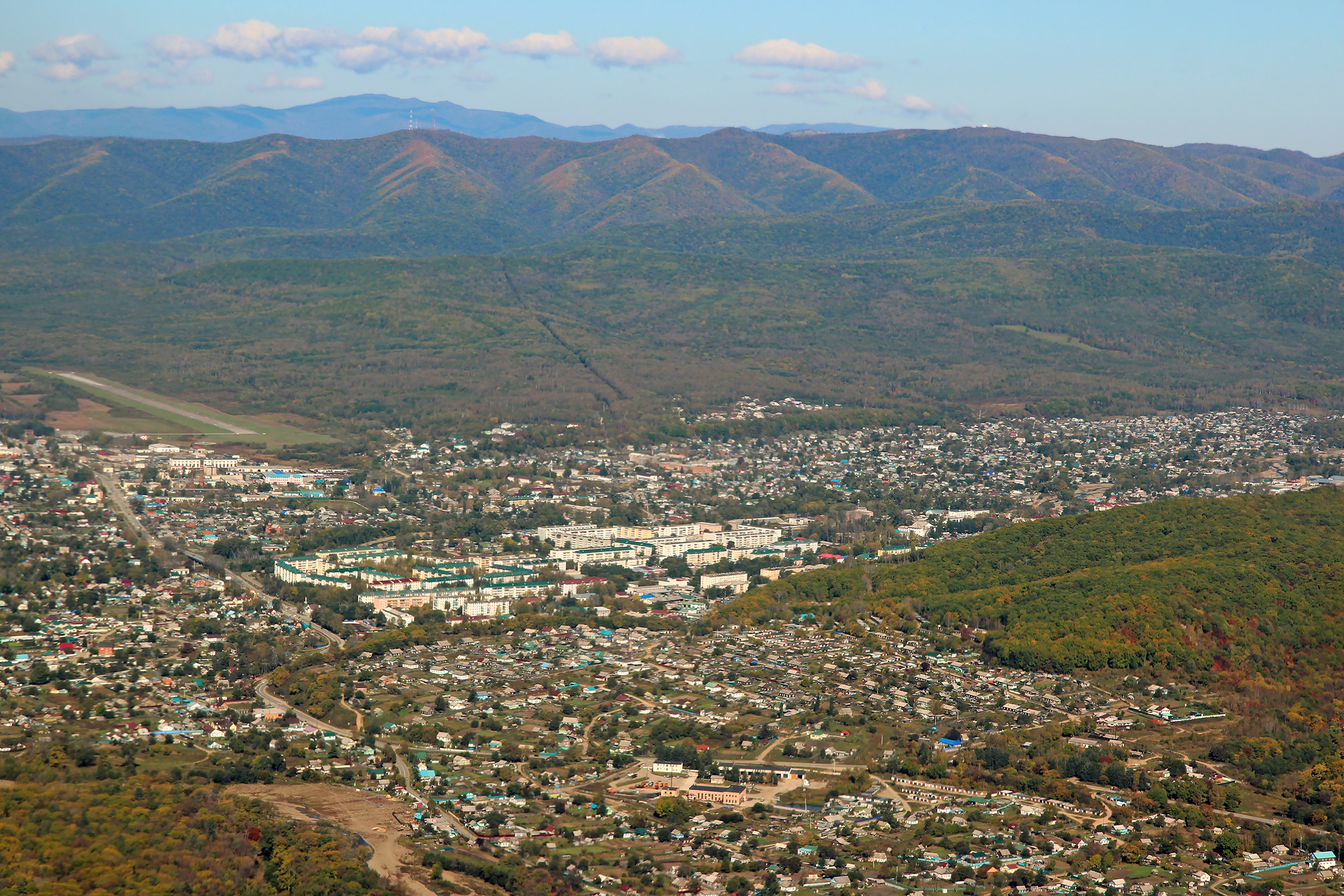
View of Kavalerovo from a descending airplane

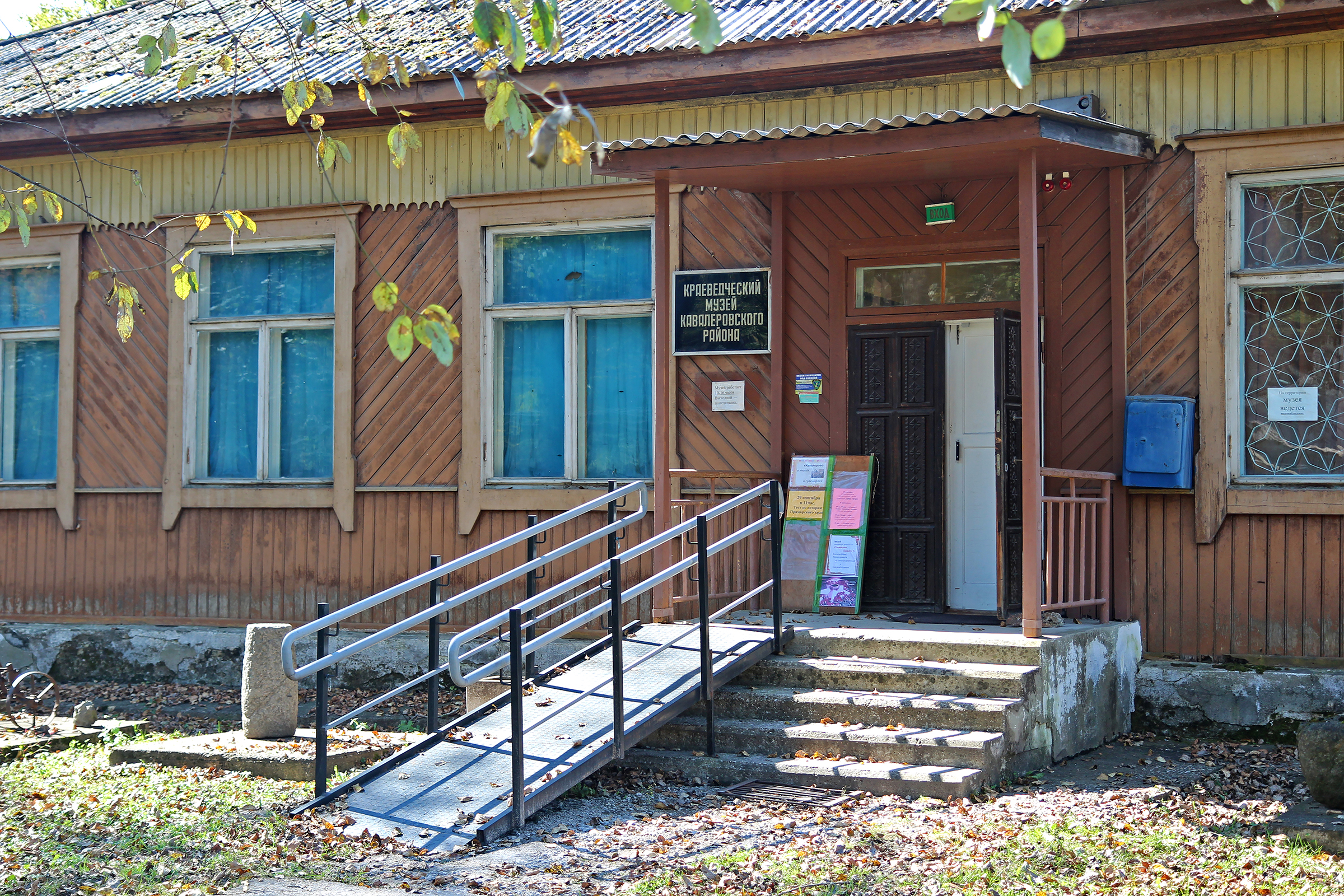
Kavalerovsky museum of local lore
