= Rudny, Republic of Bashkortostan =

Rudny Рудный
- Village
- Location within Bashkortostan Location within Russia
- Coordinates: 55°00′N 55°52′E
- Country: Russia
- Region: Bashkortostan
- District: Blagoveshchensky District
- Time zone: UTC+5:00

Rudny (Russian: Рудный) is a rural locality (a village) in Tugaysky Selsoviet, Blagoveshchensky District, Bashkortostan, Russia. The population was 26 as of 2010. There is a single street.

== Geography ==
Rudny is located 32 km southwest of Blagoveshchensk (the district's administrative centre) by road. Beryozovka is the nearest rural locality.
