= Agzu =

Village in Terneysky District, Primorsky Krai, Russia

Coordinates: 47°35′30″N 138°23′25″E

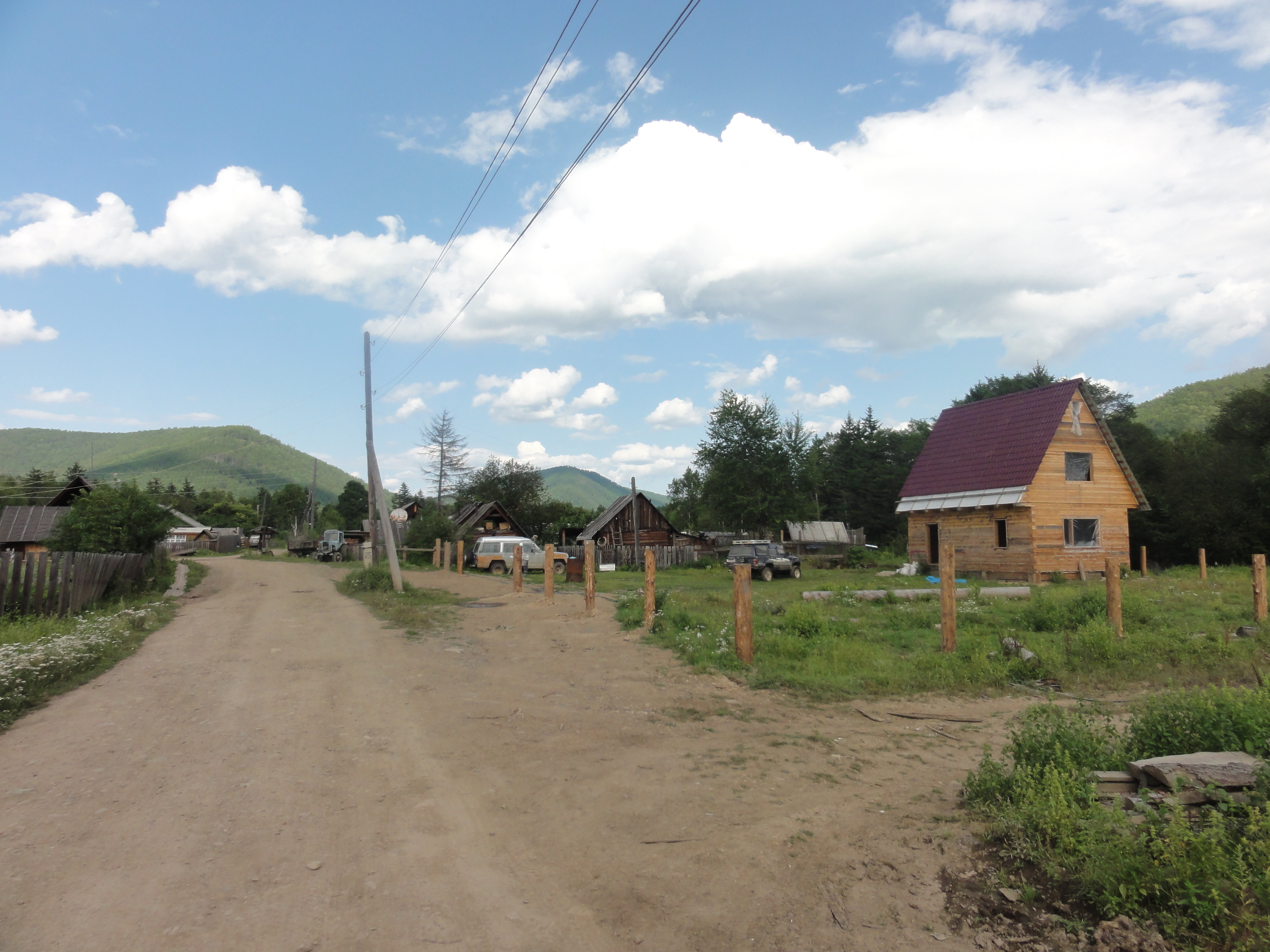
Street of Agzu Village

Agzu (Russian: Агзу́) is a village (selo) in Terneysky District of Primorsky Krai, Russia, located on the Samarga River. Population: 169 (2005 est.), 140 of which are Udege. During the Soviet era it served as a center of bushmeat production with the local people employed to hunt wild game and furs which were exported. This ended with the collapsed of the USSR and the Udege returned to subsistence hunting.

Agzu is the northernmost and most isolated inhabited locality of Primorsky Krai.
