= Novonikolsk, Primorsky Krai =

Novonikolsk Новоникольск
- Village
- Interactive map of Novonikolsk
- Location of Novonikolsk Novonikolsk (Primorsky Krai)
- Coordinates: 43°51′22″N 131°51′32″E
- Country: Russia
- Federal subject: Primorsky Krai
- Founded: official 1910 (real 1866)
- Village status since: 1910

Area
  - Total: 5.49 km^{2} (2.12 sq mi)
- Elevation: 32 m (105 ft)

Population (2010 Census)
  - Total: 4,449
  - Estimate (2021): 4,006 (−10%)
  - Density: 810/km^{2} (2,100/sq mi)

Municipal status
  - Urban okrug: Ussuriysky Urban Okrug
- Time zone: UTC+10 (MSK+7)
- Postal code: 692537
- Dialing code: +7 4234
- OKTMO ID: 05723000221
- Village Day: october

Novonikolsk (Russian: Новоникольск) is large village in the Ussuriysky Urban Okrug of Primorsky Krai of Russia. Novonikolsk is the center of a rural area which includes the villages of Elitnoe and Stepnoe.

Founded in 1866, but the official founding date of 1910 is considered.

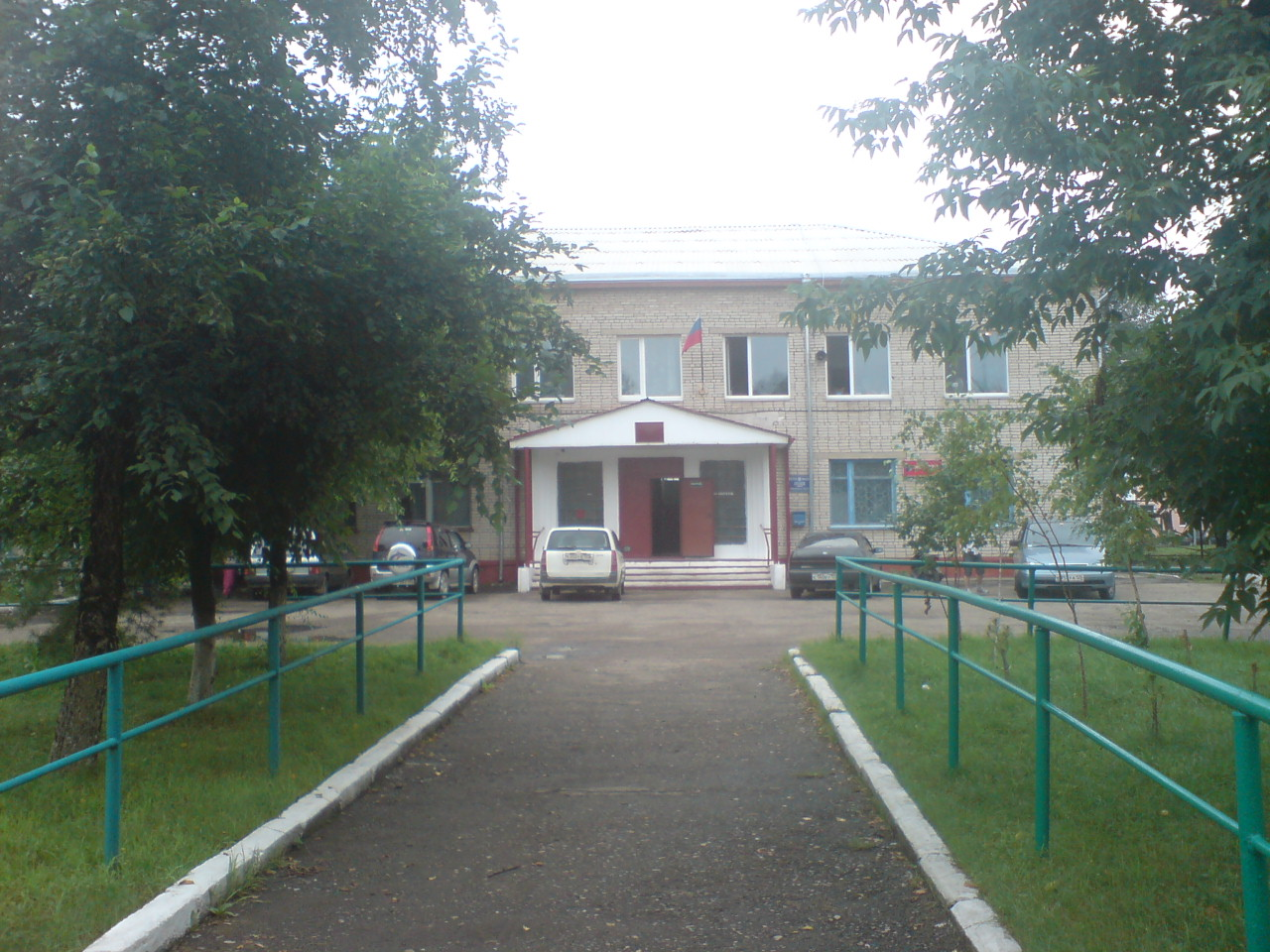
Village Council
