= Rudná, Rožňava District =

Village and municipality in Slovakia

Rudná Rozsnyórudna
- Municipality
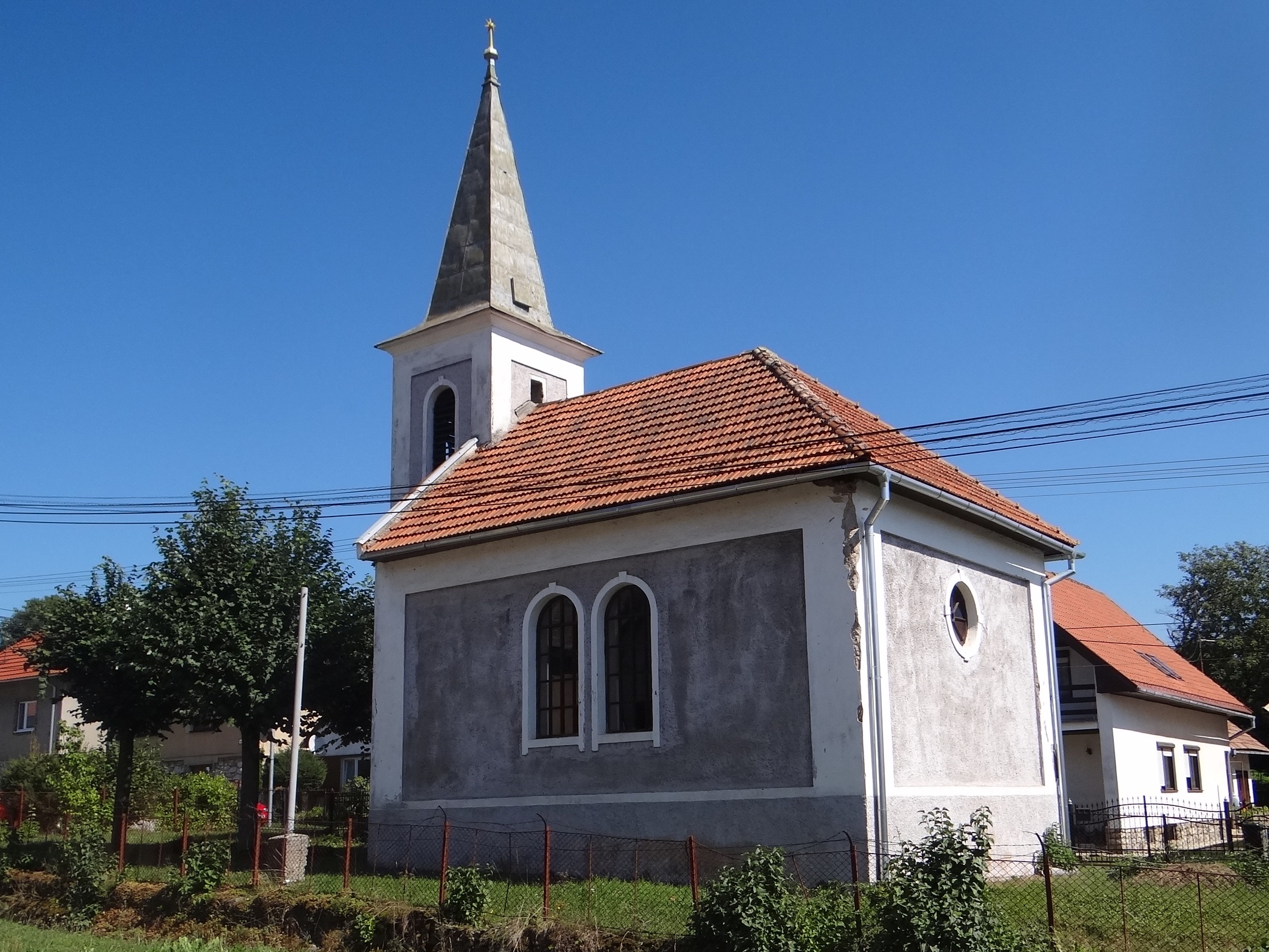

- Flag

- Location of Rudná in the Košice Region Location of Rudná in Slovakia
- Coordinates: 48.65°N 20.50°E
- Country: Slovakia
- Region: Košice Region
- District: Rožňava District
- First mentioned: 1219

Area
  - Total: 7.50 km^{2} (2.90 sq mi)
- Elevation: 369 m (1,211 ft)

Population (2025)
  - Total: 693
- Time zone: UTC+1 (CET)
  - Summer (DST): UTC+2 (CEST)
- Postal code: 480 1
- Area code: +421 58
- Vehicle registration plate (until 2022): RV
- Website: www.obecrudna.sk

Rudná (Hungarian: Rozsnyórudna) is a village and municipality in the Rožňava District in the Košice Region of middle-eastern Slovakia.

== History ==
In historical records the village was first mentioned in 1219. Before the establishment of independent Czechoslovakia in 1918, Rudná was part of Gömör and Kishont County within the Kingdom of Hungary. From 1938 to 1945, it was again part of Hungary as a result of the First Vienna Award.

== Geography ==
The municipality lies at an altitude of 369 metres (1,211 ft) and covers an area of 7.50 km^{2} (2.90 sq mi) (2025).

== Population ==
Population statistic (10 years)
Year	1995	2005	2015	2025
Count	743	732	719	693
Difference		−1.48%	−1.77%	−3.61%

Population statistic
Year	2024	2025
Count	703	693
Difference		−1.42%

It has a population of 693 people (31 December 2025).

=== Ethnicity ===
Census 2021 (1+ %)
Ethnicity	Number	Fraction
Slovak	542	76.98%
Hungarian	263	37.35%
Total	704	

In year 2021 was 704 people by ethnicity 542 as Slovak, 263 as Hungarian, 3 as Irish, 3 as Romani, 3 as Not found out, 3 as German, 2 as Czech, 1 as Jewish, 1 as Vietnamese, 1 as Polish and 1 as Greek.

Note on population: The difference values of population numbers in the table "Population statistic" and in the sections "Ethnicity" & "Religion" is caused by the use of various statistical methods.

=== Religion ===
Census 2021 (1+ %)
Religion	Number	Fraction
None	321	45.6%
Roman Catholic Church	153	21.73%
Evangelical Church	115	16.34%
Calvinist Church	89	12.64%
Greek Catholic Church	11	1.56%
Total	704	

In year 2021 was 704 people by religion 321 from None, 153 from Roman Catholic Church, 115 from Evangelical Church, 89 from Calvinist Church, 11 from Greek Catholic Church, 3 from Other, 3 from United Methodist Church, 3 from Ad hoc movements, 1 from Jewish community, 1 from Eastern Orthodox Church, 1 from Jehovah's Witnesses, 1 from Not found out, 1 from Christian Congregations in Slovakia and 1 from Czechoslovak Hussite Church.

== Culture ==
The village has a public library and a football pitch.
