= Rudna =

For places in the Czech Republic and Slovakia, see Rudná (disambiguation).

Rudna may refer to:

- Rudna, Lower Silesian Voivodeship (south-west Poland)
- Rudna, Piła County in Greater Poland Voivodeship (west-central Poland)
- Rudna, Złotów County in Greater Poland Voivodeship (west-central Poland)
- Rudna, Lubusz Voivodeship (west Poland)
- Rudna, a village in Giulvăz Commune, Timiș County, Romania
