= Renaming of geographical objects in the Russian Far East =

1970s process in the Soviet Union

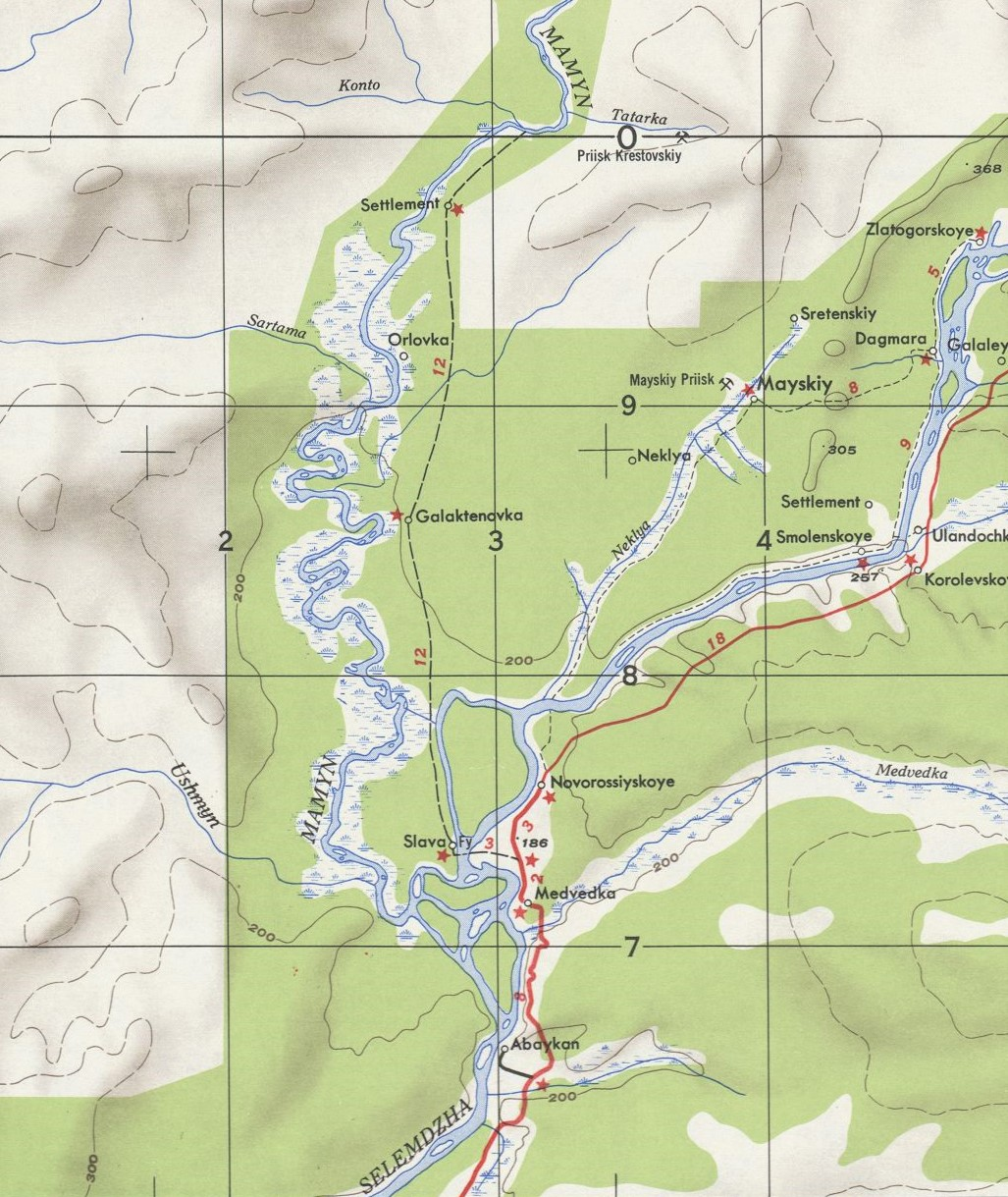
1947 USSR map section showing the Mamyn, a river that was renamed "Orlovka".

Geographical objects and settlements in the Russian Far East of the Soviet Union (Russian: Переименование географических объектов на Дальнем Востоке), in particular in Primorsky Krai, Khabarovsk Krai and Amur Oblast, underwent a massive process of change in names from predominantly Chinese and some local indigenous names to Russian-language ones, with the bulk of the changes occurring from 1972 to 1974. About 500 objects were renamed by the Soviet government, including 100 settlements. The renaming occurred as a result of the Soviet Union's armed conflict with China over Damansky Island in 1969. Many (but not all) place names that were replaced were of Chinese origin.

== History ==
Until 1972, in Primorsky Krai, the names of many geographical objects were of Chinese (because of China's proximity) or Tungus-Manchu (native) origin. To a lesser extent, such toponyms were found in Khabarovsk Krai and Amur Oblast.

The current territory of the region, before the Beijing Treaty of 1860 (when the region joined the Russian Empire), was considered a vassal territory of the Manchu people, who in the middle of the 17th century conquered China (along with Mongolia) and placed the Manchu-led Qing dynasty on the imperial throne.

The Russian settlers who founded military posts and the first estates lived for several decades on the territory of modern Primorsky Krai together with the peoples of the Manchu-Tungus group: Orochs, Udege, Nanai, a small number of Manchus and descendants of other peoples who were previously part of Jurchen and Manchu statehood by the indigenous population.

In the territory annexed to Russia by the Convention of Peking, a number of Chinese lived, mostly otkhodniks, since the permanent residence of the Chinese in the Manchu lands was limited, and at times outright prohibited, by the Qing dynasty. On the territory of what is now Primorsky Krai, ethnic Chinese were engaged in agriculture, hunting, fishing, robbery, mining (primarily gold), collecting wild plants (Ginseng), and trading.

By the time the first Russian sea posts of Posyet, Vladivostok, and Slavyanka appeared in the southern part of the region, native names of the Tungus-Manchu languages (Adimi, Sidimi, Hadimi, Talmi, Tuluchekoritsig) and Chinese (Suifun-he, Yanchi-he) coexisted.

Russian names appeared mainly around islands, capes and bays (Russky Island, Slavyanka Bay), since Russian colonization was initially naval. Native names were subsequently used by Russian settlers and remained until 1972.

=== Renaming campaign ===
In 1972–1974, as a result of the USSR's armed conflict with China over Damansky Island (1969), in Primorsky Krai and, to a lesser extent, in neighboring regions, a massive renaming of geographical objects and settlements was carried out in order to get rid of toponyms of Chinese origin.

At the same time, not only Chinese names were replaced (Suifun-he was renamed to the river Razdolnaya, Yanchi-he to the Tsukanovka River), but also Tungusic names (Adimi renamed to the Poyma river, Sidimi to the Narva River, Tulamu Bay to Slavyanka Bay).

Non-indigenous place names were also affected. For example, Amerika Bay and Manchzhur Bay were renamed Nakhodka Bay and Baklan Bay, respectively. These objects were originally named after the Russian sea vessels that explored the Pacific coast in the 19th century: the corvette Amerika and the gunboat Mandzhur. Any toponym whose sound showed unfavorable political connotations for that period was considered unreliable, regardless of the origin of this toponym.

As a result of the renaming, Primorsky Krai has largely lost its toponymic identity. Most of the new names are not associated with the region historically, ethnographically or geographically - for example, the Ilistaya River ("muddy", formerly Lefou), the Tikhaya River ("quiet", formerly Telyanza), Mount Obzornaya ("lookout", formerly Khalaza), Lazurnaya Bay ("azure", formerly Feldhausen or Shamora), - or they duplicate the Russian-language names of nearby objects - for example, the Arsenyevka River (formerly Daubikhe), the Razdolnaya River (formerly Suifun), Mount Livadiyskaya (formerly Pidan).

Among the small number of indigenous place names that have been preserved are the names of the Ussuri, Sungacha and Bikin rivers, as well as Lake Khanka.
