= Terney =

Terney Терней
- Urban-type settlement
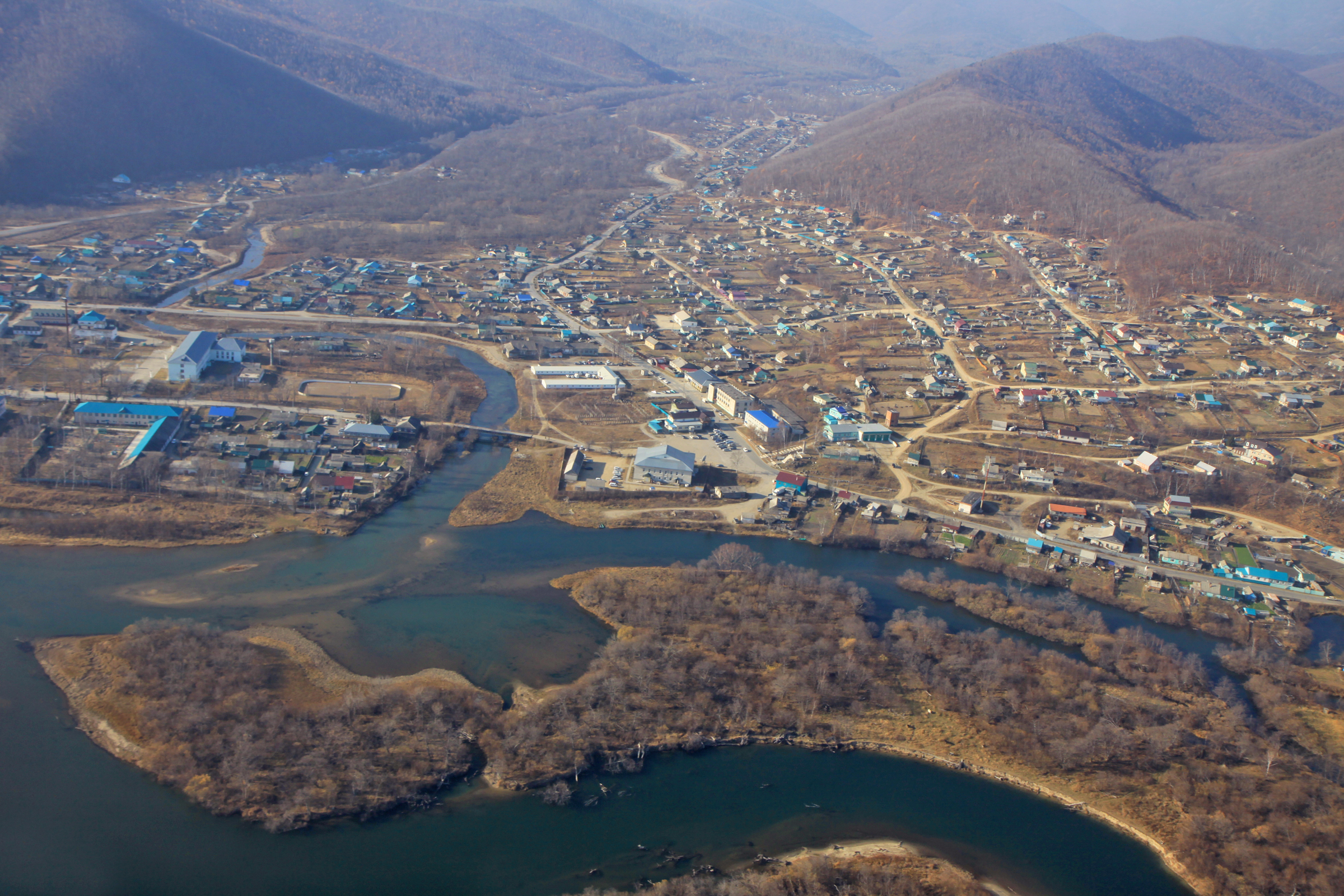
- Interactive map of Terney
- Location of Terney Terney (Primorsky Krai)
- Coordinates: 45°02′N 136°36′E
- Country: Russia
- Federal subject: Primorsky Krai
- Founded: 1908

Population
  - Estimate (2023): 2,856 )
- Time zone: UTC+10 (MSK+7)
- Postal code: 692150
- OKTMO ID: 05640151051

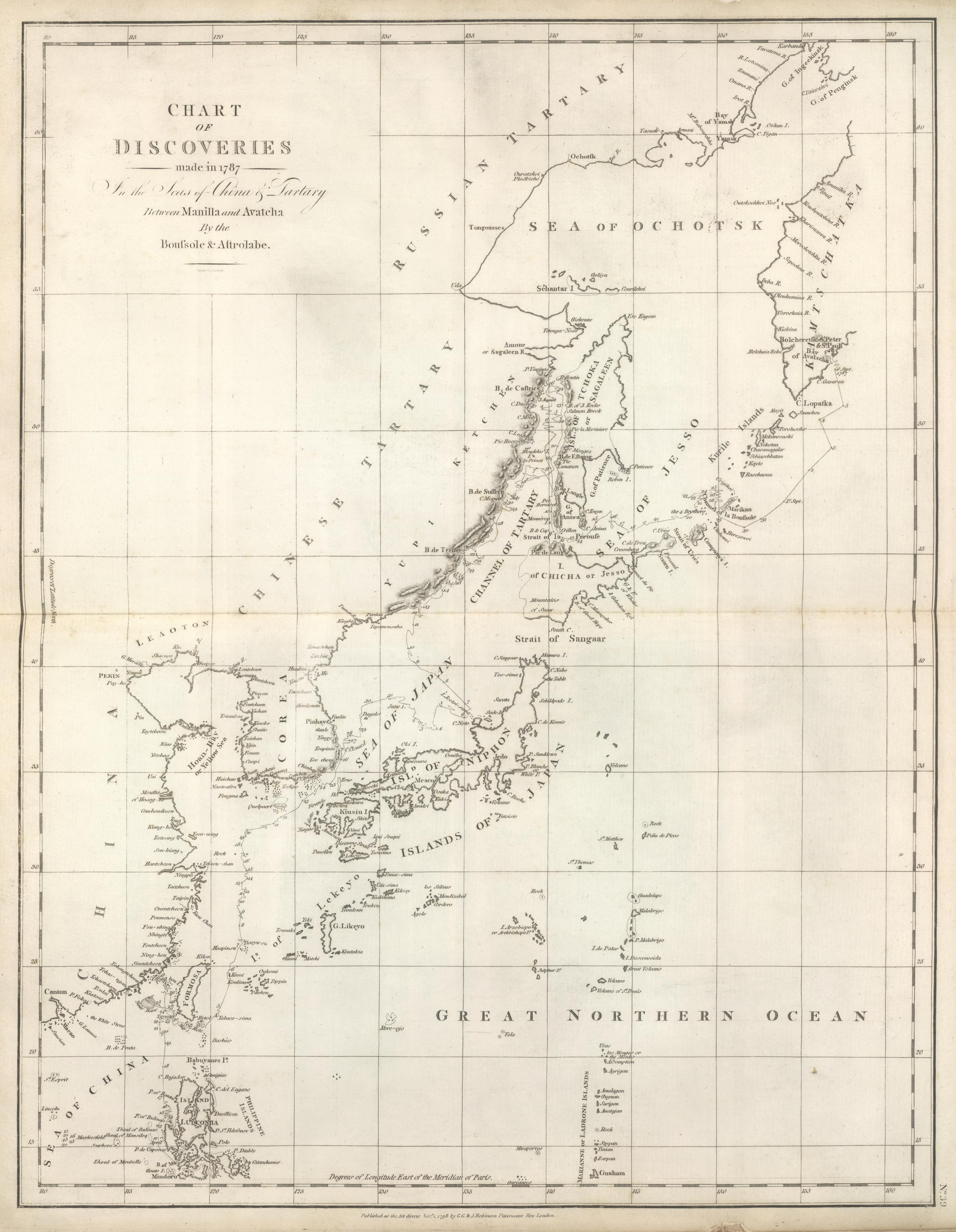
The route of La Perouse's expedition and the Bay of "Ternay"

Terney (Russian: Терне́й) is an urban locality (an urban-type settlement) and the administrative center of Terneysky District of Primorsky Krai, Russia, located on the coast of the Sea of Japan on a small bay of the same name. Population: 3,590 (2010 census); 3,971 (2002 census); 4,508 (1989 Soviet census). The locale was featured in the 1999 documentary titled In The Shadow Of The Tiger.

== History ==
The bay on which Terney is located was discovered on June 23, 1787 by Jean-François de La Pérouse on his way from Manila to Avacha Bay along the coast of what he called "the Tartary of the Manchus" (la Tartarie de Mantcheoux) and named, in French, Baie de Ternai. It was named after the French navigator Admiral Charles d'Arsac de Ternay (French: Baie de Ternay). It was here that the French explorers became convinced that the coast visited by Maarten Gerritsz Vries in the Castricum in 1643 (i.e., in fact, the east coasts of Hokkaido and Sakhalin) was not the mainland, since they were now at the same latitude as the Dutch had been a century and a half before, but the location looked entirely different. La Perouse's sailors were impressed with good fishing in the area. They explored the area around the bay, but did not see any live residents. They did, however, find a native grave, and upon opening it saw that the dead wore clothes made of Chinese fabrics and decorated with Chinese coins, which indicated that the local tribes had some commerce with the Chinese or Manchu.

The present Russian settlement was founded in September 1908.

== Climate ==
Terney has a humid continental climate (Köppen Dfb). Due to the influence of the cold Oyashio Current summers are up to 6 °C or 10.8 °F cooler than in Harbin, and that cold current produces a marked seasonal lag, so that September is on average warmer than June. Despite the fairly heavy rainfall due to orographic influences from mountains near the Pacific, Terney is much sunnier than nearby localities on the Sakhalin Island.

Climate data for Terney
Month	Jan	Feb	Mar	Apr	May	Jun	Jul	Aug	Sep	Oct	Nov	Dec	Year
Record high °C (°F)	7.3 (45.1)	11.8 (53.2)	22.0 (71.6)	27.5 (81.5)	33.8 (92.8)	36.6 (97.9)	37.8 (100.0)	36.5 (97.7)	30.8 (87.4)	27.2 (81.0)	20.2 (68.4)	8.9 (48.0)	37.8 (100.0)
Mean daily maximum °C (°F)	−5.9 (21.4)	−2.1 (28.2)	3.7 (38.7)	10.2 (50.4)	14.4 (57.9)	17.0 (62.6)	21.0 (69.8)	23.6 (74.5)	20.8 (69.4)	14.1 (57.4)	3.8 (38.8)	−4.8 (23.4)	9.7 (49.4)
Daily mean °C (°F)	−11.4 (11.5)	−8.2 (17.2)	−2.1 (28.2)	3.9 (39.0)	8.4 (47.1)	12.1 (53.8)	16.7 (62.1)	18.7 (65.7)	14.8 (58.6)	7.6 (45.7)	−1.7 (28.9)	−9.9 (14.2)	4.1 (39.3)
Mean daily minimum °C (°F)	−15.1 (4.8)	−12.9 (8.8)	−6.8 (19.8)	−0.5 (31.1)	4.2 (39.6)	9.1 (48.4)	14.0 (57.2)	15.4 (59.7)	10.1 (50.2)	2.7 (36.9)	−5.7 (21.7)	−13.4 (7.9)	0.1 (32.2)
Record low °C (°F)	−30.2 (−22.4)	−27.8 (−18.0)	−25.6 (−14.1)	−11.3 (11.7)	−4.6 (23.7)	−1 (30)	1.9 (35.4)	3.1 (37.6)	−6.9 (19.6)	−9.8 (14.4)	−21.7 (−7.1)	−27.8 (−18.0)	−30.2 (−22.4)
Average precipitation mm (inches)	29.1 (1.15)	16.2 (0.64)	37.0 (1.46)	51.6 (2.03)	89.2 (3.51)	96.5 (3.80)	125.7 (4.95)	119.4 (4.70)	124.8 (4.91)	76.3 (3.00)	44.3 (1.74)	32.8 (1.29)	842.9 (33.18)
Average precipitation days (≥ 1.0 mm)	6.8	4.3	8.4	10.0	12.5	12.5	17.0	11.5	8.1	8.4	6.3	6.1	111.9
Mean monthly sunshine hours	176.7	189.2	217.0	198.0	192.2	159.0	151.9	167.4	201.0	213.9	174.0	170.5	2,210.8
Source 1: pogodaiklimat.ru (1991-2020)
Source 2: HKO (sunshine)
