= 53rd km =

53rd km 53-й км
- Settlement
- Location within Primorsky Krai Location within Russia
- Coordinates: 43°13′N 132°31′E
- Country: Russia
- Region: Primorsky Krai
- District: Shkotovsky District
- Time zone: UTC+10:00

53rd km (Russian: 53-й км) is a rural locality (a settlement) in Novonezhinskoye Rural Settlement of Shkotovsky District, Primorsky Krai, Russia. The population was 30 in 2010.

== Geography ==
The settlement is located in the Suhodol River valley, 11 km from Smolyaninovo and 110 km from Vladivostok.

== Streets ==
- Zheleznodorzhnaya
