= Samarga =

River in Russia

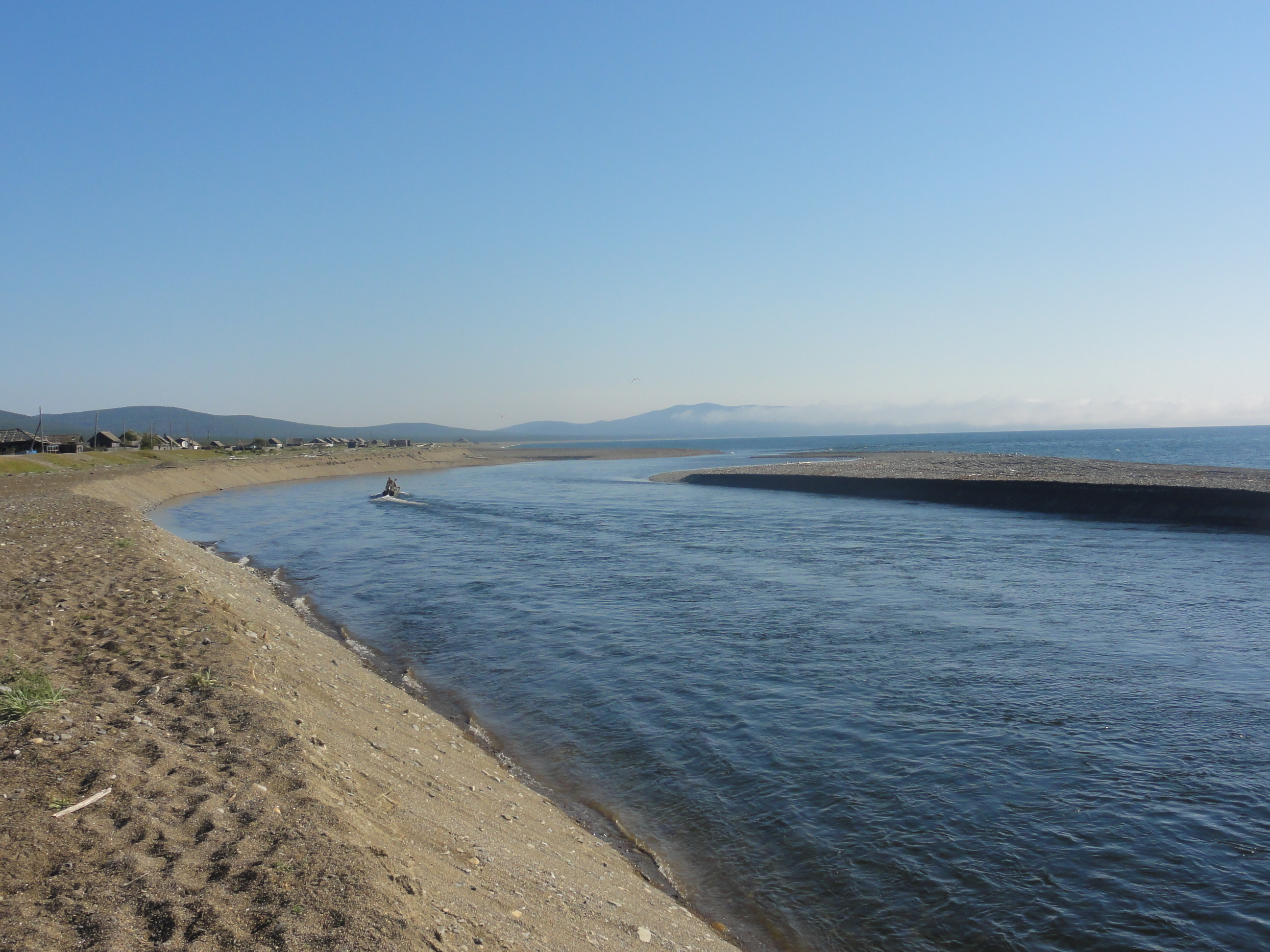

Location
- Country: Russia

Physical characteristics
- Mouth: Sea of Japan
  - coordinates: 47°13′34″N 138°47′17″E
- Length: 218 km (135 mi)
- Basin size: 7,760 km^{2} (3,000 sq mi)

The Samarga (Russian: Самарга) is the northernmost river in the Primorsky Krai territory in the far eastern part of Russia. It is 218 kilometres (135 mi) long, and has a drainage basin of 7,760 square kilometres (3,000 sq mi), making it the largest coastal river in the northern Sikhote-Alin mountain range. It flows into the Sea of Japan. The river system is a unique and relatively untouched centre of biodiversity in the Eastern Sikhote–Alin mountains because it is in a remote and mountainous region.

== Location ==
The river is located in the northeast Primorsky territory of Russia. The northern and western boundaries of the river's watershed form the border between Primorsky territory and Khabarovsk territory. It confluences into the Sea of Japan at Samarga, a small town on the coast of the sea. In the estuary on the sea side, there is a kind of blind creek named the "Samrga duct" which extends for about 5 kilometres (3.1 mi).

== Tributaries and watershed ==
Numerous small tributaries form a dense and extensive network in the watershed of the river.

The major left-hand tributaries of the Samarga, facing downstream, are: the Perepadnaya (30 kilometres (19 mi) long), the Dagdy (70 kilometres (43 mi)), the Moi (45 kilometres (28 mi)), the Isimi (45 kilometres (28 mi)), and the Agzu (30 kilometres (19 mi)). The Sobu, Zova, Dzolu, Kalashnikov, Takhalo, and Kipreinyi, among others, are minor tributaries.

The major right-hand tributaries are: the Pukhi (60 kilometres (37 mi) long), the Kuksi (30 kilometres (19 mi)), and the Bolshaya Sokhatka (36 kilometres (22 mi)). The Bugu, Zaami, and Unty are minor tributaries.

The Samarga’s average discharge is between 74 and 242 cubic metres (2,600 and 8,500 cu ft) per second. Its catchment area is around 7,760 square kilometres (3,000 mi^{2}). The length of the watershed boundary is 515 kilometres (320 mi). Floods are common in the summer and autumn.

== Fish ==
The Samarga watershed is so far the only place in the Primorsky territory with very high fish biodiversity and high natural fish productivity. The diversity of habitats provides for a wide variety of fish species.

A wide variety of fish, nearly 20 species –such as pink salmon, masu salmon, chum salmon, cherry salmon, Dolly Varden, white-spotted char, and grayling salmon – are abundant in the river and its tributaries. The river basin is also home to the largest population of a rare salmonid species – Sakhalin taimen. The Anadromous salmon (pink, masu, chum, and the less abundant coho) comprise a substantial part of the river biomass. The pink salmon stock is the largest, comprising 10% of the total population of pink salmon of the Russian mainland Sea of Japan coast. Masu salmon stocks rank second after pinks, and char are fairly abundant.

The production topography of the Samarga is also very interesting. The lowest part of the river – from Unty Creek to the river mouth – is a zone of pink salmon, chum, rainbow smelt, and grayling salmon. The middle part of the river – from Zova Creek to Unty Creek – is an area of pink salmon, adult masu, taimen, lenok, and grayling salmon. The upper reaches of the river – upstream from Zova Creek – are home to juvenile masu, taimen, and grayling salmon.

== Ecosystem ==
The Samarga basin is a unique ecosystem comprising many rare species of flora and fauna, including Japanese yew, ginseng, Amur tiger, Himalayan bear, Amur mountain goral, Gould’s merganser, and Blakiston's fish owl.

Rare plant species listed as endangered found in the Samarga watershed include: Japanese yew (Taxus cuspidata Siebold et Zucc. ex Endl.), woodland peony (Peonia obovata Maxim), ladyslippers (Cypripedium macranthon Sw., C. calceolus L., C. guttatum Sw.), two-rowed and candlestick lilies (Lilium distichum Nakai, L. pensylvanicum Ker-Gawl), Palibin’s edelweiss (Leontopodium palibinianum Beauv), and false juniper (Microbiota decussata Kom), among others.

== Resources and economy ==
The Samarga basin is very rich in timber, metals, and hunting and fishing resources, but because it is in an extremely remote and mountainous region, with harsh climatic conditions, the accessibility and extraction of the natural resources in this river system is very poor.

There are currently four small towns in the area: Yedinka, Peretychikha, Samarga and Agzu in the watersheds of the Yedinka and Samarga. According to the 2001 Census, the total population in the riverine watersheds is about 800 people, representing various ethnic groups. Out of this number, 140 belong to the Udege people, an indigenous ethnic group. The present-day Udege population of the basin lives primarily in one village – Agzu – while the residents of the remaining three towns are largely of Slavic origin. Almost the entire people of the river system is actively involved in fishing – pink salmon and Dolly Vardena only.
