= Rudná (Svitavy District) =

- Municipality
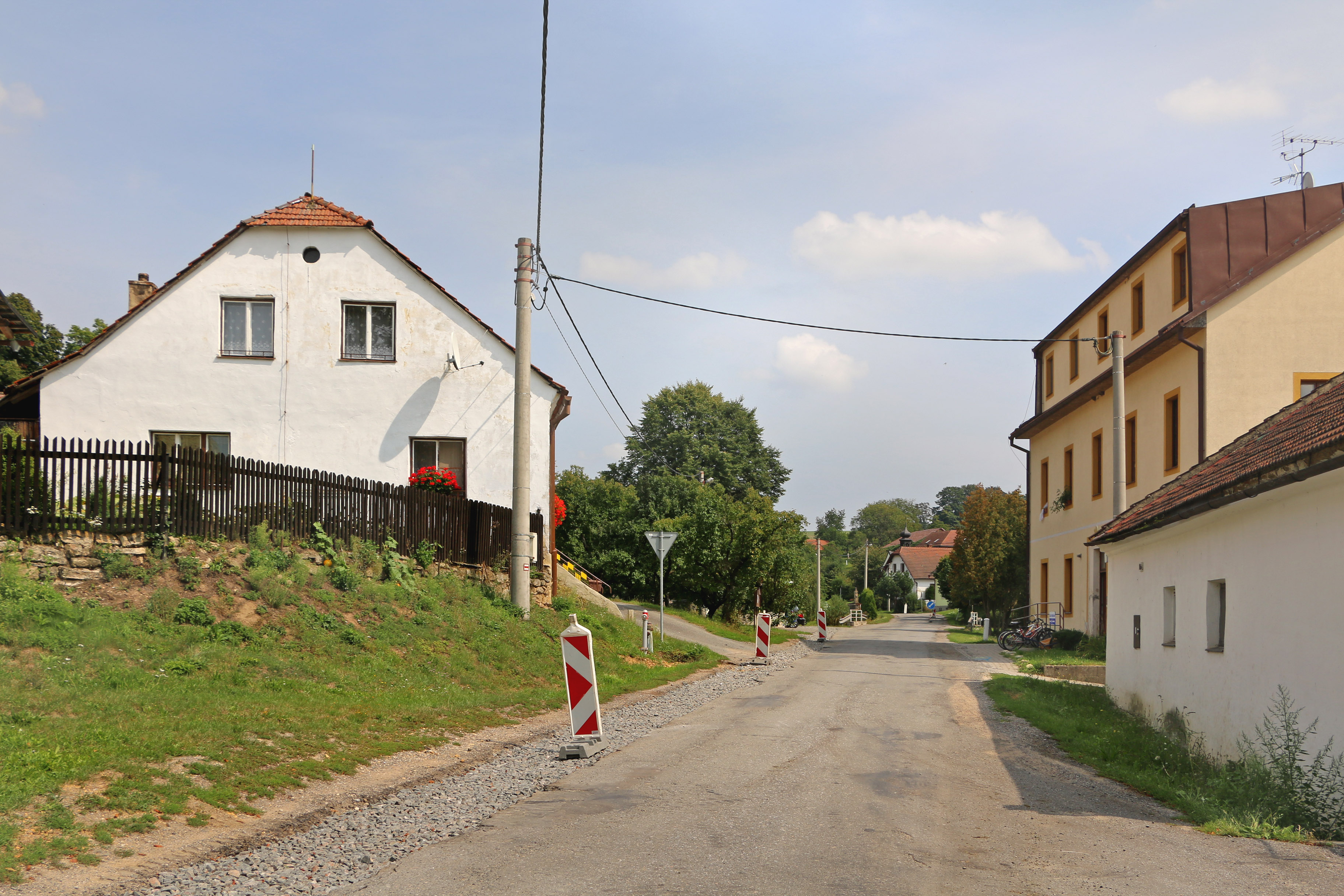
- Western part of Rudná

- Flag Coat of arms

- Location in the Czech Republic
- Coordinates: 49°39′33″N 16°34′24″E
- Country: Czech Republic
- Region: Pardubice
- District: Svitavy
- First mentioned: 1365

Area
  - Total: 6.61 km^{2} (2.55 sq mi)
- Elevation: 537 m (1,762 ft)

Population (2026-01-01)
  - Total: 137
  - Density: 20.7/km^{2} (53.7/sq mi)
- Time zone: UTC+1 (CET)
  - Summer (DST): UTC+2 (CEST)
- Postal code: 569 04
- Website: www.rudnasy.cz

Rudná is a municipality and village in Svitavy District in the Pardubice Region of the Czech Republic. It has about 100 inhabitants.

Rudná lies approximately 14 kilometres (9 mi) south-east of Svitavy, 71 km (44 mi) south-east of Pardubice, and 162 km (101 mi) east of Prague.

== Demographics ==
Historical population
Year	Pop.	±%
1869	519	—
1880	591	+13.9%
1890	694	+17.4%
1900	626	−9.8%
1910	611	−2.4%
1921	518	−15.2%
1930	498	−3.9%
1950	265	−46.8%
1961	285	+7.5%
1970	276	−3.2%
1980	239	−13.4%
1991	200	−16.3%
2001	200	+0.0%
2011	175	−12.5%
2021	144	−17.7%
Source: Censuses
