= Rudnaya Pristan =

Rudnaya Pristan Рудная Пристань
- Village
- Interactive map of Rudnaya Pristan
- Location of Rudnaya Pristan Rudnaya Pristan (Primorsky Krai)
- Coordinates: 44°21′31″N 135°48′37″E
- Country: Russia
- Federal subject: Primorsky Krai
- Founded: official 1910 (settlement began 1866)

Population (2010 Census)
  - Total: 2,107
  - Estimate (2021): 1,433 (−32%)
- Time zone: UTC+10 (MSK+7)
- Postal code: 692434
- OKTMO ID: 05707000116

Rudnaya Pristan (Russian: Ру́дная При́стань, lit. Ore Wharf) is a village (selo) located at the mouth of the Rudnaya River, on the Pacific coast of Primorsky Krai. It is situated 35 km east of Dalnegorsk (also in Primorsky Krai) and approximately 514 km north of Vladivostok. Its population was 2,107 in 2010, 2,389 in 2002, and 2,947 in 1989.

Lead smelting has been the town's primary industry since a plant was built there in 1930. The plant has provided steady employment for most of the area's families since that time, but at enormous cost to both the health of the residents and the local environment. The residents suffer from many health problems, including an inordinately high rate of cancer, and the soil has become heavily contaminated with lead-related by-products. The Blacksmith Institute consequently declared Rudnaya Pristan, along with Dalnegorsk, one of the ten worst polluted places on earth, although Anatoly Lebedev, leader of the ecological NGO BROK, disputes this inclusion.

Despite its coastal location, Rudnaya Pristan's harbor has remained largely undeveloped, and its climate is harsh, dominated in winter by the vast Siberian high-pressure system and in summer by remnants of the East Asian monsoon. This combination results in very cold, dry winters with generally high winds, and muggy summers that provide ideal conditions for the breeding of mosquitoes.

== Climate ==
Climate data for Rudnaya Pristan (extremes 1932–present)
Month	Jan	Feb	Mar	Apr	May	Jun	Jul	Aug	Sep	Oct	Nov	Dec	Year
Record high °C (°F)	8.6 (47.5)	12.2 (54.0)	23.5 (74.3)	31.7 (89.1)	35.4 (95.7)	34.3 (93.7)	37.8 (100.0)	35.6 (96.1)	31.4 (88.5)	27.9 (82.2)	22.3 (72.1)	11.0 (51.8)	37.8 (100.0)
Mean daily maximum °C (°F)	−4.9 (23.2)	−1.7 (28.9)	3.8 (38.8)	9.6 (49.3)	13.5 (56.3)	16.0 (60.8)	20.1 (68.2)	22.9 (73.2)	20.7 (69.3)	14.1 (57.4)	4.7 (40.5)	−3.6 (25.5)	9.6 (49.3)
Daily mean °C (°F)	−10.3 (13.5)	−7.4 (18.7)	−1.6 (29.1)	4.0 (39.2)	8.3 (46.9)	11.9 (53.4)	16.6 (61.9)	18.9 (66.0)	15.2 (59.4)	8.0 (46.4)	−1.0 (30.2)	−8.8 (16.2)	4.5 (40.1)
Mean daily minimum °C (°F)	−14.7 (5.5)	−12.6 (9.3)	−6.6 (20.1)	−0.6 (30.9)	4.4 (39.9)	9.1 (48.4)	14.0 (57.2)	15.6 (60.1)	10.1 (50.2)	2.5 (36.5)	−5.7 (21.7)	−13.3 (8.1)	0.2 (32.3)
Record low °C (°F)	−30.0 (−22.0)	−30.5 (−22.9)	−25.5 (−13.9)	−12.0 (10.4)	−4.1 (24.6)	0.2 (32.4)	3.6 (38.5)	1.9 (35.4)	−3.5 (25.7)	−11.3 (11.7)	−22.0 (−7.6)	−30.1 (−22.2)	−30.5 (−22.9)
Average precipitation mm (inches)	15.5 (0.61)	14.0 (0.55)	26.7 (1.05)	52.7 (2.07)	82.7 (3.26)	93.3 (3.67)	125.9 (4.96)	124.7 (4.91)	110.6 (4.35)	70.9 (2.79)	39.7 (1.56)	22.9 (0.90)	779.6 (30.68)
Source: pogoda.ru.net
