= Poyma (river) =

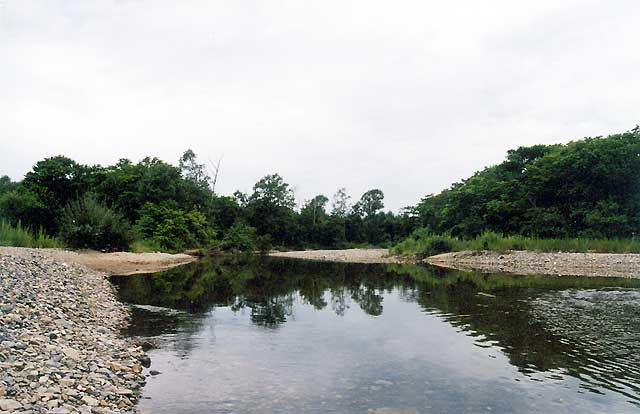

Location
- Country: Russia

Physical characteristics
- Source
  - location: Mount Lesozagotovitelnaya
- Mouth: Sea of Japan
  - location: Baklan Bay
  - coordinates: 42°49′37″N 131°21′46″E
- Length: 44 km (27 mi)
- Basin size: 274 km^{2} (106 sq mi)

The Poyma (Russian: Пойма, called Адими Adimi until 1972) is a river in Khasansky District, Primorsky Krai, Russia. It is 44 kilometres (27 mi) long, and has a drainage basin of 274 square kilometres (106 sq mi). The river rises on the southern slopes of Mount Lesozagotovitelnaya on the border with China (Black Mountains) and flows south, then bends to the southeast, finally emptying into the Baklan Bay of Peter the Great Gulf in the Sea of Japan. In its upper reaches the river has characteristics of a mountain stream. Downriver it flows through a swampy area.

Main tributaries: Malaya Poyma, Shkolnaya, Mutnaya.
