= Terneysky District =

Terneysky District Тернейский район (Russian)
- District
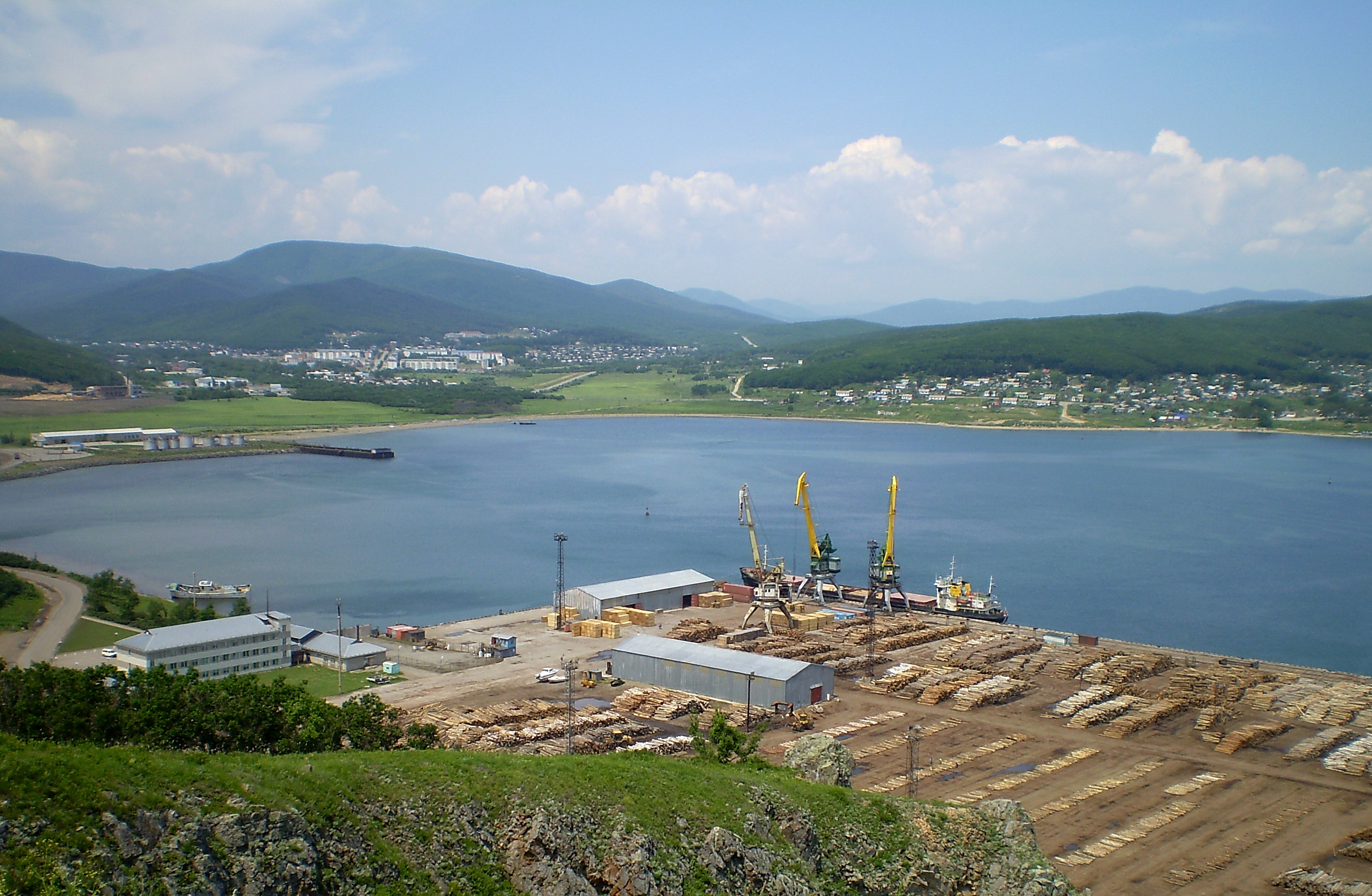
- View of Village Plastun from port, Terneysky District

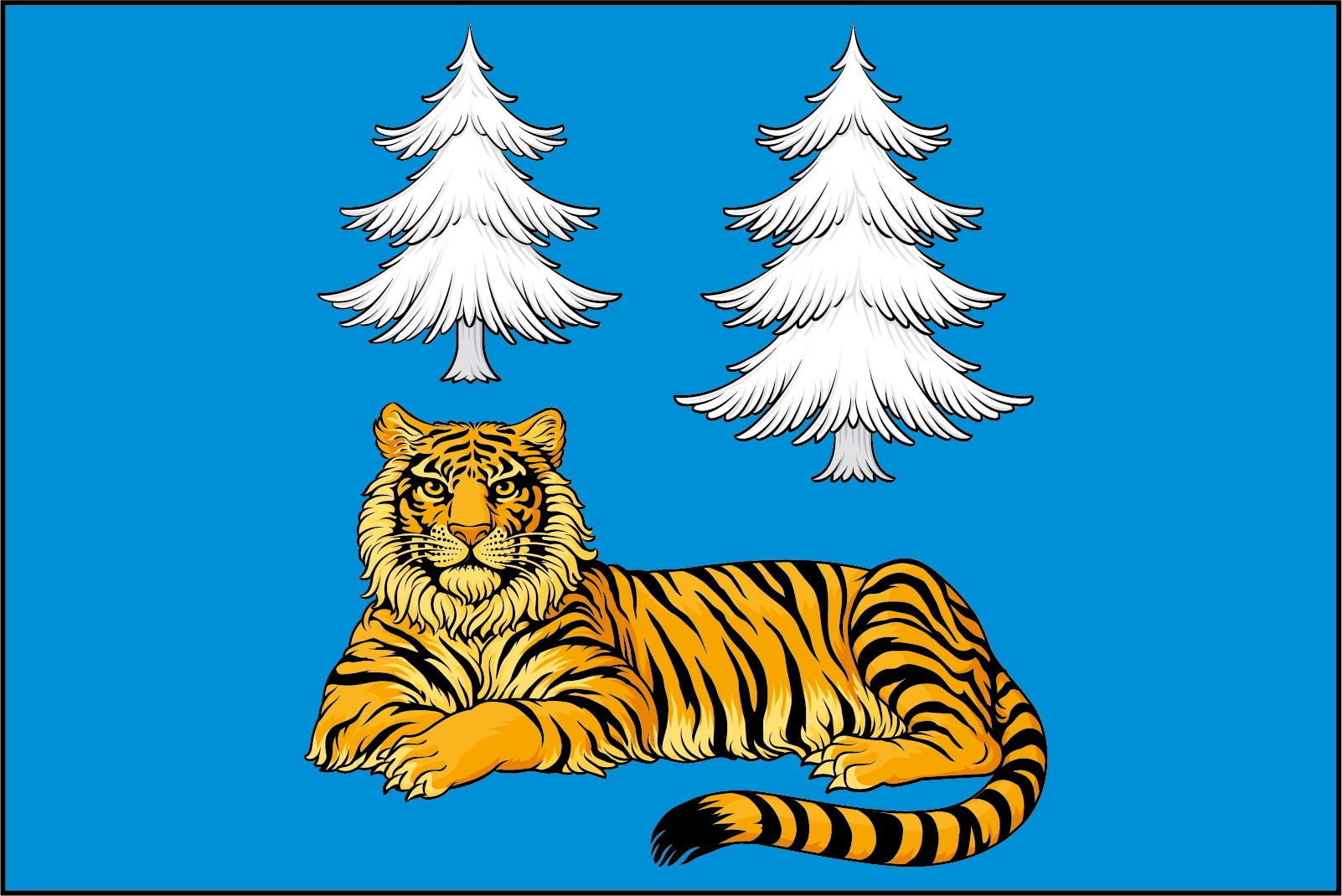
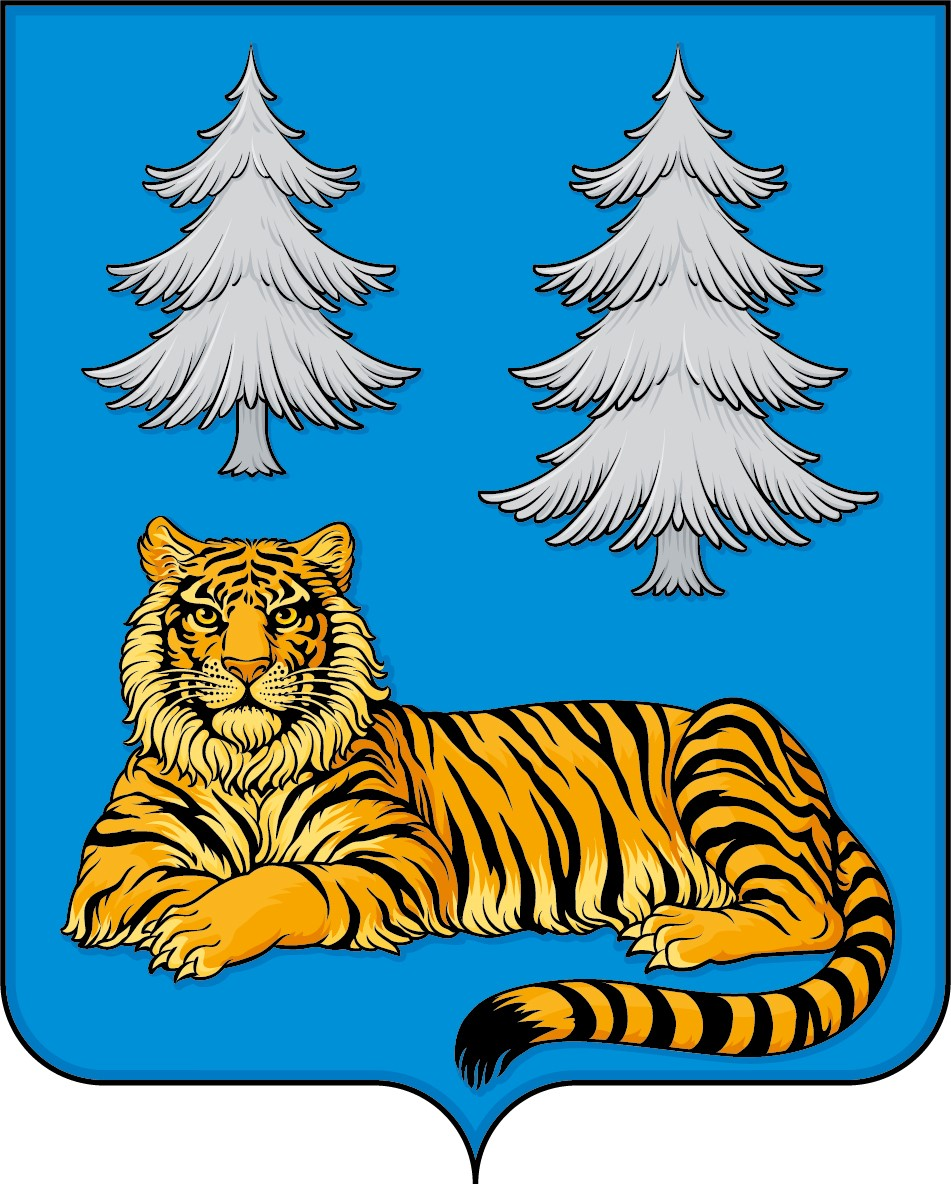
- Flag Coat of arms
- Location of Terneysky District in Primorsky Krai
- Coordinates: 46°00′N 137°30′E
- Country: Russia
- Federal subject: Primorsky Krai
- Administrative center: Terney

Area
  - Total: 27,102.2 km^{2} (10,464.2 sq mi)

Population (2010 Census)
  - Total: 12,468
  - Density: 0.46004/km^{2} (1.1915/sq mi)
  - Urban: 79.1%
  - Rural: 20.9%

Administrative structure
  - Inhabited localities: 3 urban-type settlements, 8 rural localities

Municipal structure
  - Municipally incorporated as: Terneysky Municipal District
  - Municipal divisions: 3 urban settlements, 7 rural settlements
- Time zone: UTC+10 (MSK+7)
- OKTMO ID: 05640000
- Website: http://mo.primorsky.ru/terneisky/

Terneysky District (Russian: Терне́йский райо́н) is an administrative and municipal district (raion), one of the twenty-two in Primorsky Krai, Russia. It is located in the north of the krai and borders with Khabarovsk Krai in the north, the Sea of Japan in the east and southeast, the territory of Dalnegorsk Town Under Krai Jurisdiction in the southwest, and with Krasnoarmeysky and Pozharsky Districts in the west. The area of the district is 27,102.2 square kilometers (10,464.2 sq mi). Its administrative center is the urban locality (an urban-type settlement) of Terney. Population: 12,468 (2010 census); 14,487 (2002 census); 15,273 (1989 Soviet census). The population of Terney accounts for 28.8% of the district's total population.

== Geography ==
Terneysky District is the largest district of the krai in terms of area and the smallest by population. Most of the district's territory is covered with forests which are the district's main riches. Most of the Sikhote-Alin Nature Reserve is located in Terneysky District.

== Economy ==
The industry is represented by the timber processing enterprises and the fish processing factory in Svetlaya.

== Tourism ==
There are springs of thermal radon waters in the district (Amginskoye Deposit). The Tyoply Klyuch Health Resort operates near these springs.
