= Rudny, Primorsky Krai =

Rural locality in Kavalerovsky District, Primorsky Krai, Russia

Coordinates: 44°16′N 134°57.5′E

Rudny (Russian: Ру́дный) is a rural locality (a settlement) in Kavalerovsky District of Primorsky Krai, Russia. Population: 2,373 (2010 census); 2,630 (2002 census); 3,897 (1989 Soviet census).

== History ==
It was founded in the 1940s and was granted urban-type settlement status in 1945. It was demoted in status to that of a rural locality in December 2011.

== Economy ==
The economy is based on plumbum-zinc ores mining and timber industry.
