= Slavyanka, Primorsky Krai =

Slavyanka Славянка
- Urban-type settlement
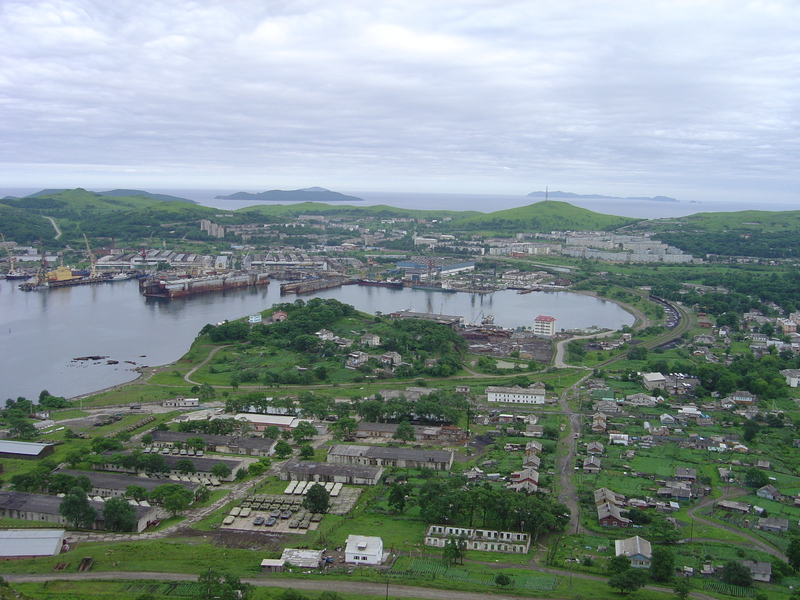
- View of Slavyanka
- Interactive map of Slavyanka
- Location of Slavyanka Slavyanka (Primorsky Krai)
- Coordinates: 42°52′N 131°23′E
- Country: Russia
- Federal subject: Primorsky Krai
- Administrative district: Khasansky District
- Founded: 1889
- Urban-type settlement status since: 1943
- Elevation: 4 m (13 ft)

Population (2010 Census)
  - Total: 14,036
  - Estimate (2023): 10,627 (−24.3%)

Administrative status
  - Capital of: Khasansky District
- Time zone: UTC+10 (MSK+7)
- Postal code: 692701
- Dialing code: +7 42331
- OKTMO ID: 05648151051

Slavyanka (Russian: Славя́нка) is an urban locality (an urban-type settlement) and the administrative center of Khasansky District of Primorsky Krai, Russia, located on the opposite side of the Amur Bay as seen from Vladivostok. Population: 14,036 (2010 census); 15,045 (2002 census); 17,325 (1989 Soviet census).

== History ==
Slavyanka was founded during the settlement of the coast of southern Primorye in the 1850s–1860s, when the Russian government sought to gain a foothold in the region. The signing of the Treaty of Aigun in 1858 and of the Treaty of Beijing in 1860 established the border between Russia and China along the Ussuri River across Lake Khanka.

The bay on which Slavyanka stands was shown in the English charts under the name of Port Bruce; other sources also referred to it as Bruce Harbor or Bruce Bay. Slavyanka itself was founded in 1889. On January 4, 1926, Slavyansky Selsoviet within Posyetsky District was established, of which Slavyanka became the administrative center. On April 29, 1943, Slavyanka was granted urban-type settlement status.

The intensive development of Slavyanka started in the 1970s, when a shipyard was built here.

== Transportation ==
The settlement is connected with Vladivostok by road, by railway, and by sea.
