= Kavalerovsky District =

Kavalerovsky District Кавалеровский район (Russian)
- District
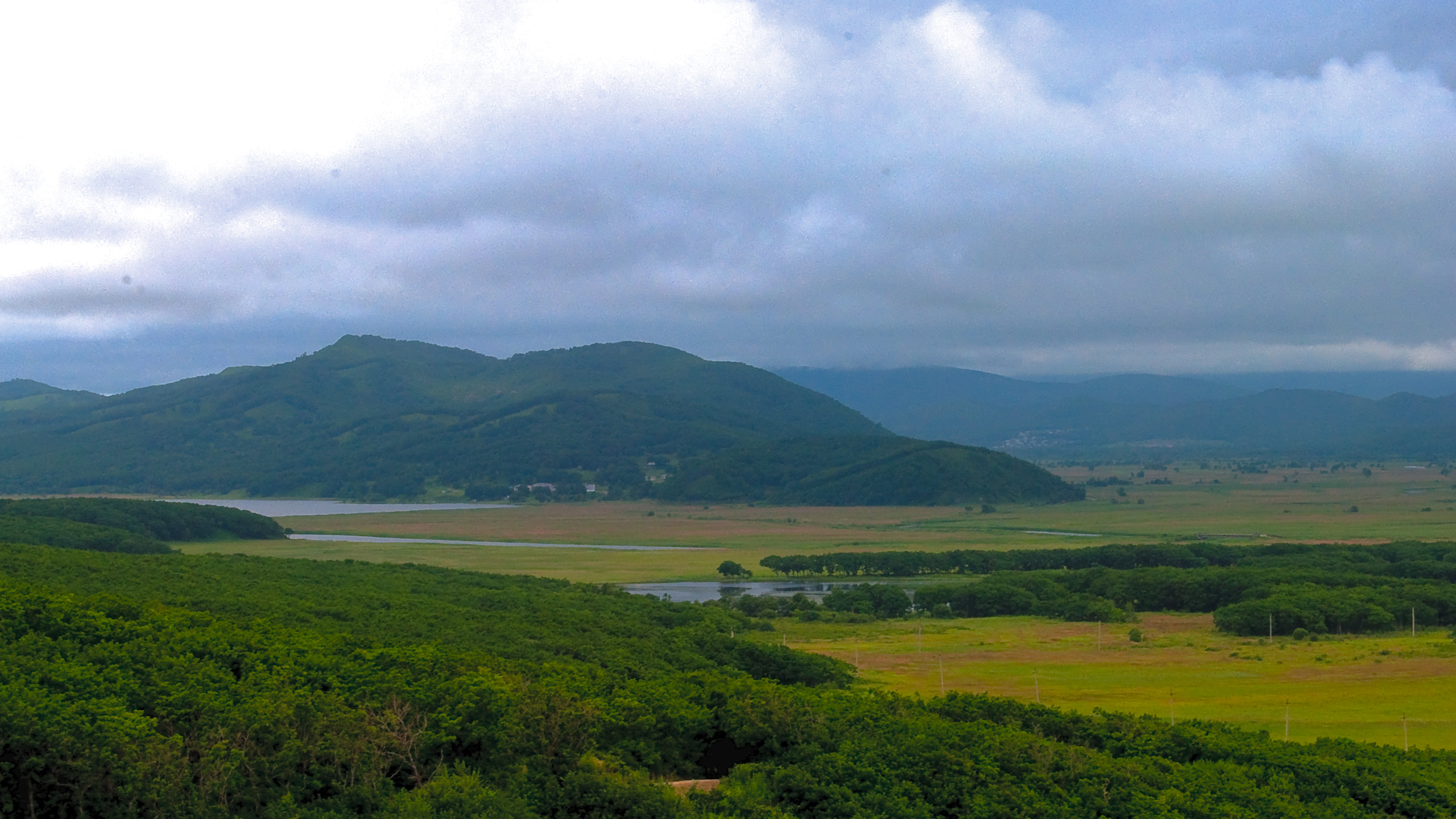
- Lake Zerkalnoye, a protected area of Russia in Kavalerovsky District

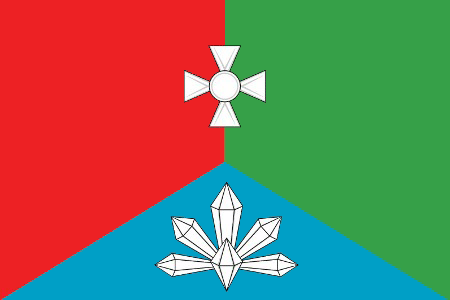
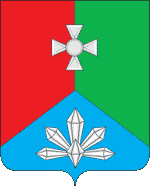
- Flag Coat of arms
- Location of Kavalerovsky District in Primorsky Krai
- Coordinates: 44°16′N 135°03′E
- Country: Russia
- Federal subject: Primorsky Krai
- Established: June 3, 1954
- Administrative center: Kavalerovo

Area
  - Total: 4,215.2 km^{2} (1,627.5 sq mi)

Population (2010 Census)
  - Total: 25,833
  - Density: 6.1285/km^{2} (15.873/sq mi)
  - Urban: 94.3%
  - Rural: 5.7%

Administrative structure
  - Inhabited localities: 3 urban-type settlements, 7 rural localities

Municipal structure
  - Municipally incorporated as: Kavalerovsky Municipal District
  - Municipal divisions: 1 urban settlements, 1 rural settlements
- Time zone: UTC+10 (MSK+7)
- OKTMO ID: 05610000
- Website: http://kavalerovsky.ru

Kavalerovsky District (Russian: Кавале́ровский райо́н) is an administrative and municipal district (raion), one of the twenty-two in Primorsky Krai, Russia. It is located in the central western portion of the krai and borders with the territory of Dalnegorsk Town Under Krai Jurisdiction in the north and northeast, the Sea of Japan in the east, Olginsky District in the south, and with Chuguyevsky District in the west. The area of the district is 4,215.2 square kilometers (1,627.5 sq mi). Its administrative center is the urban locality (an urban-type settlement) of Kavalerovo. Population: 25,833 (2010 census); 29,488 (2002 census); 36,085 (1989 Soviet census). The population of Kavalerovo accounts for 59.5% of the district's total population.

== Geography ==
Forests cover 80% of the district's territory. Fauna is represented by such rare species as the Siberian tiger, snow leopard, deer, and the Amur wild cat.

== History ==
The district was established on June 3, 1954 when it was split from Tetyukhinsky District.

== Economy ==
Kavalerovsky District is one of the krai's main tin mining regions. There are also deposits of lead and zinc ores, brown coal, gold dust, and boric raw materials. A number of large enterprises are located in the district, such as the Khrustalnaya Mining Company which specializes in tin mining; JSC Apeks, which is a gold mining enterprise; and JSC Zenit, which specializes in brown coal mining. There are also forestry enterprises engaged in lumber cutting and sawtimber production. Agriculture is not well developed.

== Tourism ==
The mountainous landscape, rich flora and fauna including pristine pine forests, fresh air, and pure water make this district attractive for tourism and recreation activities.
