= Dalnegorsk =

Town in Primorsky Krai, Russia

Dalnegorsk Дальнегорск
- Town
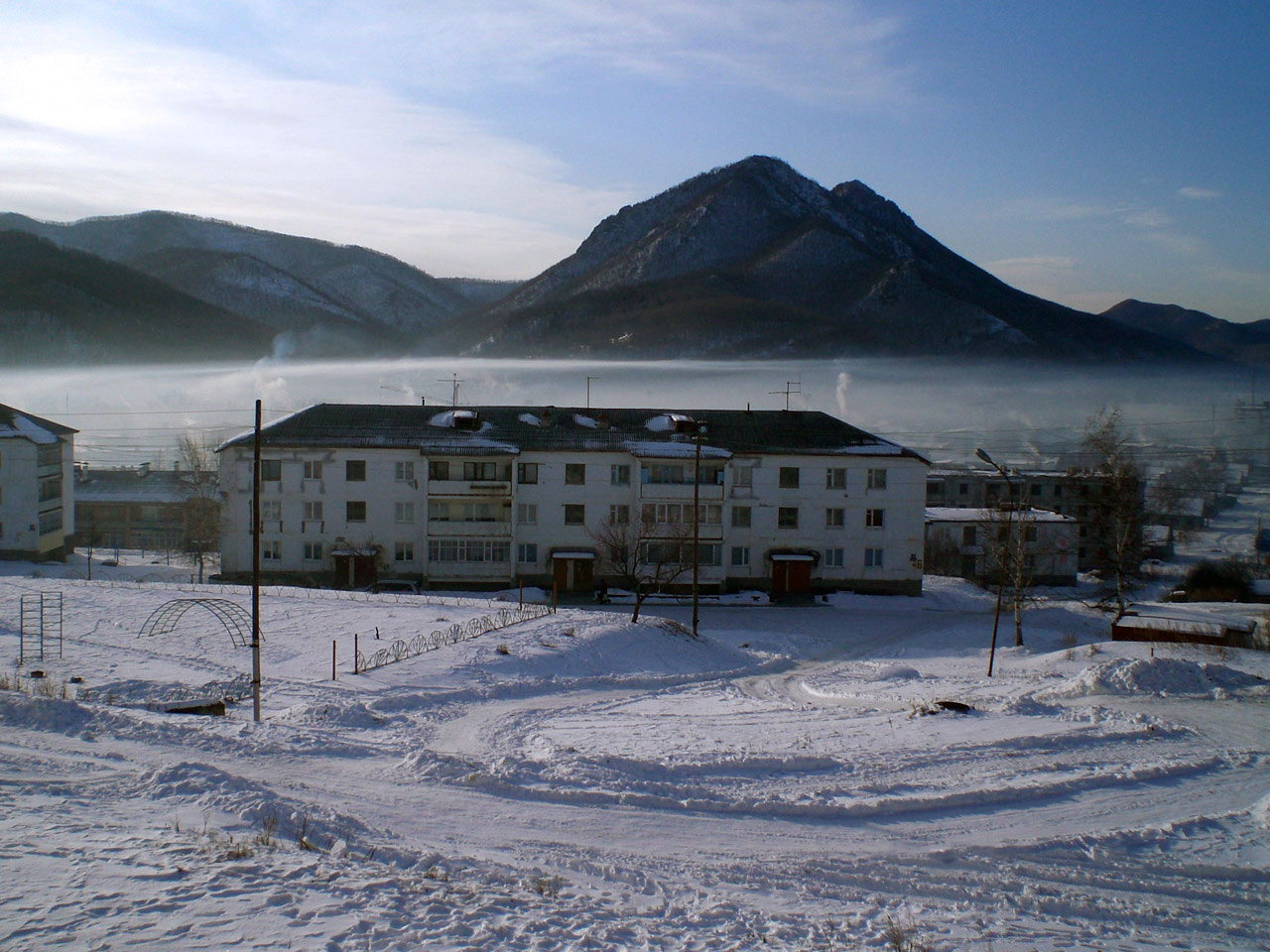
- Goreloye Microdistrict in Dalnegorsk

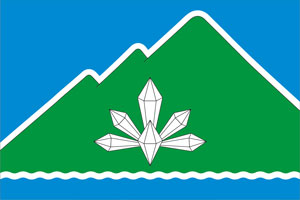
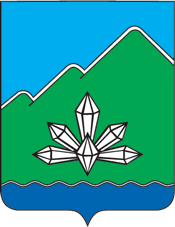
- Flag Coat of arms
- Interactive map of Dalnegorsk
- Location of Dalnegorsk Dalnegorsk (Primorsky Krai)
- Coordinates: 44°33′N 135°35′E
- Country: Russia
- Federal subject: Primorsky Krai
- Founded: 1897
- Town status since: August 31, 1989

Government
  - Mayor: Igor Sakhuta
- Elevation: 220 m (720 ft)

Population (2010 Census)
  - Total: 37,519
  - Estimate (2025): 32,310 (−13.9%)

Administrative status
  - Subordinated to: Dalnegorsk Town Under Krai Jurisdiction
  - Capital of: Dalnegorsk Town Under Krai Jurisdiction

Municipal status
  - Urban okrug: Dalnegorsky Urban Okrug
  - Capital of: Dalnegorsky Urban Okrug
- Time zone: UTC+10 (MSK+7)
- Postal codes: 692441–692443, 692446, 692448
- Dialing code: +7 42373
- OKTMO ID: 05707000001
- Website: web.archive.org/web/20140929162410/http://dalnegorsk-mo.ru/in/md/main

Dalnegorsk (Russian: Дальнего́рск, lit. far in the mountains) is a town in Primorsky Krai, Russia. Population: 37,519 (2010 census); 40,069 (2002 census); 49,792 (1989 Soviet census).

== Name ==
It was formerly known from its founding in 1897 as Tetyukhe (Russian: Те́тюхе; Chinese: 野豬河; pinyin: Yězhūhé; literally meaning "river of wild boars"), until it was renamed in 1973 as part of a campaign to change any Chinese-derived place names in Primorsky Krai.

== History ==
The settlement of Tetyukhe was founded in 1897, with the founding of a lead and zinc mine by Swiss immigrant Julius Brynner. Brynner's son Boris maintained the right to mine on the site until 1931, one of the longest-running private enterprises in the Soviet Union. Boris Brynner's son Yul Brynner later became a famous actor in the United States.

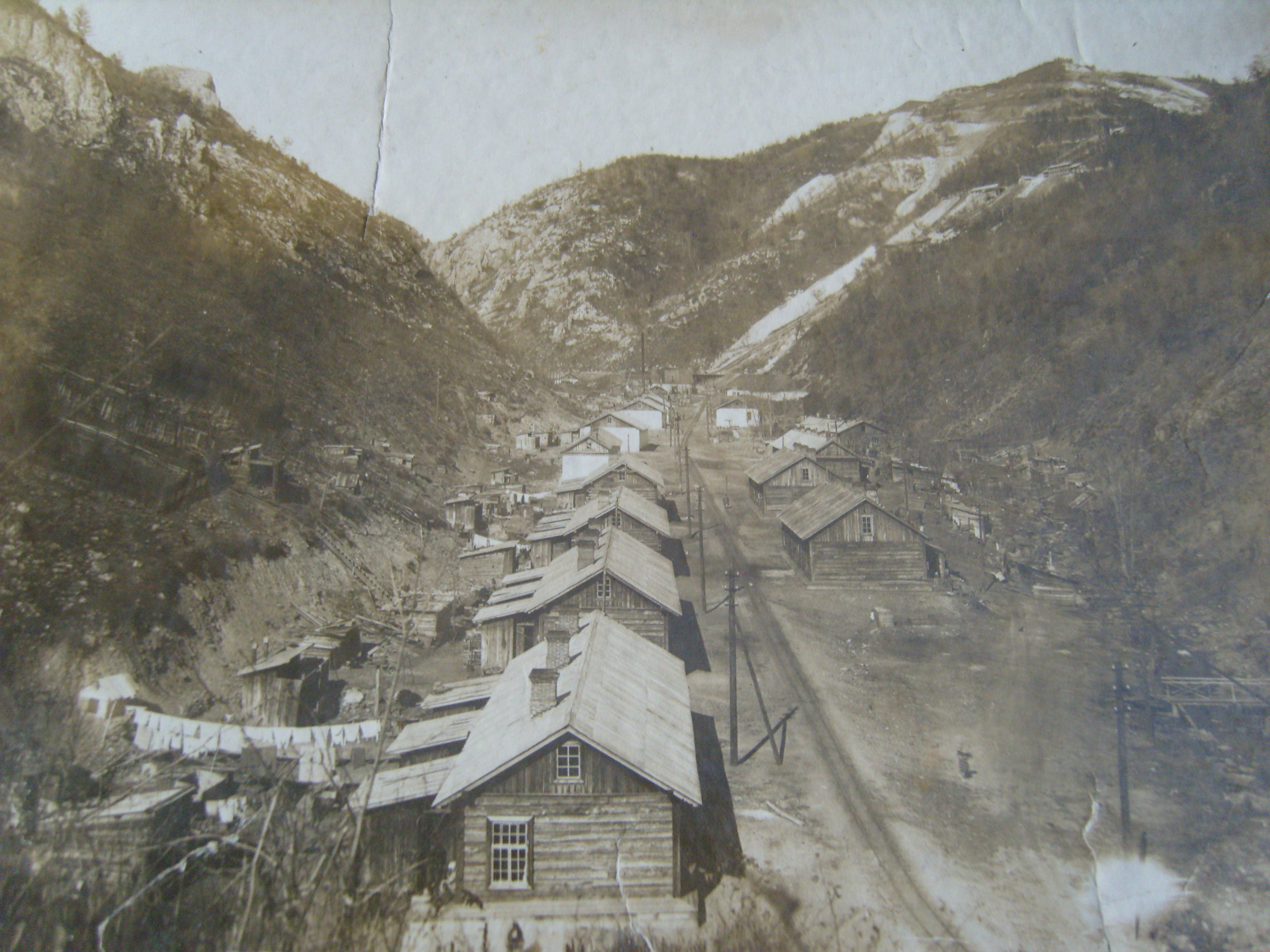
Tetyukhe in 1934

In 1930, Tetyukhe was granted urban-type settlement status. The settlement was renamed in 1973, along with the Tetyukhe River which was renamed Rudnaya, from the Russian word "руда" meaning "ore". Town status was granted to Dalnegorsk on August 31, 1989.

== Administrative and municipal status ==
Within the framework of administrative divisions, it is, together with seven rural localities, incorporated as Dalnegorsk Town Under Krai Jurisdiction—an administrative unit with the status equal to that of the districts. As a municipal division, Dalnegorsk Town Under Krai Jurisdiction is incorporated as Dalnegorsky Urban Okrug.

== Economy ==
Most population of the town is employed by two industrial enterprises: JSC Bor and JSC Dalpolimetal.

Established in 1965, Bor is the world's largest specialized chemical enterprise. Due to the unique deposits of commercial minerals found in the district, and the high technologies applied, Bor successfully operates in the world market and is included in the list of Russia's forty most prospective enterprises. Three-quarters of its production is exported to the United Kingdom, Italy, France, Japan, Australia, South Korea, China, and other countries in Europe and Asia.

Dalpolimetal, established in 1897, produces 58% of Russia's lead. Two-thirds of its production is exported to Japan, China, and South Korea.

Despite the highly developed industrialization of Dalnegorsk, over 90% of the territory under its jurisdiction is covered with Korean Pine and mixed broadleaf forests, both of which attract nature tourism enthusiasts. However, Dalnegorsk residents suffer from serious lead poisoning from an old lead smelter and the unsafe transport of lead concentrate from the local lead mining site. This led the Blacksmith Institute to declare Dalnegorsk and neighboring Rudnaya Pristan in the top ten of worst polluted places on earth. However, according to Anatoly Lebedev, leader of the ecological NGO BROK, this inclusion is questionable.

=== Transportation ===
Dalnegorsk is connected by road to Vladivostok (517 km). The nearest railway station (in Chuguyevka) is located 198 kilometers (123 mi) from Dalnegorsk. The nearest sea port is 35 kilometers (22 mi) from the town at Rudnaya Pristan.

== Politics ==
On October 19, 2006, three days before the elections, Dmitry Fotyanov, the mayoral candidate from the United Russia party who came second in the initial round of elections, was gunned down from fire of a Kalashnikov assault rifle fire. The weapons were located by the police in a minivan that was blown up near the offices of the local newspaper soon after the murder. The run-off election was called off as both remaining candidates agreed to stand down. The United Russia party called Fotyanov's death a "political murder".

== See also ==
- Chertovy Vorota Cave

== Notable residents ==
- Yuriy Shatalov (born 1963), football player and coach
- Daniil Yarusov (born 2001), football player
