= Khasansky District =

Khasansky District Хасанский район (Russian)
- District
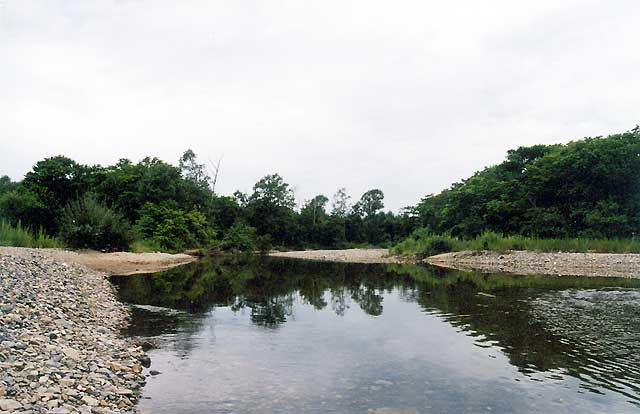
- The Poyma River in Khasansky District

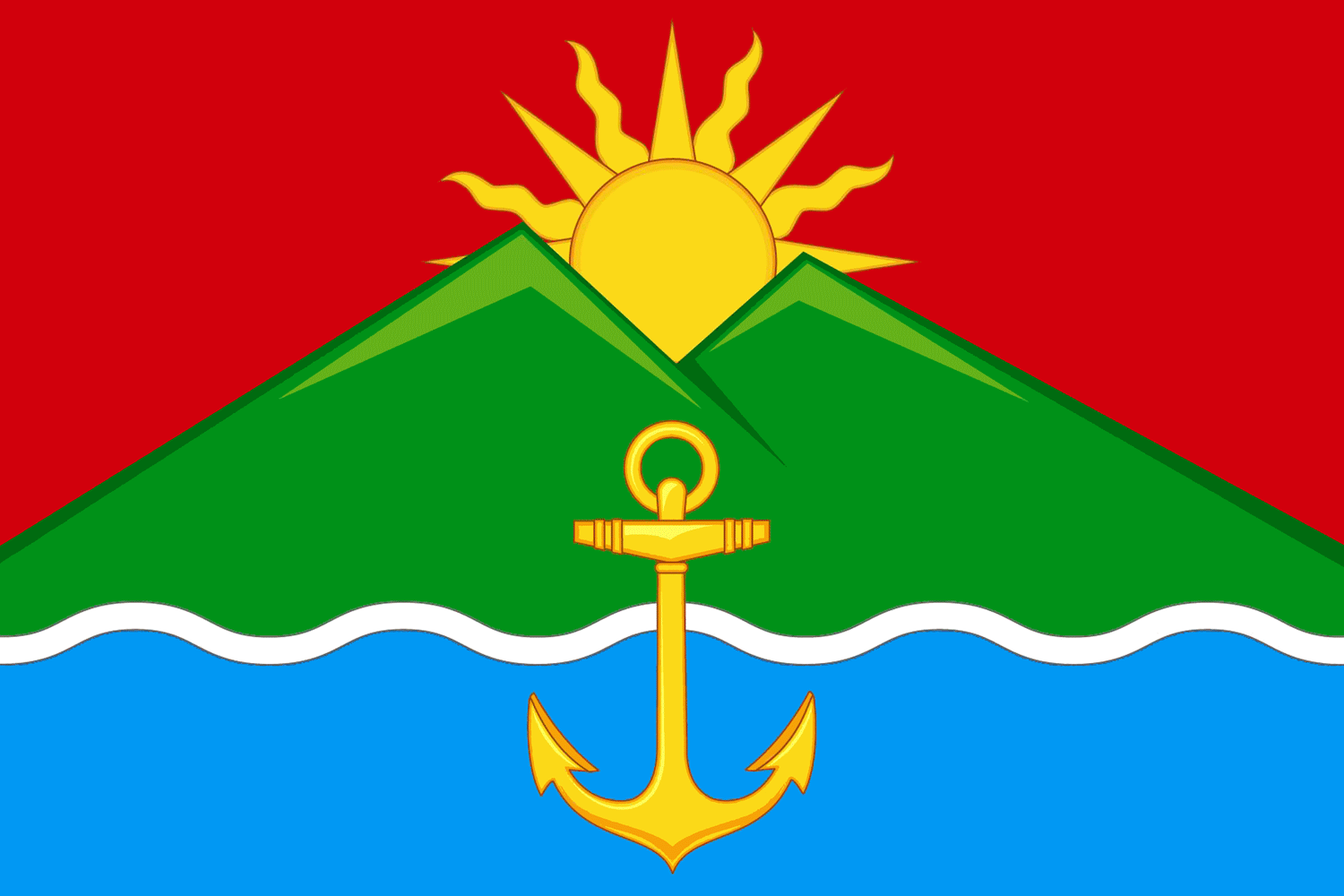
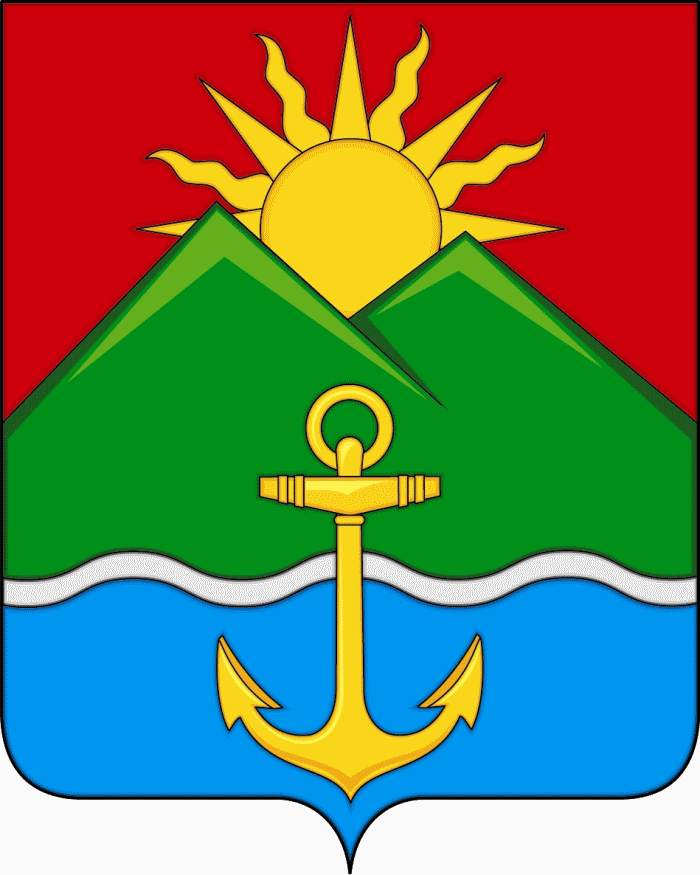
- Flag Coat of arms
- Location of Khasansky District in Primorsky Krai
- Coordinates: 42°51′56″N 131°23′07″E
- Country: Russia
- Federal subject: Primorsky Krai
- Established: 6 November 1922
- Administrative center: Slavyanka

Area
  - Total: 4,130.0 km^{2} (1,594.6 sq mi)

Population (2010 Census)
  - Total: 35,541
  - Density: 8.6056/km^{2} (22.288/sq mi)
  - Urban: 70.5%
  - Rural: 29.5%

Administrative structure
  - Inhabited localities: 6 urban-type settlements, 31 rural localities

Municipal structure
  - Municipally incorporated as: Khasansky Municipal District
  - Municipal divisions: 6 urban settlements, 2 rural settlements
- Time zone: UTC+10 (MSK+7)
- OKTMO ID: 05648000
- Website: http://mo.primorsky.ru/hasansky/

Khasansky District (Russian: Хаса́нский райо́н) is an administrative and municipal district (raion), one of the twenty-two in Primorsky Krai, Russia. It is located in the southwest of the krai, wedged between the Tumen River and the Peter the Great Gulf, and shares a border with both China and North Korea. The area of the district is 4,130.0 square kilometers (1,594.6 sq mi). Its administrative center is the urban locality (an urban-type settlement) of Slavyanka. Population: 35,541 (2010 census); 37,459 (2002 census); 43,709 (1989 Soviet census). The population of Slavyanka accounts for 39.5% of the district's total population.

== Nature ==
A significant part of the area is protected by the laws of Russia. The nature reserves include Kedrovaya Pad, established to protect the rare animals of South Primorye such as the Amur leopard, Siberian tiger, and Siberian Musk Deer; and the Far Eastern Marine Nature Reserve (1978), protecting the underwater world of the Peter the Great Gulf, including more than two thousand species of invertebrate animals (such as sea cucumber), approximately three hundred fish species, and larga seals.

== Economy ==
Fishery and ship repair dominate the district's economy. Mariculture development, medical sanitary bases establishment, and high class tourism development are considered to have potential here. Agriculture is specialized in breeding of animals for furs.

There are deposits of precious metals and construction sand, and Gusevskoye Deposit of porcelain stone which is used by the Porcelain of Primorye Works in the district.

There are several sea ports: Posyet, Zarubino, and Slavyanka, with transport passages to China and North Korea. The urban-type settlement of Khasan near Lake Khasan has a border crossing between Russia and North Korea and the Russia dprk friendship bridge.

== Partnership ==
- Sokcho, South Korea

== See also ==
- Noktundo: Former Korean island that was transferred to the Russian side, now administered by the Khasansky District since 1990.
