= Arsenyev constituency =

Russian legislative constituency

Arsenyev single-member constituency
- Constituency of the Russian State Duma

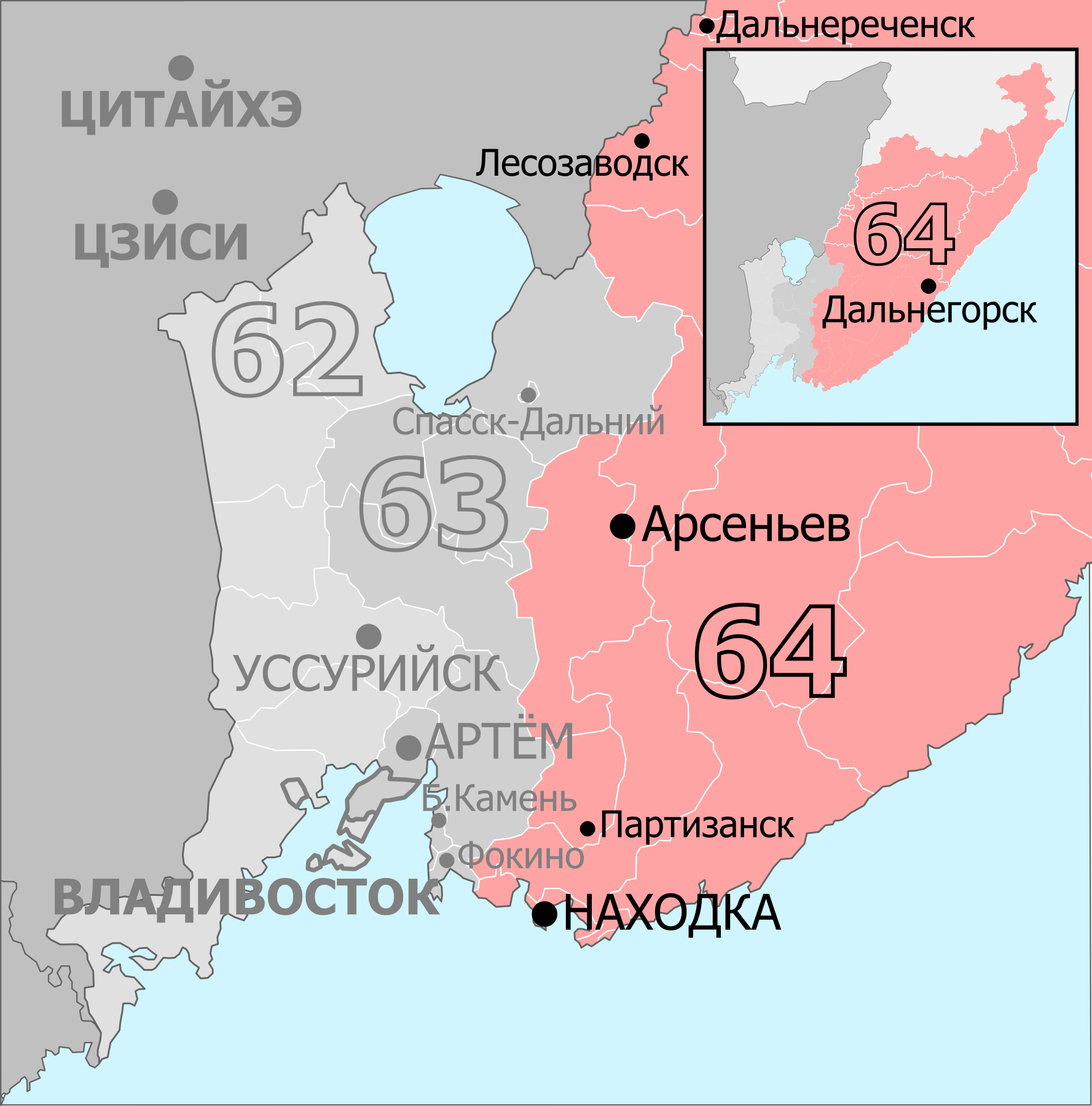
- Constituency boundaries since 2016
- Deputy: Kirill Tikhonovich; United Russia
- Federal subject: Primorsky Krai
- Districts: Anuchinsky, Arsenyev, Chuguyevsky, Dalnegorsk, Dalnerechensk, Dalnerechensky, Kavalerovsky, Kirovsky, Krasnoarmeysky, Lazovsky, Lesozavodsk, Nakhodka, Olginsky, Partizansk, Partizansky, Pozharsky, Terneysky, Yakovlevsky
- Voters: 425,439 (2026)

The Arsenyev constituency (No.68 (Note: No. 50 in 1993-1995, No. 49 in 1995-2003, No. 51 in 2003-2007, No.64 in 2016–2026)) is a Russian legislative constituency in Primorsky Krai. The constituency covers sparsely populated northern 3/4 of Primorsky Krai and a major port of Nakhodka.

The constituency has been represented since 2026 by United Russia deputy Kirill Tikhonovich, retired Russian Army officer, who won the open seat, succeeding two-term United Russia incumbent Victoria Nikolaeva.

== Boundaries ==
1993–1995: Anuchinsky District, Arsenyev, Chernigovsky District, Chuguyevsky District, Dalnegorsk, Dalnegorsky District, Dalnerechensk, Dalnerechensky District, Kavalerovsky District, Khankaysky District, Khorolsky District, Kirovsky District, Krasnoarmeysky District, Lesozavodsk, Lesozavodsky District, Mikhaylovsky District, Olginsky District, Pogranichny District, Pozharsky District, Spassk-Dalny, Spassky District, Terneysky District, Yakovlevsky District
The constituency covered all of northern Primorsky Krai, which comprised three fourth of the entire krai territory, including the towns of Arsenyev, Dalnegorsk, Dalnerechensk, Lesozavodsk and Spassk-Dalny.

1995–2007: Anuchinsky District, Arsenyev, Chernigovsky District, Chuguyevsky District, Dalnegorsk, Dalnegorsky District, Dalnerechensk, Dalnerechensky District, Kavalerovsky District, Khankaysky District, Khorolsky District, Kirovsky District, Krasnoarmeysky District, Lesozavodsk, Lesozavodsky District, Oktyabrsky District, Olginsky District, Pogranichny District, Pozharsky District, Spassk-Dalny, Spassky District, Terneysky District, Yakovlevsky District After 1995 redistricting the constituency changed insignificantly, swapping Mikhaylovsky District for Oktyabrsky District with Ussuriysk constituency.

2016–present: Anuchinsky District, Arsenyev, Chuguyevsky District, Dalnegorsk, Dalnerechensk, Dalnerechensky District, Kavalerovsky District, Kirovsky District, Krasnoarmeysky District, Lazovsky District, Lesozavodsk, Nakhodka, Olginsky District, Partizansk, Partizansky District, Pozharsky District, Terneysky District, Yakovlevsky District
The constituency was re-created for the 2016 election and it retained most of its former territory in northern Primorsky Krai, losing its western side on the shore of the Lake Khanka to Vladivostok constituency, and Spassk-Dalny and Khorol to Artyom constituency. This seat instead gained Partizansk, Nakhodka and surrounding areas in southern Primorsky Krai from the dissolved Ussuriysk constituency.

== Members elected ==
Election	Member	Party
1993	Valery Nesterenko	Independent
1995	Svetlana Orlova	Women of Russia
1999	Vladimir Grishukov	Communist Party
2003	Vasily Usoltsev	United Russia
2007	Proportional representation - no election by constituency	
2011	Proportional representation - no election by constituency	
2016	Victoria Nikolaeva	United Russia
2021	Victoria Nikolaeva	United Russia
2026	Kirill Tikhonovich	United Russia

== Election results ==
=== 1993 ===
Summary of the 12 December 1993 Russian legislative election in the Arsenyev constituency
Candidate	Party	Votes	%
Valery Nesterenko	Independent	59,164	20.16%
Azat Yusupov	Independent	–	20.00%
Eduard Gurchenkov	Independent	–	–
Leonid Mazur	Democratic Party	–	–
Vladimir Shapnevsky	Independent	–	–
Total		293,439	100%

=== 1995 ===
Summary of the 17 December 1995 Russian legislative election in the Arsenyev constituency
Candidate	Party	Votes	%
Svetlana Orlova	Women of Russia	86,947	25.13%
Vladimir Grishukov	Communist Party	60,052	17.36%
Valery Novikov	Liberal Democratic Party	27,733	8.02%
Aleksandr Sandler	Independent	19,681	5.69%
Aleksandr Tretyakov	Independent	19,023	5.50%
Valery Nesterenko (incumbent)	Stable Russia	18,317	5.29%
Aleksey Pinchuk	Agrarian Party	17,831	5.15%
Mikhail Krapivko	Communists and Working Russia - for the Soviet Union	10,909	3.15%
Aleksandr Savchenko	Independent	10,022	2.90%
Yury Kolinko	Independent	8,340	2.41%
Viktor Korochin	Independent	8,118	2.35%
Alla Omelyuk	Block of Djuna	6,084	1.76%
Yan Bystrov	Russian Lawyers' Association	4,702	1.36%
Aleksandr Vladislavlev	Forward, Russia!	4,453	1.29%
against all		36,825	10.64%
Total		345,958	100%

=== 1999 ===
Summary of the 19 December 1999 Russian legislative election in the Arsenyev constituency
Candidate	Party	Votes	%
Vladimir Grishukov	Communist Party	80,783	25.02%
Yury Serebryakov	Independent	79,793	24.71%
Yevgeny Bolshakov	Independent	31,024	9.61%
Sergey Plevako	Independent	22,956	7.11%
Vladimir Petrov	Liberal Democratic Party	9,001	2.79%
Grigory Pravda	Independent	7,914	2.45%
Aleksandr Sivash	Independent	7,845	2.43%
Yury Korsakov	Andrey Nikolayev and Svyatoslav Fyodorov Bloc	7,805	2.42%
Sergey Loktionov	Independent	7,108	2.20%
Sergey Samodumsky	Yabloko	7,079	2.19%
against all		52,010	16.11%
Total		322,895	100%

=== 2003 ===
Summary of the 7 December 2003 Russian legislative election in the Arsenyev constituency
Candidate	Party	Votes	%
Vasily Usoltsev	United Russia	116,377	44.95%
Vladimir Grishukov (incumbent)	Communist Party	55,536	21.45%
Sergey Plevako	Party of Russia's Rebirth-Russian Party of Life	20,550	7.94%
Sergey Gavrikov	Liberal Democratic Party	19,159	7.40%
Tatyana Romanenko	Union of Right Forces	9,592	3.70%
against all		33,238	12.84%
Total		259,044	100%

=== 2016 ===
Summary of the 18 September 2016 Russian legislative election in the Arsenyev constituency
Candidate	Party	Votes	%
Victoria Nikolaeva	United Russia	71,190	37.46%
Vladimir Grishukov	Communist Party	41,572	21.88%
Yevgeny Zotov	Liberal Democratic Party	30,778	16.20%
Valery Mishkin	A Just Russia	13,825	7.28%
Dmitry Frolov	Communists of Russia	8,920	4.69%
Pavel Sulyandziga	Yabloko	5,814	3.06%
Grigory Zhurlov	Rodina	5,049	2.66%
Total		190,023	100%

=== 2021 ===
Summary of the 17-19 September 2021 Russian legislative election in the Arsenyev constituency
Candidate	Party	Votes	%
Victoria Nikolaeva (incumbent)	United Russia	65,922	33.04%
Anatoly Yelishov	Communist Party	51,049	25.59%
Vasily Vasilyev	Liberal Democratic Party	14,041	7.04%
Yevgenia Zavarzina	A Just Russia — For Truth	13,367	6.70%
Anna Somova	Party of Pensioners	12,088	6.06%
Sergey Kushchakovsky	New People	8,982	4.50%
Lira Ivliyeva	Russian Party of Freedom and Justice	5,981	3.00%
Andrey Karpov	The Greens	5,306	2.66%
Marina Zheleznyakova	Yabloko	3,800	1.90%
Yevgeny Shkarupa	Party of Growth	3,648	1.83%
Sergey Milvit	Rodina	1,854	0.93%
Total		199,504	100%

=== 2026 ===
Summary of the 18-20 September 2026 Russian legislative election in the Arsenyev constituency
Candidate	Party	Votes	%
Kirill Tikhonovich	United Russia	156,968	56.72%
Vyacheslav Gnezdilov	Liberal Democratic Party	33,560	12.13%
Aleksandr Sorokin	Communist Party	26,412	9.54%
Dmitry Komarov	New People	25,296	9.14%
Nikolay Vasyutkin	A Just Russia	15,782	5.70%
Yevgeny Pankov	Party of Pensioners	12,129	4.38%
Total		276,732	100%
