= Flag of Primorsky Krai =

Flag of the Russian krai of Primorsky

Primorsky Krai
- Proportion: 2:3
- Adopted: 22 February 1995
- Design: A rectangular panel, divided diagonally by a white stripe and consisting of red and blue triangles with a Ussuri tiger in the red triangle.
- Designed by: W. A. Obertas

The flag of Primorsky Krai is a rectangular panel, divided diagonally by a white stripe and consisting of two triangles: the top one, placed at the flagpole, red and the bottom blue. In the upper corner near the shaft there is a golden image of a Ussuri tiger walking. The ratio of the width of the flag to its length is 2:3. The width of the white stripe on the shaft shall be one fifth of the entire width of the flag; the height of the tiger figure should be one fourth of the width of the flag on the pole. It is a representative, identification and legal mark, drawn up and used in accordance with the rules of vexillology. The idea of the flag was proposed by V. A. Obertas, a professor at the Institute of Architecture, FESTU.

The colours of the flag symbolize:

- Red – the colour of deeds, sacrifice, victory, celebration, a symbol of courage, courage and fearlessness. These qualities residents and warriors of the Primorsky Krai have repeatedly shown in the most different periods of the existence of Primorye.
- Blue – the colour of honesty, loyalty to duty, a symbol of beauty, gentleness, grandeur. These qualities are also inherent in the Primorye and the unique nature of the region. In addition, the blue color also symbolizes the sea, with which the life and fate of the majority of the inhabitants of the region are connected today and forever.
- White – the colour in the form of a stripe, directed diagonally upwards, marks the movement forward to new challenges, to new heights.

All colours of the Primorsky Krai flag together symbolize the unity of the region and Russia, since the same colors are included in the national flag of the Russian Federation (without repeating it). The figure of the Ussurian tiger – the main figure of the coat of arms of the Primorsky Krai uniquely identifies the flag belonging to the Primorsky Krai.

== Other flags ==
Flag	Date	Use	Description
	2012–Present	Flag of Vladivostok	
	?–2012	Flag of Vladivostok	
	?–Present	Flag of Arsenyev	
	?–Present	Flag of Artyom	
	?–Present	Flag of Bolshoy Kamen	
	?–Present	Flag of Dalnerechensk	
	?–Present	Flag of Nakhodka	
	2006–Present	Flag of Partizansk	
	2005–2006	Flag of Partizansk	
	?–2005	Flag of Partizansk	
	?–Present	Flag of Ussuriysk	
	?–Present	Flag of Partizansk	
	2004–Present	Flag of Kavalerovsky District	
	?–2004	Flag of Kavalerovsky District	
	?–Present	Flag of Krasnoarmeysky District	
	?–Present	Flag of Lazovsky District	
	?–Present	Flag of Mikhaylovsky District	A horizontal bicolor of red and blue;
	?–Present	Flag of Nadezhdinsky District	
	?–Present	Flag of Olginsky District	
	?–Present	Flag of Pogranichny District	
	2006–Present	Flag of Pozharsky District	
	?–2006	Flag of Pozharsky District	
	?–Present	Flag of Spassky District	
	2014–Present	Flag of Khasansky District	
	?–2014	Flag of Khasansky District	
	?–Present	Flag of Khorolsky District	
	?–Present	Flag of Shkotovsky District	
	?–Present	Flag of Yakovlevsky District	
