= Ussuriysk constituency =

Former Russian legislative constituency

Ussuriysk single-member constituency
- Constituency of the Russian State Duma
- Deputy: None
- Federal subject: Primorsky Krai
- Districts: Bolshoy Kamen, Fokino, Khasansky, Lazovsky, Mikhaylovsky, Nakhodka, Nadezhdinsky, Partizansk, Partizansky, Shkotovsky, Ussuriysk, Ussuriysky
- Voters: 490,017 (2003)

The Ussuriysk constituency (No. 53 (Note: No. 52 in 1993-1995, No. 51 in 1995-2003)) was a Russian legislative constituency in Primorsky Krai in 1993-2007. It covered several major cities in southern Primorsky Krai outside of Vladivostok. The seat was last occupied by Independent deputy Svetlana Goryacheva, former Deputy Chairwoman of the Supreme Council of Russia and prosecutor, who won the open-seat race in the 1995 election.

The constituency was dissolved in 2007 when State Duma adopted full proportional representation for the next two electoral cycles. Ussuriysk constituency was not re-established for the 2016 election, currently the constituency is divided between all other Primorsky Krai districts: south-western Primorsky Krai and Ussuriysk were placed into Vladivostok constituency, Bolshoy Kamen and Fokino into Artyom constituency, and Nakhodka and Partizansk were put into Arsenyev constituency.

== Boundaries ==
1993–1995: Bolshoy Kamen, Fokino, Khasansky District, Lazovsky District, Nakhodka, Nadezhdinsky District, Oktyabrsky District, Partizansk, Partizansky District, Shkotovsky District, Ussuriysk, Ussuriysky District
The constituency covered southern Primorsky Krai as it stretched from Khasan near the border with North Korea to Ussuriysk, 98 kilometres north of Vladivostok, and then south-east to the port of Nakhodka.

1995–2007: Bolshoy Kamen, Fokino, Khasansky District, Lazovsky District, Mikhaylovsky District, Nakhodka, Nadezhdinsky District, Partizansk, Partizansky District, Shkotovsky District, Ussuriysk, Ussuriysky District
After 1995 redistricting the constituency changed insignificantly, swapping Oktyabrsky District for Mikhaylovsky District with Arsenyev constituency.

== Members elected ==
Election	Member	Party
1993	Igor Ustinov	Independent
1995	Svetlana Goryacheva	Communist Party
1999	Svetlana Goryacheva	Communist Party
2003	Svetlana Goryacheva	Independent

== Election results ==
=== 1993 ===
==== Declared candidates ====
- Mikhail Besedin (Independent), former Chairman of the Nakhodka City Council of People's Deputies (1991–1993)
- Aleksandr Kostenko (Independent), agriculture executive
- Mikhail Lusnikov (Independent), law firm partner
- Yury Shin (Independent), lawyer
- Igor Ustinov (Independent), former People's Deputy of Russia (1990–1993)

==== Results ====
Summary of the 12 December 1993 Russian legislative election in the Ussuriysk constituency
Candidate	Party	Votes	%
Igor Ustinov	Independent	73,200	29.48%
Aleksandr Kostenko	Independent	40,469	16.30%
Mikhail Besedin	Independent	31,910	12.85%
Mikhail Lusnikov	Independent	22,923	9.23%
Yury Shin	Independent	15,224	6.13%
against all		41,227	16.60%
Total		248,306	100%

=== 1995 ===
==== Declared candidates ====
- Anatoly Chernovol (VOPDT), shipping businessman
- Svetlana Goryacheva (CPRF), former People's Deputy of Russia (1990–1993), former Deputy Chairwoman of the Supreme Soviet of the Russian SFSR (1990–1991)
- Karl Isakovich (Independent), construction businessman
- Aleksandr Kostenko (Independent), agriculture executive, 1993 candidate for this seat
- Vladimir Kruglikov (Independent)
- Igor Lebedinets (Independent), Member of Duma of Primorsky Krai (1995–present), former Chairman of the Duma (1995)
- Natalya Makarova (Independent), seafood businesswoman
- Yury Malyshev (NDR), director general of Rosugol (1993–present)
- Oleg Mitusov (LDPR), property manager
- Yury Orlenko (AAR), Deputy Chief of Primorsky Krai Militsiya
- Nina Roshchina (APR), agriculture union leader
- Aleksandr Rusanov (Independent), Ussuriysk Suvorov Military School senior lecturer

==== Declined ====
- Igor Ustinov (Forward, Russia!), incumbent Member of State Duma (1994–present) (ran on the party list)

==== Results ====
Summary of the 17 December 1995 Russian legislative election in the Ussuriysk constituency
Candidate	Party	Votes	%
Svetlana Goryacheva	Communist Party	130,178	43.64%
Aleksandr Kostenko	Independent	25,647	8.60%
Yury Malyshev	Our Home – Russia	24,992	8.38%
Oleg Mitusov	Liberal Democratic Party	16,597	5.56%
Anatoly Chernovol	Political Movement of Transport Workers	12,327	4.13%
Natalya Makarova	Independent	10,218	3.43%
Yury Orlenko	Russian Lawyers' Association	9,475	3.18%
Igor Lebedinets	Independent	8,189	2.75%
Aleksandr Rusanov	Independent	8,077	2.71%
Nina Roshchina	Agrarian Party	7,229	2.42%
Karl Isakovich	Independent	3,335	1.12%
Vladimir Kruglikov	Independent	2,592	0.87%
against all		33,924	11.37%
Total		298,273	100%

=== 1999 ===
==== Declared candidates ====
- Svetlana Goryacheva (CPRF), Deputy Chairwoman of the State Duma (1996–present), incumbent Member of State Duma (1996–present)
- Aleksandr Klimenok (DN), former Commander of the 10th Russian Navy Operational Squadron (1993–1998), Russian Navy vice admiral
- Vyacheslav Oleynik (Independent), heat and power plant director
- Mikhail Pilipenko (Independent), Chairman of the Nakhodka City Duma (1999–present)
- Aleksandr Plotnikov (Independent), agriculture executive
- Valery Rozov (Independent), Member of Duma of Primorsky Krai (1999–present), retired Federal Border Service major general
- Valery Yashin (Unity), Deputy Chief of Primorsky Krai Militsiya (1987–present)

==== Did not file ====
- Nikolay Beletsky (Independent), former Deputy Mayor of Vladivostok (1998)
- Leonid Beltyukov (Independent), Member of Duma of Primorsky Krai (1997–present), journalist
- Vladimir Brezhnev (NDR), chairman of the regional chamber of commerce
- Vitaly Kubekin (Independent)
- Sergey Pechenkin (Independent)
- Sergey Pilyavets (KRO-Boldyrev)
- Viktor Potapeyko (KTR–zSS), printer
- Aleksandr Rusanov (Yabloko), Ussuriysk Suvorov Military School senior lecturer, 1995 candidate for this seat
- Aleksandr Serdyuk (RPP)
- Maria Solovyenko (Nikolayev–Fyodorov Bloc), journalist
- Sergey Zharinov (Independent), Member of Duma of Bolshoy Kamen (1999–present)

==== Results ====
Summary of the 19 December 1999 Russian legislative election in the Ussuriysk constituency
Candidate	Party	Votes	%
Svetlana Goryacheva (incumbent)	Communist Party	147,377	49.87%
Valery Yashin	Unity	41,854	14.16%
Mikhail Pilipenko	Independent	25,278	8.55%
Aleksandr Plotnikov	Independent	11,092	3.75%
Valery Rozov	Independent	9,214	3.12%
Aleksandr Klimenok	Spiritual Heritage	8,952	3.03%
Vyacheslav Oleynik	Independent	6,181	2.09%
against all		39,109	13.23%
Total		295,503	100%

=== 2003 ===
==== Declared candidates ====
- Vyacheslav Alekseyev (LDPR), Member of Mikhaylovsky District Council of Deputies (2000–present), pensioner
- Nurmet Aliyev (Independent), Member of Duma of Vladivostok (2003–present), businessman
- Sergey Fokin (ORP Rus'), nonprofit director
- Svetlana Goryacheva (Independent), incumbent Member of State Duma (1996–present), Chairwoman of the Duma Committee on Women, Family, and Youth (2000–present)
- Viktor Krivulin (Independent), Head of Khasansky District (2001–present)
- Yury Kuznetsov (APR), agriculture businessman
- Nikolay Morozov (SPS), Member of Legislative Assembly of Primorsky Krai (2002–present)
- Aleksey Samodelok (Independent), individual entrepreneur

==== Did not file ====
- Lyudmila Matveyeva (Independent), clerk
- Valery Nesterenko (NK–AR), former Member of State Duma (1994–1995)
- Tatyana Petrakovskaya (Independent), deputy chief doctor of the Primorsky Krai clinical hospital No.1
- Aleksandr Volkov (Independent), pentecostal pastor

==== Results ====
Summary of the 7 December 2003 Russian legislative election in the Ussuriysk constituency
Candidate	Party	Votes	%
Svetlana Goryacheva (incumbent)	Independent	91,736	40.99%
Viktor Krivulin	Independent	37,420	16.72%
Nurmet Aliyev	Independent	14,223	6.36%
Yury Kuznetsov	Agrarian Party	12,324	5.51%
Vyacheslav Alekseyev	Liberal Democratic Party	11,075	4.95%
Nikolay Morozov	Union of Right Forces	7,599	3.40%
Aleksey Samodelok	Independent	2,111	0.94%
Sergey Fokin	United Russian Party Rus'	2,092	0.93%
against all		40,518	18.11%
Total		224,080	100%
