= Vladivostok constituency =

Russian legislative constituency

Vladivostok single-member constituency
- Constituency of the Russian State Duma

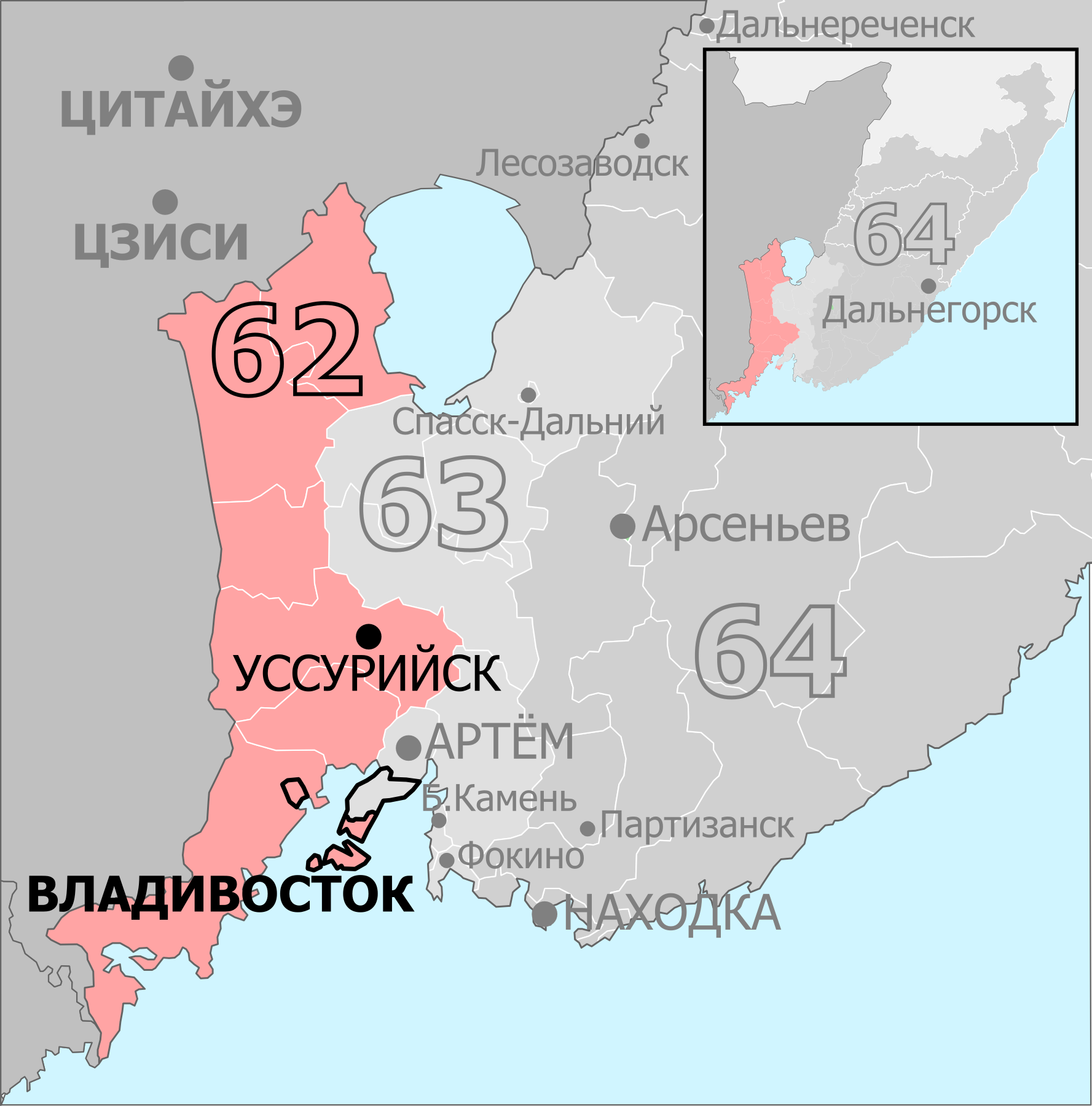
- Constituency boundaries since 2016
- Deputy: Aleksandr Shcherbakov; United Russia
- Federal subject: Primorsky Krai
- Districts: Khankaysky, Khasansky, Nadezhdinsky, Oktyabrsky, Pogranichny, Ussuriysk, Vladivostok (Frunzensky, Leninsky, Pervomaysky)
- Voters: 504,257 (2026)

The Vladivostok constituency (No.66 (Note: No.51 in 1993-1995, No.50 in 1995-2003, No.52 in 2003-2007, No.62 in 2016–2026)) is a Russian legislative constituency in Primorsky Krai. The constituency covers central Vladivostok and western Primorsky Krai.

The constituency has been represented since 2021 by United Russia deputy Aleksandr Shcherbakov, a maritime businessman, who won the open seat succeeding one-term United Russia incumbent Sergey Sopchuk.

== Boundaries ==
1993–2007: Artyom, Vladivostok
The constituency compactly covered only Vladivostok and its satellite city Artyom to the north.

2016–present: Khankaysky District, Khasansky District, Nadezhdinsky District, Oktyabrsky District, Pogranichny District, Ussuriysk, Vladivostok (Frunzensky, Leninsky, Pervomaysky)
The constituency was re-created for the 2016 election and it retained only downtown Vladivostok, losing the rest of the city and Artyom to new Artyom constituency. This seat gained southwestern Primorsky Krai from Ussuriysk to Khasan from the dissolved Ussuriysk constituency as well as rural districts to the north of Ussuriysk from Arsenyev constituency.

== Members elected ==
| Election | Member | Party |
|---|---|---|
| 1993 | Mikhail Glubokovsky | Yavlinsky–Boldyrev–Lukin |
| 1995 | Vladimir Shakhov | Independent |
| 1999 | A by-election was scheduled after Against all line received the most votes | |
| 2000 | Viktor Cherepkov | Independent |
| 2003 | Viktor Cherepkov | Independent |
| 2007 | Proportional representation - no election by constituency | |
| 2011 | Proportional representation - no election by constituency | |
| 2016 | Sergey Sopchuk | United Russia |
| 2021 | Aleksandr Shcherbakov | United Russia |
| 2026 | Aleksandr Shcherbakov | United Russia |

== Election results ==
=== 1993 ===
Summary of the 12 December 1993 Russian legislative election in the Vladivostok constituency
| Candidate | Party | Votes | % |
|---|---|---|---|
| Mikhail Glubokovsky | Yavlinsky–Boldyrev–Lukin | 50,256 | 20.90% |
| Nikolay Zolotov | Liberal Democratic Party | 25,626 | 10.60% |
| Aleksey Ryndovsky | Independent | 24,375 | 10.14% |
| Aleksandr Latkin | Democratic Party | 22,708 | 9.44% |
| Vladimir Ksenzuk | Choice of Russia | 21,689 | 9.02% |
| Mikhail Savchenko | Independent | 21,126 | 8.78% |
| against all | | 49,662 | 20.65% |
| Total | | 240,487 | 100% |

=== 1995 ===
Summary of the 17 December 1995 Russian legislative election in the Vladivostok constituency
| Candidate | Party | Votes | % |
|---|---|---|---|
| Vladimir Shakhov | Independent | 71,338 | 22.62% |
| Viktor Cherepkov | Federal Democratic Movement | 52,221 | 16.56% |
| Oleg Logunov | Independent | 41,788 | 13.25% |
| Mikhail Glubokovsky (incumbent) | Yabloko | 27,646 | 8.76% |
| Yevgeny Bolshakov | Liberal Democratic Party | 22,087 | 7.00% |
| Aleksandr Bondarenko | Independent | 20,446 | 6.48% |
| Igor Lukyanov | Independent | 15,007 | 4.76% |
| Nikolay Martynyuk | Independent | 7,971 | 2.53% |
| Vitaly Yurchenko | Communists and Working Russia - for the Soviet Union | 6,987 | 2.22% |
| Artur Korolkov | Congress of Russian Communities | 6,369 | 2.02% |
| Vladimir Khodosov | Independent | 5,186 | 1.64% |
| Vladimir Kapysh | Independent | 4,540 | 1.44% |
| Pyotr Gaponyuk | My Fatherland | 2,620 | 0.83% |
| against all | | 23,115 | 7.33% |
| Total | | 315,414 | 100% |

=== 1999 ===
A by-election was scheduled after Against all line received the most votes.

Summary of the 19 December 1999 Russian legislative election in the Vladivostok constituency
| Candidate | Party | Votes | % |
|---|---|---|---|
| Galina Dubovik | Unity | 33,225 | 11.01% |
| Vladimir Boruchenko | Movement in Support of the Army | 31,636 | 10.49% |
| Gennady Kucherenko | Independent | 29,964 | 9.93% |
| Sergey Solovyov | Independent | 28,649 | 9.50% |
| Anatoly Vasyanovich | Independent | 28,427 | 9.42% |
| Vladimir Nikiforov | Yabloko | 16,883 | 5.60% |
| Aleksandr Terentyev | Independent | 16,395 | 5.43% |
| Vitaly Bakanov | Independent | 14,666 | 4.86% |
| Vladimir Shakhov (incumbent) | Independent | 13,379 | 4.44% |
| Vasily Shirshikov | Independent | 11,713 | 3.88% |
| Anatoly Milashevich | Independent | 7,848 | 2.60% |
| Yevgeny Degtyarev | Congress of Russian Communities-Yury Boldyrev Movement | 2,160 | 0.72% |
| against all | | 56,812 | 18.83% |
| Total | | 301,662 | 100% |

=== 2000 ===
Summary of the 26 March 2000 by-election in the Vladivostok constituency
| Candidate | Party | Votes | % |
|---|---|---|---|
| Viktor Cherepkov | Independent | 86,818 | 27.02% |
| Valentina Kudryavtseva | Independent | 61,630 | 19.18% |
| Vladimir Boruchenko | Independent | 41,429 | 12.98% |
| Gennady Kucherenko | Independent | 28,255 | 8.79% |
| Sergey Solovyov | Independent | 21,110 | 6.57% |
| Vasily Shirshikov | Independent | 16,054 | 5.00% |
| Irina Tumanova | Independent | 8,155 | 2.54% |
| Vitaly Poluyanov | Independent | 5,908 | 1.84% |
| Zinovy Golovets | Independent | 2,434 | 0.76% |
| Sergey Fokin | Independent | 2,352 | 0.73% |
| Anatoly Shchebletov | Independent | 1,354 | 0.42% |
| against all | | 37,372 | 11.63% |
| Total | | 319,267 | 100% |

=== 2003 ===
Summary of the 7 December 2003 Russian legislative election in the Vladivostok constituency
| Candidate | Party | Votes | % |
|---|---|---|---|
| Viktor Cherepkov (incumbent) | Independent | 69,913 | 31.55% |
| Pavel Patsvald | Independent | 61,486 | 27.75% |
| Adam Imadayev | Independent | 26,907 | 12.14% |
| Vladimir Kuznetsov | Independent | 12,622 | 5.70% |
| Viktor Potapeyko | Communist Party | 5,980 | 2.70% |
| Nikolay Beletsky | Rodina | 5,838 | 2.63% |
| Valentin Kurayev | Liberal Democratic Party | 3,249 | 1.47% |
| Aleksandr Tishchenko | Agrarian Party | 3,053 | 1.38% |
| Anatoly Novikov | Union of Right Forces | 2,276 | 1.03% |
| Yevgeny Kolupayev | Independent | 1,767 | 0.80% |
| Valentin Labonin | Party of Russia's Rebirth-Russian Party of Life | 1,534 | 0.69% |
| against all | | 23,816 | 10.75% |
| Total | | 221,967 | 100% |

=== 2016 ===
Summary of the 18 September 2016 Russian legislative election in the Vladivostok constituency
| Candidate | Party | Votes | % |
|---|---|---|---|
| Sergey Sopchuk | United Russia | 72,367 | 39.53% |
| Anatoly Dolgachev | Communist Party | 24,851 | 13.58% |
| Andrey Andreychenko | Liberal Democratic Party | 21,498 | 11.74% |
| Aleksandr Perednya | A Just Russia | 15,034 | 8.21% |
| Viktor Cherepkov | Rodina | 14,145 | 7.73% |
| Oleg Park | Party of Growth | 12,546 | 6.85% |
| Vitaly Libanov | Communists of Russia | 7,111 | 3.88% |
| Nikolay Markovtsev | Yabloko | 6,209 | 3.39% |
| Total | | 183,052 | 100% |

=== 2021 ===
Summary of the 17-19 September 2021 Russian legislative election in the Vladivostok constituency
| Candidate | Party | Votes | % |
|---|---|---|---|
| Aleksandr Shcherbakov | United Russia | 70,057 | 34.59% |
| Artyom Samsonov | Communist Party | 45,359 | 22.40% |
| Andrey Andreychenko | Liberal Democratic Party | 20,427 | 10.09% |
| Vitaly Libanov | Communists of Russia | 15,862 | 7.83% |
| Maksim Beloborodov | A Just Russia — For Truth | 14,623 | 7.22% |
| Oleg Nisenbaum | Party of Pensioners | 9,612 | 4.75% |
| Sergey Matlin | Party of Growth | 4,632 | 2.29% |
| Darya Sapronova | The Greens | 4,405 | 2.18% |
| Svetlana Petropavlova | Rodina | 3,028 | 1.50% |
| Aleksandr Filkov | Russian Party of Freedom and Justice | 2,635 | 1.30% |
| Total | | 202,511 | 100% |

=== 2026 ===
Summary of the 18-20 September 2026 Russian legislative election in the Vladivostok constituency
| Candidate | Party | Votes | % |
|---|---|---|---|
| Aleksandr Shcherbakov (incumbent) | United Russia | 184,908 | 59.91% |
| Andrey Andreychenko | Liberal Democratic Party | 38,314 | 12.41% |
| Gennady Kulikov | Communist Party | 26,169 | 8.48% |
| Vladomir Rassadin | New People | 22,528 | 7.30% |
| Nina Chepakhina | A Just Russia | 12,798 | 4.15% |
| Vyacheslav Baydelyuk | Party of Pensioners | 7,419 | 2.40% |
| Aleksandr Andoni | Communists of Russia | 7,369 | 2.39% |
| Konstantin Kleymyonov | The Greens | 3,972 | 1.29% |
| Total | | 308,646 | 100% |
