= Artyom constituency =

Constituency of the State Duma of the Russian Federation

Artyom single-member constituency
- Constituency of the Russian State Duma

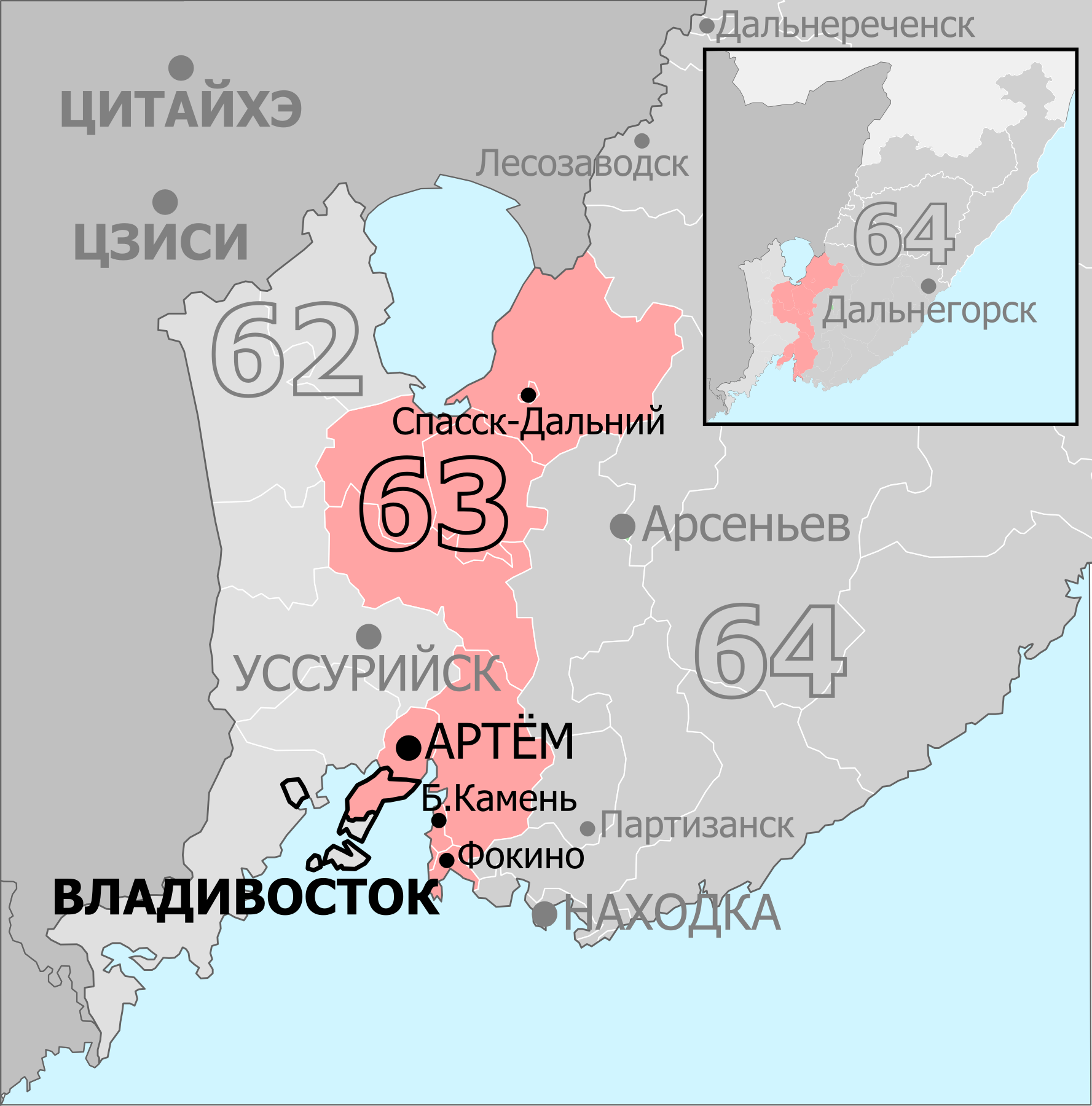
- Constituency boundaries since 2016
- Deputy: Gennady Bukayev; United Russia
- Federal subject: Primorsky Krai
- Districts: Artyom, Bolshoy Kamen, Chernigovsky, Fokino, Khorolsky, Mikhaylovsky, Shkotovsky, Spassk-Dalny, Spassky, Vladivostok (Pervorechensky, Sovetsky)
- Voters: 462,198 (2026)

The Artyom constituency (No.67 (Note: No.63 in 2016–2026)) is a Russian legislative constituency in Primorsky Krai. The constituency stretches from Vladivostok in the south to Spassk-Dalny in the north, including the towns of Artyom and Fokino.

The constituency has been represented since 2026 by United Russia deputy Gennady Bukayev, former Rosneft vice president and Minister of Russia for Tax and Revenue, who won the open seat, succeeding two-term United Russia incumbent Vladimir Novikov.

== Boundaries ==
2016–present: Artyom, Bolshoy Kamen, Chernigovsky District, Fokino, Khorolsky District, Mikhaylovsky District, Shkotovsky District, Spassk-Dalny, Spassky District, Vladivostok (Pervorechensky, Sovetsky)
The constituency was created for the 2016 election from parts of former Vladivostok (outer Vladivostok and Artyom), Ussuriysk (Bolshoy Kamen, Fokino, Shkotovo) and Arsenyev (Khorol and Spassk-Dalny) constituencies.

== Members elected ==
Election	Member	Party
2016	Vladimir Novikov	United Russia
2021	Vladimir Novikov	United Russia
2026	Gennady Bukayev	United Russia

== Election results ==
=== 2016 ===
Summary of the 18 September 2016 Russian legislative election in the Artyom constituency
Candidate	Party	Votes	%
Vladimir Novikov	United Russia	65,877	37.76%
Aleksey Korniyenko	Communist Party	26,392	15.13%
Roman Meleshkin	Liberal Democratic Party	21,900	12.55%
Olga Kolchina	Communists of Russia	15,341	8.79%
Aleksey Kozitsky	A Just Russia	14,559	8.35%
Larisa Butenko	Party of Growth	7,685	4.41%
Aleksey Klyotskin	Yabloko	4,993	2.86%
Viktor Kaplunenko	Rodina	4,076	2.34%
Vladimir Shcherbatyuk	The Greens	2,951	1.69%
Total		174,454	100%

=== 2021 ===
Summary of the 17-19 September 2021 Russian legislative election in the Artyom constituency
Candidate	Party	Votes	%
Vladimir Novikov (incumbent)	United Russia	71,480	35.44%
Andrey Akimov	Communist Party	59,966	29.74%
Aleksey Kozitsky	A Just Russia — For Truth	16,618	8.24%
Vyacheslav Baydelyuk	Party of Pensioners	12,125	6.01%
Nikolay Selyuk	Liberal Democratic Party	10,175	5.05%
Denis Grigoryev	New People	7,063	3.50%
Kirill Batanov	Party of Growth	4,835	2.40%
Aleksandr Rudkovsky	Russian Party of Freedom and Justice	4,238	2.10%
Sergey Poltorak	Yabloko	3,261	1.62%
Total		187,691	100%

=== 2026 ===
Summary of the 18-20 September 2026 Russian legislative election in the Artyom constituency
Candidate	Party	Votes	%
Gennady Bukayev	United Russia	182,358	61.09%
Vasily Vasilyev	Liberal Democratic Party	32,628	10.93%
Andrey Akimov	Communist Party	28,983	9.71%
Pavel Railko	New People	23,403	7.84%
Matvey Apakayev	A Just Russia	15,663	5.25%
Ivan Trutnev	Party of Pensioners	11,958	4.01%
Total		298,528	100%
