= Partizansky District, Russia =

One of two districts in Russia

Location of Krasnoyarsk Krai in Russia

Location of Primorsky Krai in Russia

Partizansky District is the name of several administrative and municipal districts in Russia:

- Partizansky District, Krasnoyarsk Krai, an administrative and municipal district of Krasnoyarsk Krai
- Partizansky District, Primorsky Krai, an administrative and municipal district of Primorsky Krai
  - Nikolayevka (air base), a naval airbase located within the district

== See also ==
- Partizansky (disambiguation)
