= Administrative divisions of Primorsky Krai =

Primorsky Krai Russia
- Administrative center: Vladivostok

Administrative structure (as of 2014)
- Districts: 22
- Cities/towns: 12
- Urban-type settlements: 27
- Selsovets: 0

Municipal structure (as of 2002)
- Rural settlements: 606 (inhabited); 4 (uninhabited)

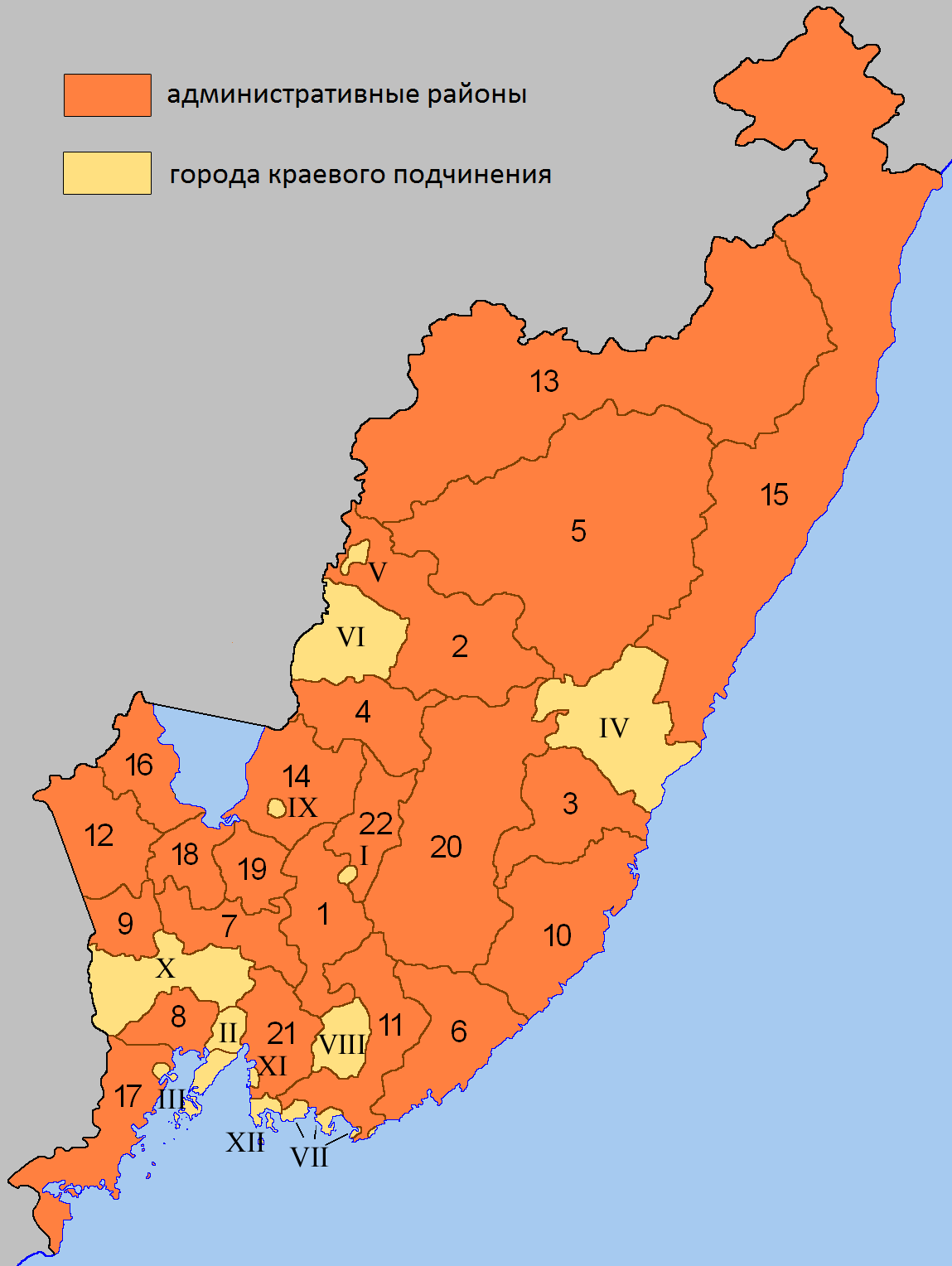
Map of the Primorsky Krai (with normal numbered & Roman numerical)

The Primorye region in the Far Eastern Federal District of the Russian Federation is divided into 22 raions and 12 urban districts . A total of 28 urban and 117 rural communities are subordinate to the raions (as of 2010).

== Administrative and municipal divisions ==
Map

Division		Structure		OKATO	OKTMO	Urban-type settlement/ resort settlement*
Division		Administrative	Municipal	OKATO	OKTMO	Urban-type settlement/ resort settlement*
Fokino (Фокино)		city (ZATO)	urban okrug	05 547	05 747	Dunay (Дунай); Putyatin (Путятин)
Vladivostok (Владивосток)		city	urban okrug	05 401	05 701	
↳	Frunzensky (Фрунзенский)	(under Vladivostok)	—N/a	05 401	—N/a	
↳	Leninsky (Ленинский)	(under Vladivostok)	—N/a	05 401	—N/a	
↳	Pervomaysky (Первомайский)	(under Vladivostok)	—N/a	05 401	—N/a	
↳	Pervorechensky (Первореченский)	(under Vladivostok)	—N/a	05 401	—N/a	
↳	Sovetsky (Советский)	(under Vladivostok)	—N/a	05 401	—N/a	
Arsenyev (Арсеньев)		city	urban okrug	05 403	05 703	
Artyom (Артём)		city	urban okrug	05 405	05 705	
Bolshoy Kamen (Большой Камень)		city	urban okrug	05 406	05 706	
Dalnegorsk (Дальнегорск)		city	urban okrug	05 407	05 707	
Dalnerechensk (Дальнереченск)		city	urban okrug	05 408	05 708	
Lesozavodsk (Лесозаводск)		city	urban okrug	05 411	05 711	
Nakhodka (Находка)		city	urban okrug	05 414	05 714	
Partizansk (Партизанск)		city	urban okrug	05 417	05 717	
Spassk-Dalny (Спасск-Дальний)		city	urban okrug	05 420	05 720	
Ussuriysk (Уссурийск)		city	urban okrug	05 423	05 723	
Anuchinsky (Анучинский)		district	okrug	05 202	05 602	
Dalnerechensky (Дальнереченский)		district		05 207	05 607	
Kavalerovsky (Кавалеровский)		district		05 210	05 610	Gornorechensky (Горнореченский); Kavalerovo (Кавалерово); Khrustalny (Хрустальный)
Kirovsky (Кировский)		district		05 212	05 612	Gornye Klyuchi (Горные Ключи) resort settlement*; Kirovsky (Кировский)
Krasnoarmeysky (Красноармейский)		district		05 214	05 614	Vostok (Восток)
Lazovsky (Лазовский)		district	okrug	05 217	05 617	Preobrazheniye (Преображение)
Mikhaylovsky (Михайловский)		district		05 220	05 620	Novoshakhtinsky (Новошахтинский)
Nadezhdinsky (Надеждинский)		district		05 223	05 623	
Oktyabrsky (Октябрьский)		district	okrug	05 226	05 626	Lipovtsy (Липовцы)
Olginsky (Ольгинский)		district		05 228	05 628	Olga (Ольга)
Partizansky (Партизанский)		district		05 230	05 630	
Pogranichny (Пограничный)		district	okrug	05 232	05 632	Pogranichny (Пограничный)
Pozharsky (Пожарский)		district		05 234	05 634	Luchegorsk (Лучегорск)
Spassky (Спасский)		district		05 237	05 637	
Terneysky (Тернейский)		district	okrug	05 240	05 640	Plastun (Пластун); Svetlaya (Светлая); Terney (Терней)
Khankaysky (Ханкайский)		district	okrug	05 246	05 646	
Khasansky (Хасанский)		district		05 248	05 648	Khasan (Хасан); Kraskino (Краскино); Posyet (Посьет); Primorsky (Приморский); Slavyanka (Славянка); Zarubino (Зарубино)
Khorolsky (Хорольский)		district	okrug	05 250	05 650	Yaroslavsky (Ярославский)
Chernigovsky (Черниговский)		district		05 253	05 653	Sibirtsevo (Сибирцево)
Chuguyevsky (Чугуевский)		district	okrug	05 255	05 655	
Shkotovsky (Шкотовский)		district		05 257	05 657	Shkotovo (Шкотово); Smolyaninovo (Смоляниново)
Yakovlevsky (Яковлевский)		district		05 259	05 659	
