= Partizansky =

Partizansky (masculine), Partizanskaya (feminine), or Partizanskoye (neuter) may refer to:

- Partizansky District, several districts in the countries of the former Soviet Union
- Partizansky Urban Okrug, a municipal formation which Partizansk Town Under Krai Jurisdiction in Primorsky Krai, Russia is incorporated as
- Partizansky (rural locality) (Partizanskaya, Partizanskoye), several rural localities in Russia
- Partizanskaya (Moscow Metro), a metro station of the Moscow Metro, Moscow, Russia
- Partizanskaya (river), a river in Primorsky Krai, Russia
