= 305th Artillery Brigade (Russia) =

- 305-я артиллерийская бригада
- Founded: 26 December 2014
- Branch: Russian Ground Forces
- Type: Artillery brigade
- Part of: 5th Guards Combined Arms Army
- Garrison/HQ: Ussuriysk and Pokrovka, Russia
- Engagements: Russian invasion of Ukraine

The 305th Gumbinnen Artillery Order of the Red Star Brigade (Russian: 305-я артиллерийская бригада) (MUN 39255) is a tactical formation of the Ground Forces of the Russian Armed Forces. The brigade is stationed in the city of Ussuriysk, the village of Pokrovka in Primorsky Krai. The formation is part of the 5th Guards Combined Arms Army of the Eastern Military District.

== History ==
The 305th Artillery Brigade traces its history back to the Great Patriotic War, being the successor of the 20th Special Power Cannon Artillery Regiment (20 pap OM).

In turn, the regiment was created on December 14, 1944 on the basis of the 406th separate heavy cannon artillery division (406th otpadn) and the 8th separate cannon battery (8th OPBATR).

During the Gumbinnen-Gołdap operation in 1944, the 406th otpadn received the honorary name "Gumbinnen", which was transferred to the 20th pap during the reorganization.

The regiment served in the Active Army from December 14, 1944 to May 9, 1945 and from August 9 to September 3, 1945.

The 20th Pap ended the war in the Far East, where it participated in the Soviet-Japanese War as part of the 5th Army.

In the 1960s, the 20th Cannon Artillery Regiment was reformed into the 305th Artillery Brigade.

The unit's anniversaries are celebrated annually on December 28.

On August 11, 2011, the brigade was presented with a new-style banner.
