= Vladimir Novikov (politician, born 1966) =

Russian politician

- Владимир Новиков
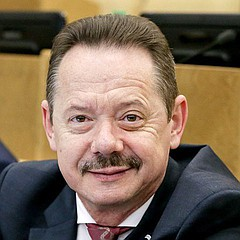

Member of the State Duma for Primorsky Krai
- Incumbent
- Assumed office 5 October 2016
- Preceded by: constituency established
- Constituency: Artyom (No. 63)

Personal details
- Born: 9 June 1966 (age 60) Tambov, Russian SFSR, USSR
- Party: United Russia
- Education: Far Eastern State Technical University

Vladimir Mikhailovich Novikov (Russian: Владимир Михайлович Новиков; born 9 June 1966, Tambov) is a Russian political figure and a deputy of the 7th and 8th State Dumas.

Novikov started his political career in 1995 when he was appointed deputy of the Artyom City Duma of the 1st convocation. In 1997, he started working as the Deputy head of administration of the city of Artyom. In 2000, Novikov served as acting head of the Artyom city administration and, a year later, he officially became the mayor. In 2016-2021, he served as deputy of the 7th State Duma from the Primorsky Krai constituency. In 2021, he was re-elected for the 8th State Duma.

== Awards ==
- Order "For Merit to the Fatherland"
- Order of Friendship
