= Patriotic Blood Corps =

1931–1932 Korean militant activist group

- Leaders: Kang Guk-mo; Kim Guk-cho
- Founded: 1920
- Dissolved: 1921
- Country: Korea
- Allegiance: Provisional Government of the Republic of Korea
- Headquarters: Baedalchon, Wuyun, Jiayin County, Yichun City, Heilongjiang Province, China
- Ideology: Korean independence movement
- Size: 700 to 800

- Patriotic Blood Corps
- Hangul: 혈성단
- Hanja: 血誠團
- RR: Hyeolseongdan
- MR: Hyŏlsŏngdan

The Patriotic Blood Corps (Korean: 혈성단) also known as the Korean Patriotic Youth Blood Corps was an anti-Japanese armed group organized in Chupung, Primorsky Krai, Russia in 1920. It was founded by Kang Guk-mo, Kim Jong-hwa, and others based on members of the Korean Independence Corps who had moved from Western Jiandao. Chae Young (蔡英) was appointed commander and won the battle against the Japanese army in June 1920. In October 1920, it moved to Annuchino and integrated with the Sucheong army and the New People's Unit, but returned to Chupung in the fall of 1921.

== History ==
In 1918, 18 young people, including Kim Un-hak, Park Chun-geun, Kim Bong-gi, and Kim Hyeong-sik organized branches in various places and dispatched personnel to purchase weapons. Leader Kim Un-hak went to Okhotsk and gathered 120 Korean workers working in gold mines to form a group. Kim Un-hak collected 4 buds of gold [буд, 1 bud is about 16 kg] as alms. Kang Guk-mo brought them to Vladivostok to meet with Shin han-chon. Then they went to Jaepigou, a village in the district's Yeoho village.

After hearing the news of the March 1st Movement in 1919, Kang decided to join the independence movement and held a large amount of gold from the mine. They bought weapons with the gold. In the fall, the unit was expanded by absorbing the independence unit of Choi Young-ho, who was assassinated while wandering around the Grodekovo area in Russia.

=== Founding ===
In January 1920, after the March 1st Movement in Japygou, a Korean village in Chupung, Primorsky Krai, Russia. Koreans from Otsuk, Kang Guk-mo, Kim Jong-hwa and others, who brought with them the funds they had raised, moved from West Jiandao to the Primorsky Krai and organized around 80 members of the Korean Independence Association who had been in Grodekovo as a basis and established the Patriotic Blood Corps.

In May 1920, Chae Young brought 15 members of the New People's Corps (Shimindan) and joined them. The Blood Loyalty Corps entrusted him with responsibility for the military sector. In alliance with the New People's Corps troops and the Red Army, they fought a battle against the Japanese army at Sibechang near Zapigou and won. In China, they fought against the Japanese in Honghouzhi, and continued to engage in small-scale battles, disrupting the rear of the Japanese army.

=== Joining the Korean Independence Corps ===
In October 1920, after the Battle of Cheongsanri, they joined the armed groups gathered at Milsan and formed the Korean Independence Corps. To avoid pursuit by the Japanese army, they left Chupung and moved to Annuchino, where the headquarters of the Russian partisan unit was located. In November, this unit merged with Han Chang-geol's Suqing army and Park Gyeong-cheol's New People's Corps (Shimindan) at Trechii-pujin, a Korean village in the Chuguyev Valley. The commander of the integrated unit was Chae Young.

=== Reorganization ===
In Nov. 28, 1920, they moved to Baededun, Ohun County, Heilongjiang Province, Manchuria, and officially named the unit the Korean Patriotic Youth Blood Corps. Then they moved to Baedalchon, Baedalchon was an independence movement base located at the most northern place among the Korean villages in Manchuria and the Maritime Province, it was at the current administrative district of Wuyun, Jiayin County, Yichun City, Heilongjiang Province. Kim named this place as "Ounhyeon Baedaltun."

In early 1921, they moved to Iman, Maritime Province, then crossed over to Free City to engage in independence activities. Then Chae young and Jo Maeng-seon left for Irkutsk with Kim Gyeong-cheon's troops. He invited the officers to organize a military academy and train soldiers with Kim and the Korean Communist Party's Irkutsk Faction. On June 28, 1921, Free City Incident arose between Kim Gyeong-cheon, Kang Guk-mo, and Han Chang-geol over the operation of the unit. Son Pungik was shot to death, and the integrated unit was disbanded, and Kang Guk-mo returned to Chupung with some comrades and rebuilt the Patriotic Blood Corps. In the fall, the Patriotic Blood Corps participated in the battle to retake Olga Port led by Lee Won. In November 1922, the order to disarm the Korean partisan unit was issued, and the Korean Patriotic Youth Blood Corps was disbanded.

== Organization ==
The executives of the Patriotic Blood Corps are the leader Kang Guk-mo, commander Chae Young, chief of staff Han Il-je, and treasurer Wang Chae-ho. After the reorganization, the officers included Kim Guk-cho as leader, Kim Tae-il as vice leader, and Jeong Tae-ryong as secretary. It had the following departments: Secretary General Lee Seon-gu, the Ministry of Finance Jin Myeong-guk, the Ministry of Communications Jeong Bong-nam, and the Ministry of Social Affairs Cha Jong-cheol.

The number of troops reached about 350 in May 1920 which grew to 700–800 in early 1921, divided into 4 infantry platoons, 1 cavalry platoon, parent regiment, Red Cross corps, and clothing corps.

During the Battle of Fengwudong in June 1920, they captured of 5 heavy machine guns, 300 rifles, 30 war horses and 30 carriages.

== See also ==
- Korean Independence Movement
  - List of militant Korean independence activist organizations
    - Korean Independence Corps
- Free City Incident
