= Aleksandr Shcherbakov =

Aleksandr Shcherbakov may refer to:

- Aleksandr Shcherbakov (footballer) (born 1998), Russian football player
- Aleksandr Shcherbakov (20th-century politician) (1901–1945), Soviet politician and writer
- Aleksandr Shcherbakov (21st-century politician) (born 1965), Russian politician
