= Khankaysky District =

Khankaysky District Ханкайский район (Russian)
- District
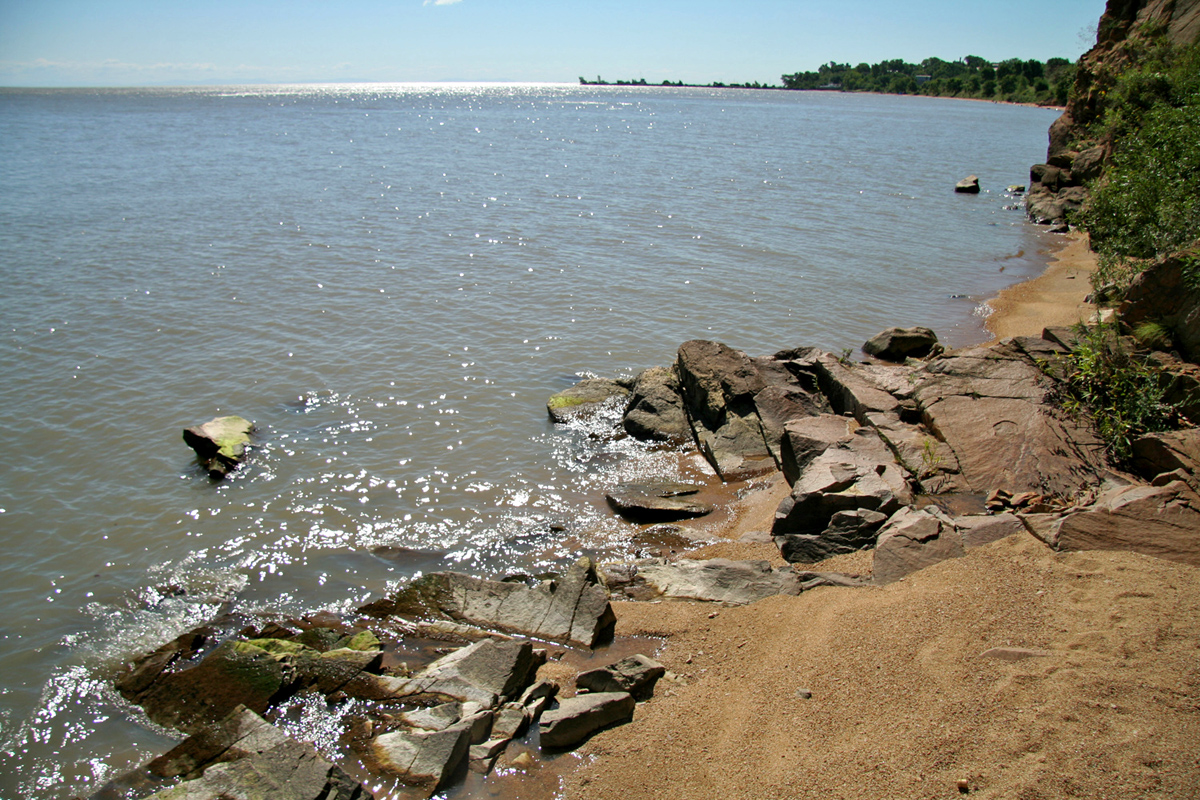
- Lake Khanka coast in Khankaysky District

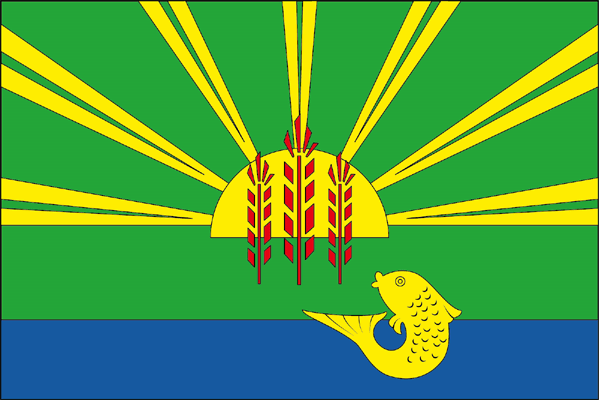
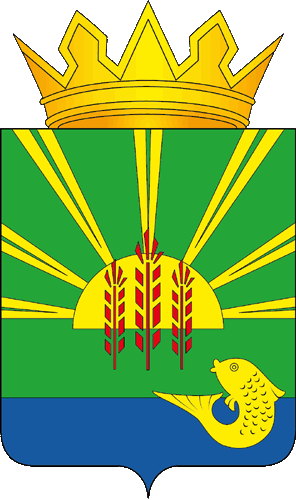
- Flag Coat of arms
- Location of Khankaysky District in Primorsky Krai
- Coordinates: 44°46′N 132°01′E
- Country: Russia
- Federal subject: Primorsky Krai
- Administrative center: Kamen-Rybolov

Area
  - Total: 2,689.0 km^{2} (1,038.2 sq mi)

Population (2010 Census)
  - Total: 24,666
  - Density: 9.1729/km^{2} (23.758/sq mi)
  - Urban: 0%
  - Rural: 100%

Administrative structure
  - Inhabited localities: 25 rural localities

Municipal structure
  - Municipally incorporated as: Khankaysky Municipal District
  - Municipal divisions: 0 urban settlements, 3 rural settlements
- Time zone: UTC+10 (MSK+7)
- OKTMO ID: 05646000
- Website: http://www.admin.hanka.ru

Khankaysky District (Russian: Ханка́йский райо́н) is an administrative and municipal district (raion), one of the twenty-two in Primorsky Krai, Russia. It is located in the west of the krai on the western bank of Lake Khanka and borders with Pogranichny District in the southwest, Khorolsky District in the southeast, and with Heilongjiang Province of China in the west. The area of the district is 2,689.0 square kilometers (1,038.2 sq mi). Its administrative center is the rural locality (a selo) of Kamen-Rybolov. Population: 24,666 (2010 census); 28,939 (2002 census); 31,122 (1989 Soviet census). The population of Kamen-Rybolov accounts for 44.2% of the district's total population.

== Economy ==
Khankaysky District is one of the largest agricultural regions of the krai. The area of agricultural grounds totals 1,230 square kilometers (470 sq mi). Soybeans, rice, buckwheat, and vegetables are cultivated. Meat, milk, and honey are also produced in the district. Fish breeding is cultivated in ponds.

Another feature of this district is a customs point, Tury Rog, which is located on the Russian-Chinese border. Heavy track traffic passes through this point. Close to the customs point is a large Chinese coal mining basin, Jixi.

There are no large industrial enterprises in this area, which helps keep the recreational zones ecologically clean.
