= Partizansky District =

Partizansky District may refer to:

- Partizansky District, Russia, name of several districts in Russia
- Partyzanski District, a city district of Minsk, Belarus
