= Victoria Nikolaeva =

Russian politician

- Виктория Николаева
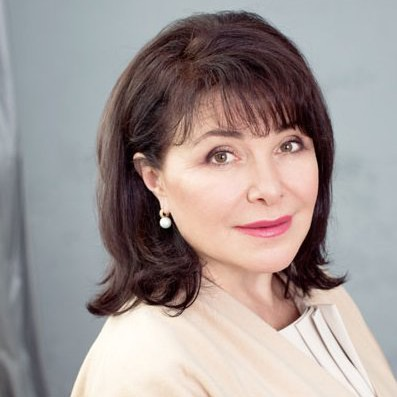

Member of the State Duma for Primorsky Krai
- Incumbent
- Assumed office 5 October 2016
- Preceded by: constituency re-established
- Constituency: Arsenyev (No. 64)

Personal details
- Born: 21 November 1962 (age 63) Vladivostok, RSFSR, USSR
- Party: United Russia
- Relatives: Vladimir Nikolayev (brother)
- Education: Vladivostok State University of Economics and Service
- Occupation: Economist; Businesswoman

Victoria Victorovna Nikolaeva (Russian: Виктория Викторовна Николаева; born 21 November 1962, Vladivostok) is a Russian political figure and a deputy of the 7th and 8th State Dumas.

While studying at the Vladivostok State University of Economics and Service, Nikolaeva also worked as a figure skating coach at the youth sports school in Vladivostok. After graduating, she worked as an accountant and economist at large fishing enterprises of the Russian Far East. Later she was appointed Deputy General Director of the Pacific Department of Fisheries Exploration and Research Fleet allegedly owned by her brother Vladimir Nikolayev. From 2005 to 2006, she served as deputy of the Legislative Assembly of Primorsky Krai of the 3rd convocation. In 2006, she joined the United Russia party. From 2011 to 2016, Nikolaeva was the deputy of the Legislative Assembly of Primorsky Krai of the 5th convocation. In 2016, she was elected deputy of the 7th State Duma. Since September 2021, she has served as deputy of the 8th State Duma from the Primorsky Krai constituency.

Nikolaeva's brother Vladimir was the mayor of Vladivostok from 2004 to 2008. He was also accused of being a member of the Russian mafia. In 2007 he was sentenced to a suspended sentence of 4.5 years in prison for abuse of office.

In 2018, Nikolaeva supported raising the retirement age, and in 2019, she was among those who approved the Sovereign Internet Law.

== Sanctions ==
She was sanctioned by the UK government in 2022 in relation to the Russo-Ukrainian War.
