= Vladimiro-Alexandrovskoye =

Rural locality in Primorsky Krai, Russia

Coordinates: 42°53′32″N 133°04′31″E

Vladimiro-Alexandrovskoye (Russian: Владимиро-Александровское) is a rural locality (a selo) and the administrative center of Partizansky District, Primorsky Krai, Russia. Population: 5,708 (2010 census); 5,577 (2002 census); 5,636 (1989 Soviet census).

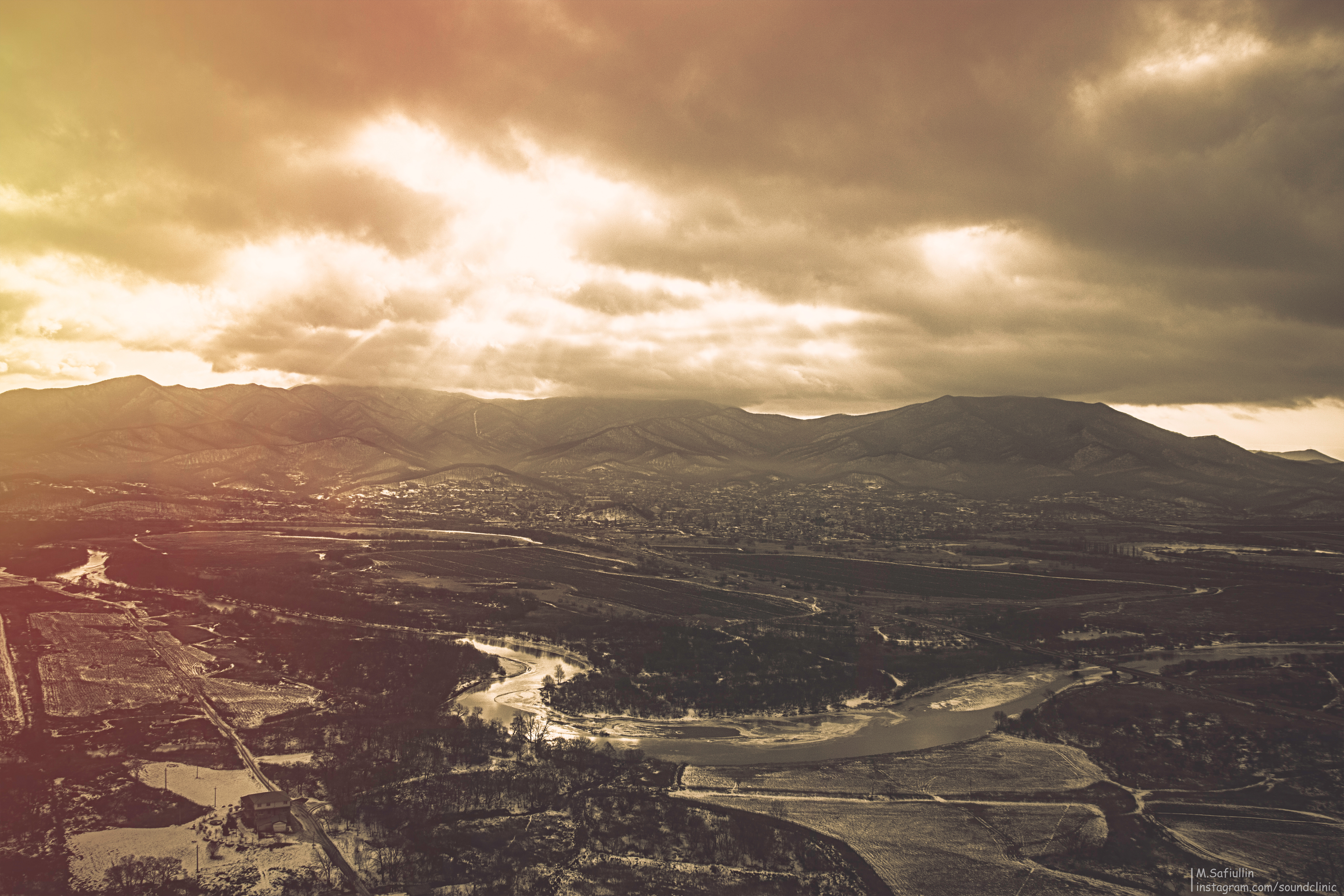
View of the village from the top of the Ekaterinovsky massif in November

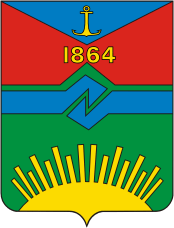
Coat of Arms of Vladimiro-Alexandrovskoye
