= Nikolayevka (air base) =

Airport in Russia

Nikolayevka Nikolaevka
- Никоаевка/Золотая Долина
- Partizansky District, Primorsky Krai in Russia

Site information
- Type: Air Base
- Owner: Ministry of Defence
- Operator: Russian Navy - Russian Naval Aviation
- Controlled by: Pacific Fleet

Location
- Shown within Primorsky Krai Nikolayevka (Russia)
- Coordinates: 43°05′06″N 133°11′40″E

Site history
- Built: 1945
- In use: 1945 - present

Airfield information
- Identifiers: ICAO: UHWE
- Elevation: 61 metres (200 ft) AMSL
Runways
Direction	Length and surface
04/22	2,800 metres (9,186 ft) Concrete

Nikolayevka is an airbase of the Russian Navy located within Partizansky District, Primorsky Krai, Russia.

The base is home to the 289th Independent Composite Antisubmarine Aviation Regiment of the 7062nd Port-Arthur Naval Aviation Air Base.

The base was home to the:

- 36th Maritime Torpedo Aviation Regiment between 1955 and 1960.
- 47th Fighter Aviation Regiment between 1948 and 1949.
- 77th Independent Long-Range Anti-Submarine Aviation Regiment between 1969 and 1993.
- 567th Guards Maritime Torpedo Aviation Regiment between 1945 and 1960.
- 568th Maritime Torpedo Aviation Regiment during 1953.
- 867th Guards Maritime Torpedo Aviation Regiment between 1961 and 1965.
