= Partizansky (rural locality) =

Partizansky (Russian: Партиза́нский; masculine), Partizanskaya (Партиза́нская; feminine), or Partizanskoye (Партиза́нское; neuter) is the name of several rural localities in Russia:

- Partizansky, Altai Krai, a settlement in Soloneshensky District of Altai Krai
- Partizansky, name of several other rural localities
- Partizanskaya (rural locality), a village in Gdovsky District of Pskov Oblast
- Partizanskoye, Krasnoyarsk Krai, a selo in Partizansky District of Krasnoyarsk Krai
- Partizanskoye, name of several other rural localities
