= Pokrovka, Oktyabrsky District, Primorsky Krai =

Pokrovka Покровка
- Selo
- Location within Primorsky Krai Location within Russia
- Country: Russia
- Region: Primorsky Krai
- District: Oktyabrsky District
- Time zone: UTC+10:00

Pokrovka (Russian: Горный) is a rural locality (a selo) and the administrative centre of Oktyabrsky District, Primorsky Krai, Russia. Population: 10,360 (2010 census); 10,873 (2002 census);
