= Partizansky District, Primorsky Krai =

Partizansky District Партизанский район (Russian)
- District
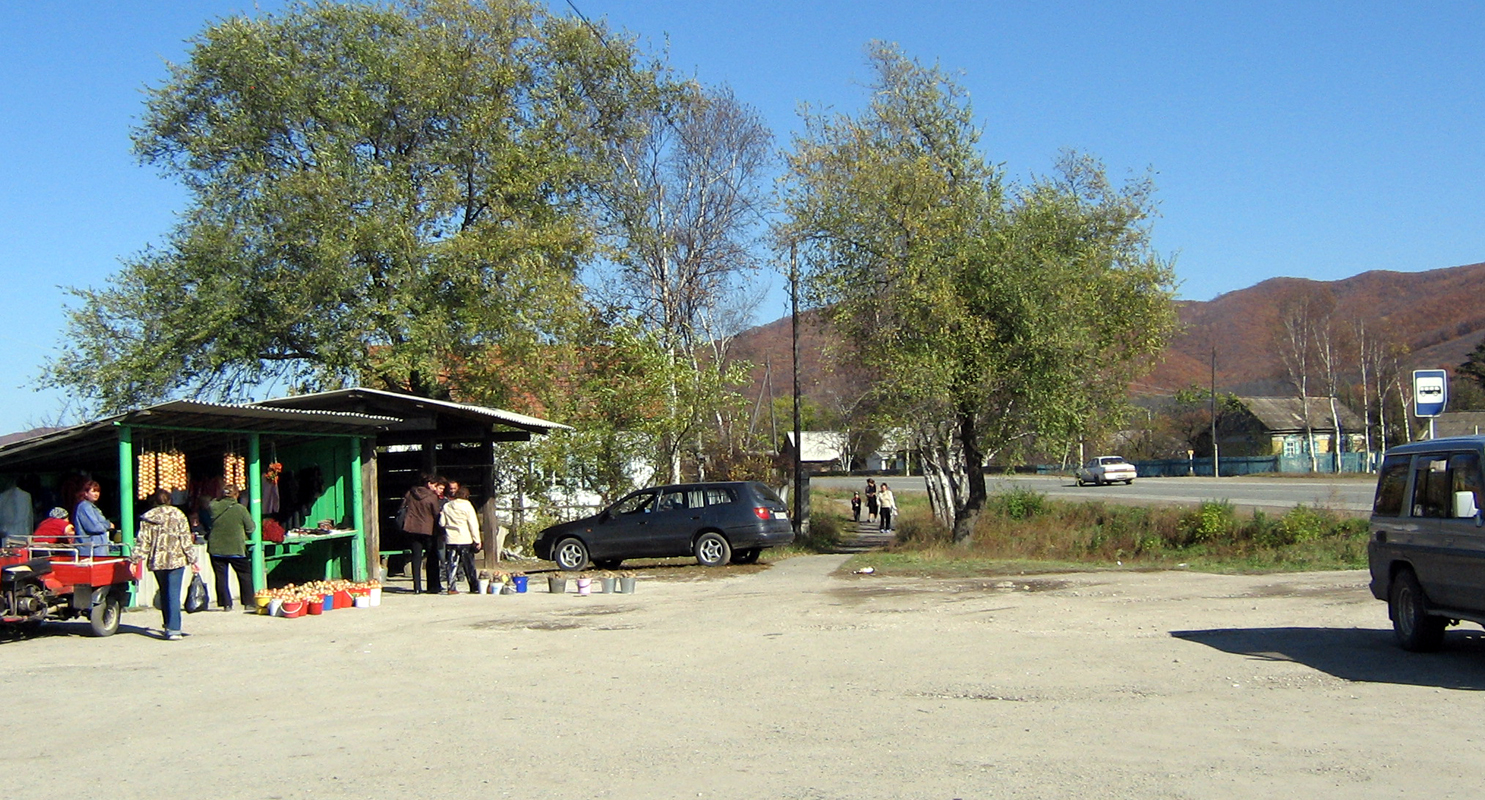
- The selo of Frolovka in Partizansky District

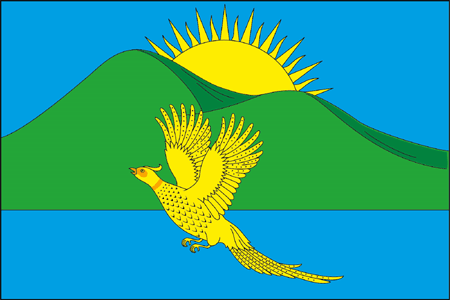
- Flag Coat of arms
- Location of Partizansky District in Primorsky Krai
- Coordinates: 42°54′N 133°06′E
- Country: Russia
- Federal subject: Primorsky Krai
- Established: 1932
- Administrative center: Vladimiro-Alexandrovskoye

Area
  - Total: 4,253.9 km^{2} (1,642.4 sq mi)

Population (2010 Census)
  - Total: 30,238
  - Density: 7.1083/km^{2} (18.410/sq mi)
  - Urban: 0%
  - Rural: 100%

Administrative structure
  - Inhabited localities: 27 rural localities

Municipal structure
  - Municipally incorporated as: Partizansky Municipal District
  - Municipal divisions: 0 urban settlements, 6 rural settlements
- Time zone: UTC+10 (MSK+7)
- OKTMO ID: 05630000
- Website: http://rayon.partizansky.ru/

Partizansky District (Russian: Партиза́нский райо́н) is an administrative and municipal district (raion), one of the twenty-two in Primorsky Krai, Russia. It is located in the south of the krai and borders with Chuguyevsky District in the north and northeast, Lazovsky District in the east, the territory of Nakhodka City Under Krai Jurisdiction and the Sea of Japan in the south, the territory of Partizansk Town Under Krai Jurisdiction and Shkotovsky District in the west, and with Anuchinsky District in the northwest and north. The area of the district is 4,253.9 square kilometers (1,642.4 sq mi). Its administrative center is the rural locality (a selo) of Vladimiro-Alexandrovskoye. Population: 30,238 (2010 census); 31,666 (2002 census); 29,455 (1989 Soviet census). The population of Vladimiro-Alexandrovskoye accounts for 18.9% of the district's total population.

== Geography ==
The territory of the Partizanskaya River basin is one of the warmest valleys in the Russian Far East.

== History ==
The district was established in 1932.
