= Pogranichny, Primorsky Krai =

Pogranichny Пограничный
- Urban-type settlement
- Interactive map of Pogranichny
- Location of Pogranichny Pogranichny (Primorsky Krai)
- Coordinates: 44°24′N 131°23′E
- Country: Russia
- Federal subject: Primorsky Krai
- Administrative district: Pogranichny District
- Gorodevko: 1898
- Urban-type settlement status since: 1936

Population (2010 Census)
  - Total: 10,280
  - Estimate (2023): 9,793 (−4.7%)

Administrative status
  - Capital of: Pogranichny District
- Time zone: UTC+10 (MSK+7)
- Postal code: 692582
- Dialing code: +7 42345
- OKTMO ID: 05632151051

Pogranichny (Russian: Пограни́чный) is an urban locality (an urban-type settlement) and the administrative center of Pogranichny District of Primorsky Krai, Russia, located 15 kilometers (9.3 mi) east of the China–Russia border and 140 kilometers (87 mi) northwest of Vladivostok. Population: 10,280 (2010 census); 12,221 (2002 census); 11,333 (1989 Soviet census).

== History ==
In 1898 Orenburg Cossacks from the first Host district founded the Grodekovo (Гроде́ково) railway station, named after Nikolay Ivanovich Grodekov, Governor General of Priamurye (in office: 1898–1902). The settlement received its present name, "Pogranichny" – which means "border (town)" – in 1958.

== Cross-border rail traffic ==
The railway station in Pogranichny (still called Grodekovo for railway purposes) is the first one east of the Sino-Russian border on the Harbin–Ussuriysk (for Vladivostok) branch of the former Chinese Eastern Railway, the "Trans Manchurian Line". There are currently (December 2013) no through passenger trains between Harbin and Ussuriysk; however, two local trains daily in each direction connect Suifenhe (the last Chinese station on the western side of the border) to Pogranichny. The 27-km journey takes around 1 hour and 25 minutes.

== Climate ==
Pogranichny has a humid continental climate (Köppen climate classification Dwb), with very cold and dry winters and very warm and wet summers.

Climate data for Pogranichny
Month	Jan	Feb	Mar	Apr	May	Jun	Jul	Aug	Sep	Oct	Nov	Dec	Year
Record high °C (°F)	6.8 (44.2)	13.7 (56.7)	21.3 (70.3)	30.2 (86.4)	35.0 (95.0)	36.9 (98.4)	39.0 (102.2)	39.2 (102.6)	33.5 (92.3)	30.4 (86.7)	21.3 (70.3)	12.0 (53.6)	39.2 (102.6)
Mean daily maximum °C (°F)	−9.5 (14.9)	−5.2 (22.6)	2.7 (36.9)	12.9 (55.2)	19.7 (67.5)	23.5 (74.3)	26.7 (80.1)	26.5 (79.7)	21.4 (70.5)	14.0 (57.2)	2.3 (36.1)	−7.0 (19.4)	10.7 (51.2)
Daily mean °C (°F)	−15.4 (4.3)	−11.7 (10.9)	−3.9 (25.0)	5.6 (42.1)	12.3 (54.1)	16.9 (62.4)	20.6 (69.1)	20.6 (69.1)	14.4 (57.9)	6.5 (43.7)	−4.0 (24.8)	−12.7 (9.1)	4.1 (39.4)
Mean daily minimum °C (°F)	−20.4 (−4.7)	−17.0 (1.4)	−9.4 (15.1)	−0.7 (30.7)	5.7 (42.3)	11.2 (52.2)	15.7 (60.3)	15.8 (60.4)	8.8 (47.8)	0.7 (33.3)	−9.1 (15.6)	−17.4 (0.7)	−1.3 (29.6)
Record low °C (°F)	−36.9 (−34.4)	−33.0 (−27.4)	−27.6 (−17.7)	−14.5 (5.9)	−4.2 (24.4)	2.0 (35.6)	5.1 (41.2)	5.6 (42.1)	−3.1 (26.4)	−13.1 (8.4)	−28.6 (−19.5)	−35.2 (−31.4)	−36.9 (−34.4)
Average precipitation mm (inches)	6.7 (0.26)	8.1 (0.32)	13.1 (0.52)	25.3 (1.00)	58.6 (2.31)	95.3 (3.75)	117.2 (4.61)	122.5 (4.82)	64.5 (2.54)	37.2 (1.46)	14.5 (0.57)	9.5 (0.37)	572.5 (22.53)
Average precipitation days (≥ 0.1 mm)	4.4	3.7	5.6	6.8	9.3	8.2	11.4	8.3	5.5	4.6	4.8	4.5	77.1
Average relative humidity (%)	63.2	58.8	55.7	56.1	64.4	74.0	81.8	78.7	70.2	59.3	59.0	61.8	65.3
Mean monthly sunshine hours	183	190	230	215	239	215	208	210	222	214	182	163	2,471
Source 1: climatebase.ru (1930-2008)
Source 2: NOAA (sun only, 1961-1990)

== Notable people ==
Russian actor Leonid Yarmolnik and Mayor of Barnaul Vladimir Kolganov were born in Grodekovo. Russian poet Arseny Nesmelov died here.
