= Aleksandr Shcherbakov (Russian politician) =

Russian politician

- Александр Щербаков
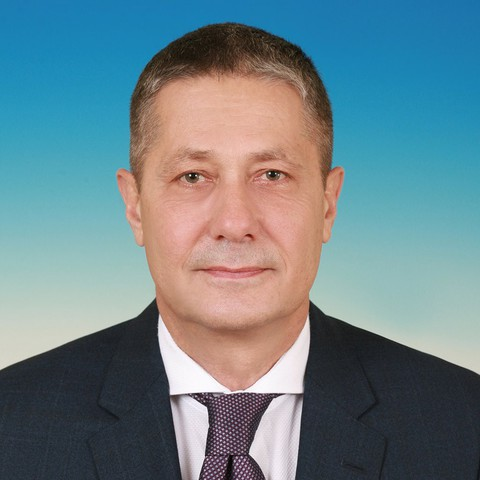
- official portrait, circa 2021

Member of the State Duma
- Incumbent
- Assumed office 12 October 2021
- Preceded by: Sergey Sopchuk
- Constituency: Vladivostok (No. 62)

Personal details
- Born: 12 March 1965 (age 61) Vladivostok, RSFSR, USSR
- Party: United Russia
- Education: Maritime State University

Alexander Vladimirovich Shcherbakov (Russian: Александр Владимирович Щербаков; born 12 March 1965) is a Russian politician. A member of United Russia, he has represented Vladivostok constituency in the State Duma since 2021.

== Sanctions ==
He was sanctioned by the UK government in 2022 in relation to the Russo-Ukrainian War.

== Electoral record ==
Summary of the 17-19 September 2021 Russian legislative election in the Vladivostok constituency
Candidate	Party	Votes	%
Aleksandr Shcherbakov	United Russia	70,057	34.59%
Artyom Samsonov	Communist Party	45,359	22.40%
Andrey Andreychenko	Liberal Democratic Party	20,427	10.09%
Vitaly Libanov	Communists of Russia	15,862	7.83%
Maksim Beloborodov	A Just Russia — For Truth	14,623	7.22%
Oleg Nisenbaum	Party of Pensioners	9,612	4.75%
Sergey Matlin	Party of Growth	4,632	2.29%
Darya Sapronova	The Greens	4,405	2.18%
Svetlana Petropavlova	Rodina	3,028	1.50%
Aleksandr Filkov	Russian Party of Freedom and Justice	2,635	1.30%
Total		202,511	100%
