= Smolyaninovo =

Smolyaninovo Смоляни́ново
- Location within Russia
- Coordinates: 43°16′55″N 132°27′29″E
- Country: Russia

Smolyaninovo (Russian: Смоляни́ново) is an urban locality (an urban-type settlement) and the administrative center of Shkotovsky District of Primorsky Krai, Russia, located 45 kilometers (28 mi) from Vladivostok; 73 kilometers (45 mi) by road. Population: 6,715 (2010 census); 6,448 (2002 census); 18,831 (1989 Soviet census).

== History ==
It became the administrative center of Shkotovsky District in 2004.
