= Bolshoy Kamen =

Town in Primorsky Krai, Russia

Bolshoy Kamen Большой Камень
- Town
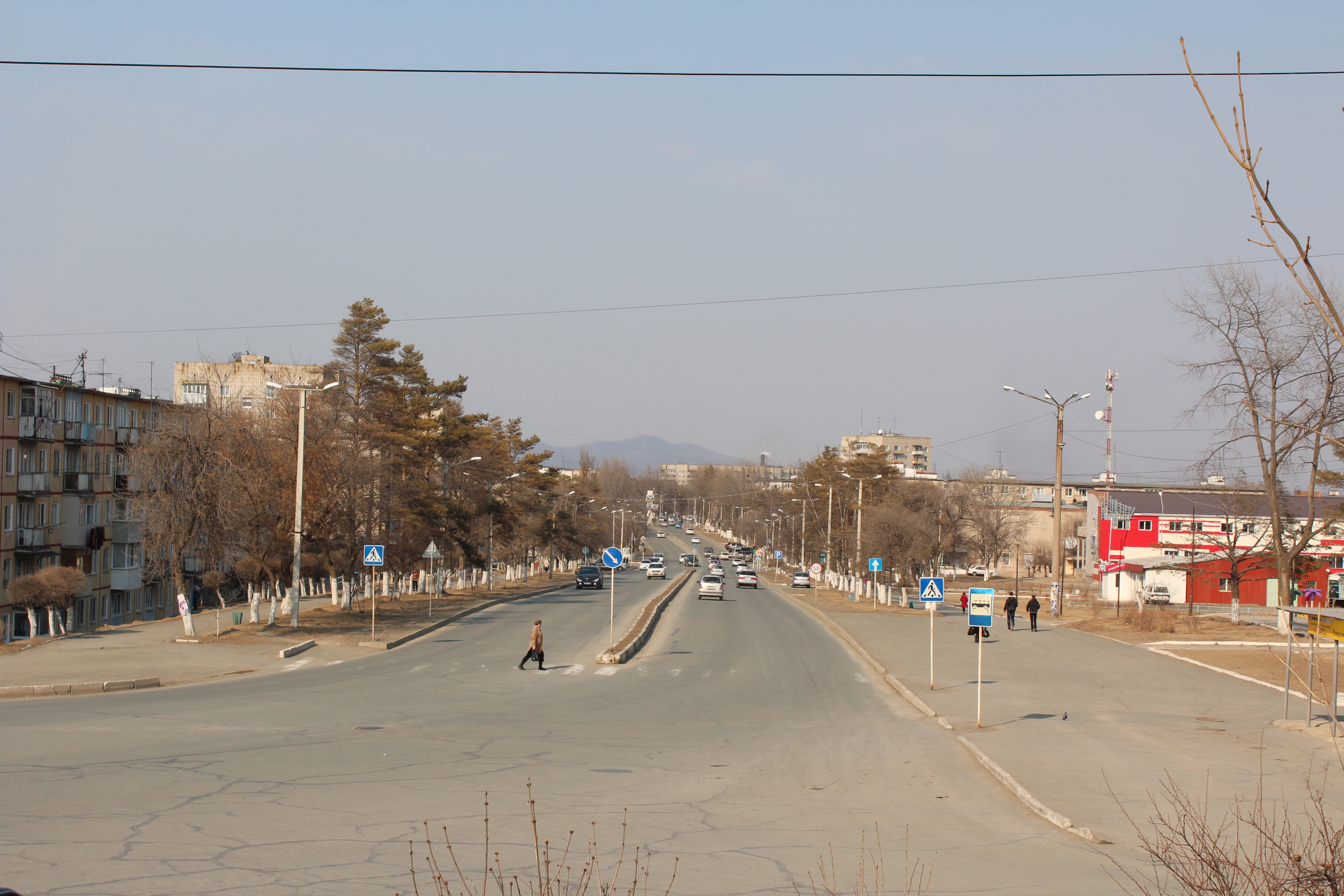
- View of the town in February 2012

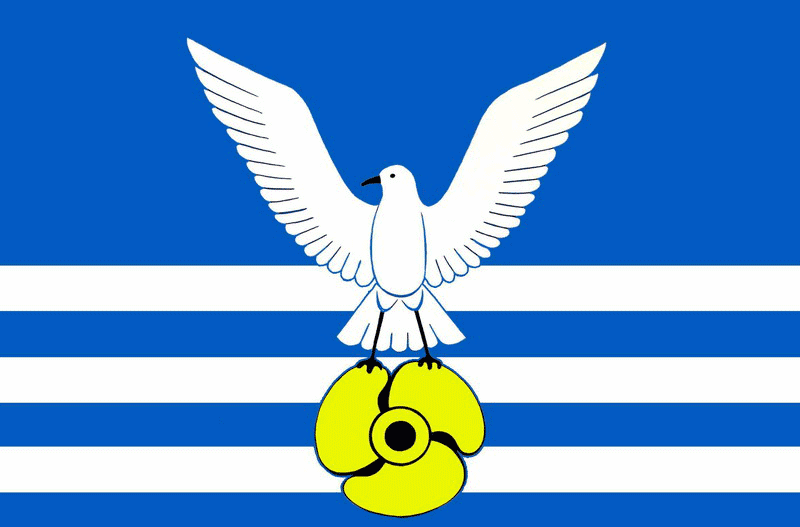
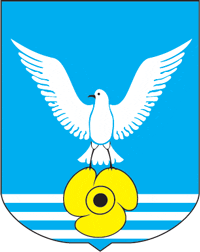
- Flag Coat of arms
- Interactive map of Bolshoy Kamen
- Location of Bolshoy Kamen Bolshoy Kamen (Primorsky Krai)
- Coordinates: 43°07′N 132°21′E
- Country: Russia
- Federal subject: Primorsky Krai
- Founded: 1947
- Town status since: 31 August 1989
- Elevation: 50 m (160 ft)

Population (2010 Census)
  - Total: 39,257
  - Estimate (2025): 40,387 (+2.9%)

Administrative status
  - Subordinated to: Bolshoy Kamen Town Under Krai Jurisdiction
  - Capital of: Bolshoy Kamen Town Under Krai Jurisdiction

Municipal status
  - Urban okrug: Bolshoy Kamen Urban Okrug
  - Capital of: Bolshoy Kamen Urban Okrug
- Time zone: UTC+10 (MSK+7)
- Postal codes: 692801–692804, 692806, 692809, 692812
- Dialing code: +7 42335
- OKTMO ID: 05706000001
- Website: www.bk.pk.ru

Bolshoy Kamen (Russian: Большой Камень, IPA: [bɐlʲˈʂoj ˈkamʲɪnʲ], lit. large stone) is a town in the south of Primorsky Krai, Russia, located on the opposite side of the Ussuri Bay as seen from Lazurnaya Bay from Vladivostok. The town was formerly a closed city owing to its naval base and the Zvezda shipyard, but this status was revoked on 1 January 2015. Population: 39,257 (2010 census); 38,394 (2002 census); 65,621 (1989 Soviet census).

== History ==
Bolshoy Kamen began as a naval support base in 1947 and was granted urban-type settlement status in 1956, followed by town status on 31 August 1989. During the Soviet era, the town's nature as a naval base saw it designated as closed. This status was revoked in 1989, with plans for a civilian harbor in the town; however, these plans were later cancelled and the town was closed again in 1996. As of 1 January 2015 the closed status was once again revoked.

== Administrative and municipal status ==
Within the framework of administrative divisions, it is, together with two rural localities, incorporated as Bolshoy Kamen Town Under Krai Jurisdiction—an administrative unit with the status equal to that of the districts. As a municipal division, Bolshoy Kamen Town Under Krai Jurisdiction is incorporated as Bolshoy Kamen Urban Okrug.

== Economy ==
Bolshoy Kamen is a monotown mostly specialized in engineering. Shipbuilding and repair works together with food industry and construction constitutes the basis of its economy. A large proportion of the town's population left during the 1990s, as the ship repair facilities operated almost at a standstill after the dissolution of the Soviet Union.

Most of the town's population is employed in the repair and construction of nuclear submarines. There are three banks and seven joint-venture companies, specializing in ships, shipping, and sea-fishing.

The town is connected with Vladivostok by road and by railway and is connected by a goods rail line to the Trans-Siberian Railway. Although the town is only around 40 kilometers (25 mi) in a straight line to Vladivostok, the road connection is about 130 kilometers (81 mi) around the coast.

There are plans to expand and redevelop the Zvezda shipyard.

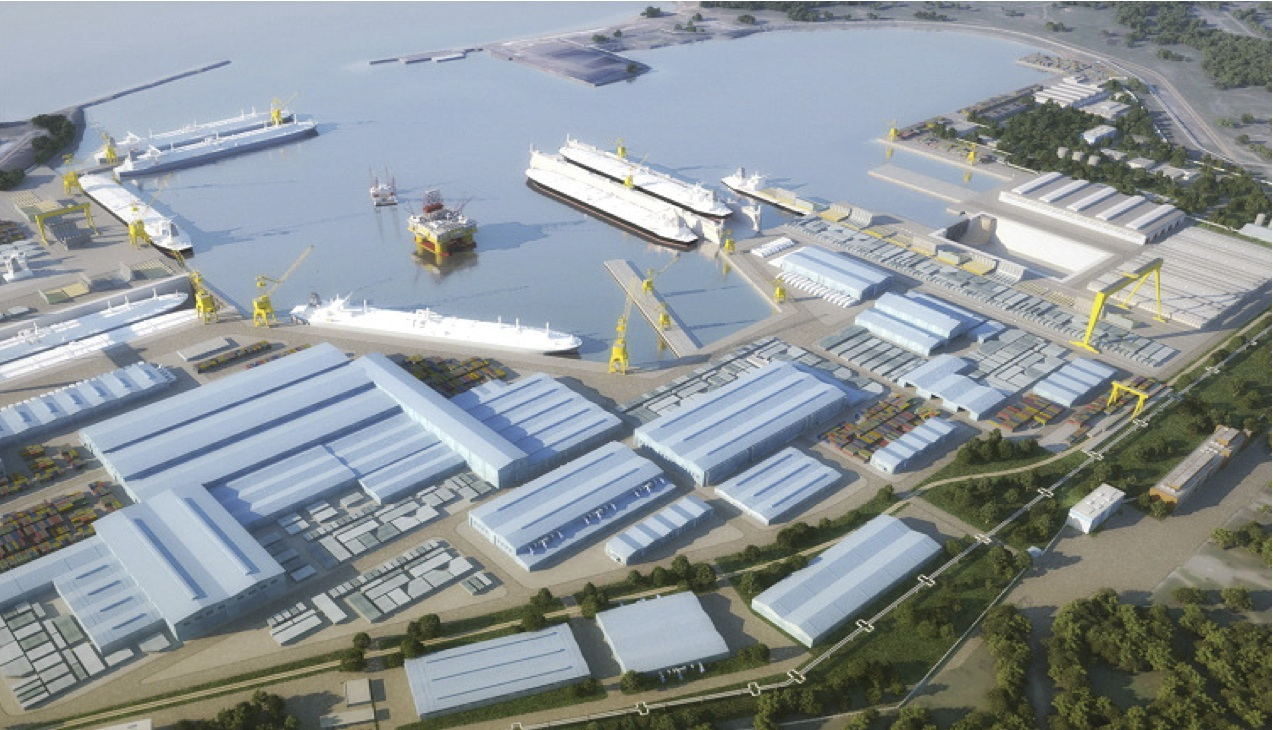
Model of Zvezda-D.S.M.E. shipyard's keyplan

== Climate ==
Climate data for Bolshoy Kamen
Month	Jan	Feb	Mar	Apr	May	Jun	Jul	Aug	Sep	Oct	Nov	Dec	Year
Mean daily maximum °C (°F)	−7.8 (18.0)	−4.7 (23.5)	2.4 (36.3)	9.9 (49.8)	15.3 (59.5)	17.8 (64.0)	22.1 (71.8)	24.3 (75.7)	20.6 (69.1)	14.0 (57.2)	4.0 (39.2)	−4.4 (24.1)	9.5 (49.0)
Daily mean °C (°F)	−11.7 (10.9)	−8.8 (16.2)	−1.7 (28.9)	5.5 (41.9)	10.7 (51.3)	14.3 (57.7)	18.8 (65.8)	21.1 (70.0)	16.8 (62.2)	9.8 (49.6)	0.2 (32.4)	−8.2 (17.2)	5.6 (42.0)
Mean daily minimum °C (°F)	−15.6 (3.9)	−12.8 (9.0)	−5.8 (21.6)	1.2 (34.2)	6.1 (43.0)	10.8 (51.4)	15.6 (60.1)	17.9 (64.2)	13.0 (55.4)	5.6 (42.1)	−3.6 (25.5)	−11.9 (10.6)	1.7 (35.1)
Average precipitation mm (inches)	12 (0.5)	16 (0.6)	23 (0.9)	47 (1.9)	64 (2.5)	90 (3.5)	104 (4.1)	136 (5.4)	115 (4.5)	62 (2.4)	34 (1.3)	19 (0.7)	722 (28.3)
Source: Climate-Data.org

== Notable people ==
- David Bedzhanyan, Russian weightlifter of Armenian descent
