= Oktyabrsky District, Primorsky Krai =

Oktyabrsky District Октябрьский район (Russian)
- District
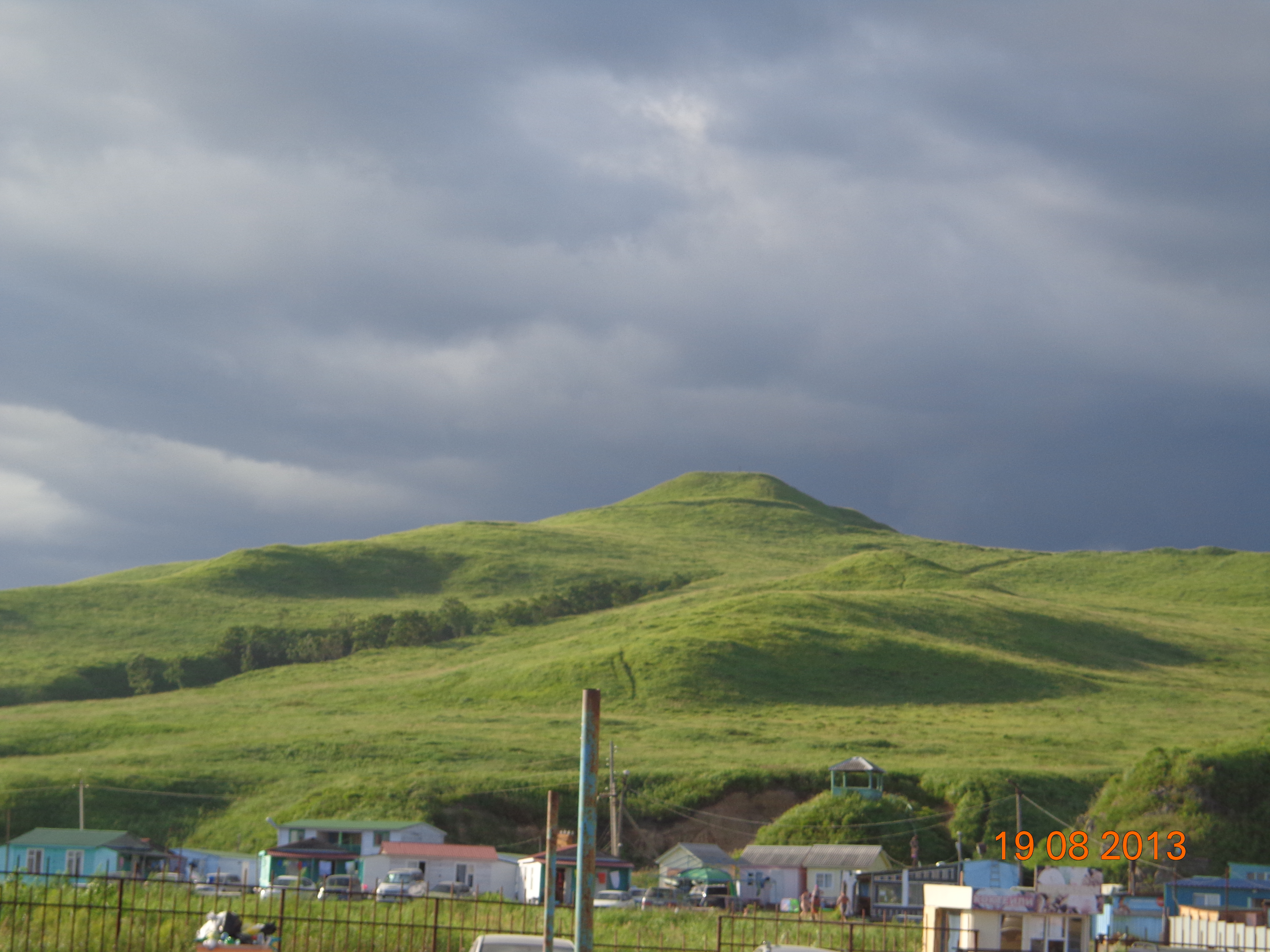
- Senkina Shapka Hill, a protected area in Oktyabrsky District

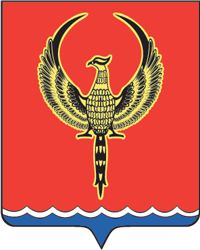
- Coat of arms
- Location of Oktyabrsky District in Primorsky Krai
- Coordinates: 43°57′N 131°38′E
- Country: Russia
- Federal subject: Primorsky Krai
- Administrative center: Pokrovka

Area
  - Total: 1,632.8 km^{2} (630.4 sq mi)

Population (2010 Census)
  - Total: 30,060
  - Density: 18.41/km^{2} (47.68/sq mi)
  - Urban: 21.3%
  - Rural: 78.7%

Administrative structure
  - Inhabited localities: 1 urban-type settlements, 21 rural localities

Municipal structure
  - Municipally incorporated as: Oktyabrsky Municipal District
  - Municipal divisions: 1 urban settlements, 1 rural settlements
- Time zone: UTC+10 (MSK+7)
- OKTMO ID: 05626000
- Website: http://mo.primorsky.ru/oktybrsky

Oktyabrsky District (Russian: Октя́брьский райо́н) is an administrative and municipal district (raion), one of the twenty-two in Primorsky Krai, Russia. It is located in the southwest of the krai. The area of the district is 1,632.8 square kilometers (630.4 sq mi). Its administrative center is the rural locality (a selo) of Pokrovka. Population: 30,060 (2010 census); 34,367 (2002 census); 39,973 (1989 Soviet census). The population of Pokrovka accounts for 34.5% of the district's total population.

== Notable residents ==
- Alexandra Kim (1885–1918), Korean revolutionary political activist, born in the Korean village of Sinelnikovo
- Valery Zorkin (born 1943), Chairman of the Constitutional Court of the Russian Federation, born in Konstantinovka
