= Shkotovsky District =

Shkotovsky District Шкотовский район (Russian)
- District
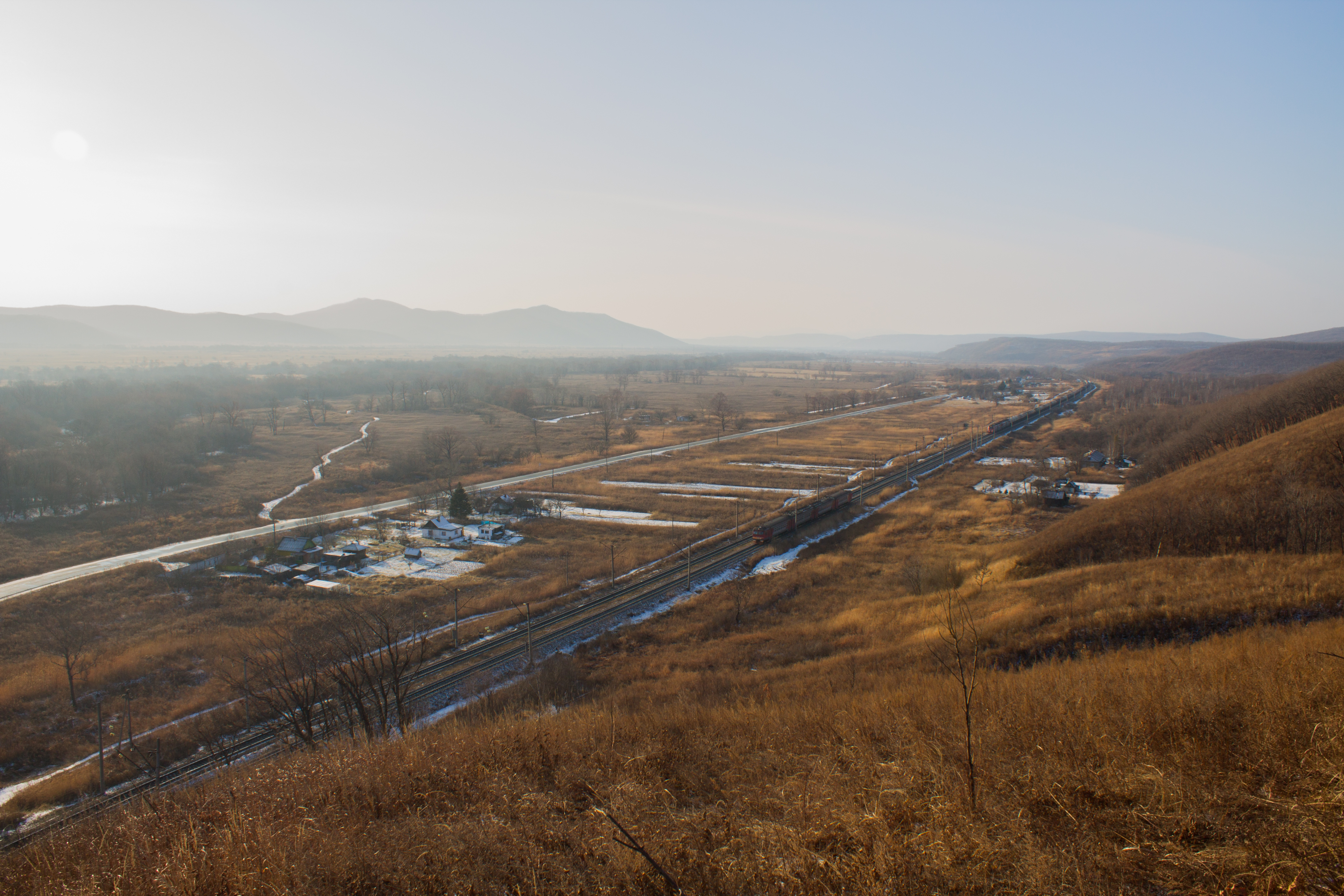
- Roads in Shkotovsky District

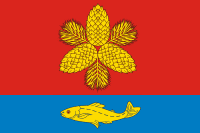
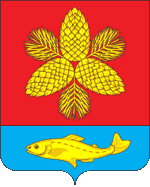
- Flag Coat of arms
- Location of Shkotovsky District in Primorsky Krai
- Coordinates: 43°07′N 132°22′E
- Country: Russia
- Federal subject: Primorsky Krai
- Established: 4 January 1926
- Administrative center: Smolyaninovo

Area
  - Total: 2,664.5 km^{2} (1,028.8 sq mi)

Population (2010 Census)
  - Total: 24,511
  - Density: 9.1991/km^{2} (23.826/sq mi)
  - Urban: 47.9%
  - Rural: 52.1%

Administrative structure
  - Inhabited localities: 2 urban-type settlements, 19 rural localities

Municipal structure
  - Municipally incorporated as: Shkotovsky Municipal District
  - Municipal divisions: 2 urban settlements, 5 rural settlements
- Time zone: UTC+10 (MSK+7)
- OKTMO ID: 05657000
- Website: http://mo.primorsky.ru/shkotovsky/

Shkotovsky District (Russian: Шко́товский райо́н) is an administrative and municipal district (raion), one of the twenty-two in Primorsky Krai, Russia. It is located in the south of the krai. The area of the district is 2,664.5 square kilometers (1,028.8 sq mi). Its administrative center is the urban locality (an urban-type settlement) of Smolyaninovo. Population: 24,511 (2010 census); 25,809 (2002 census); 111,460 (1989 Soviet census). The population of Smolyaninovo accounts for 27.4% of the district's total population.

== Etymology ==
Shkotovsky District is named for Nikolay Shkot, a war veteran of the Crimean War who participated in the Siege of Sevastopol, and later an early explorer of Primorsky Krai where he was one of the co-founders of Vladivostok.

== Notable residents ==
- Igor Klimov (born 1989 in Smolyaninovo), footballer
- Andrei Kolkoutine (born 1957 in Smolyaninovo), artist
