= Khorolsky District =

Khorolsky District Хорольский район (Russian)
- District
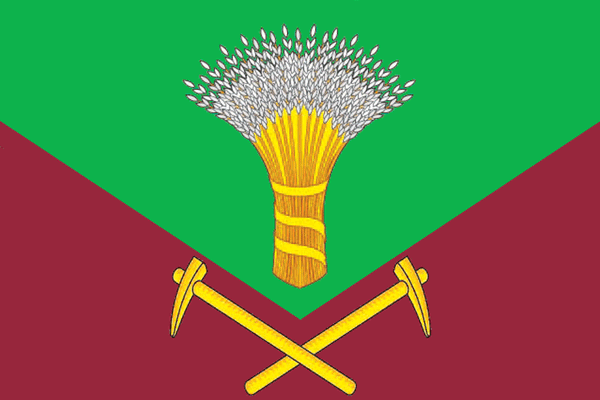
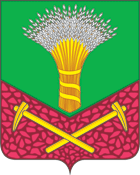
- Flag Coat of arms
- Location of Khorolsky District in Primorsky Krai
- Coordinates: 44°26′N 132°05′E
- Country: Russia
- Federal subject: Primorsky Krai
- Established: January 25, 1935
- Administrative center: Khorol

Area
  - Total: 1,968.6 km^{2} (760.1 sq mi)

Population (2010 Census)
  - Total: 30,281
  - Density: 15.382/km^{2} (39.839/sq mi)
  - Urban: 30.1%
  - Rural: 69.9%

Administrative structure
  - Inhabited localities: 1 urban-type settlements, 24 rural localities

Municipal structure
  - Municipally incorporated as: Khorolsky Municipal District
  - Municipal divisions: 1 urban settlements, 3 rural settlements
- Time zone: UTC+10 (MSK+7)
- OKTMO ID: 05650000
- Website: http://khorol.ru

Khorolsky District (Russian: Хоро́льский райо́н) is an administrative and municipal district (raion), one of the twenty-two in Primorsky Krai, Russia. It is located in the southwest of the krai. The area of the district is 1,968.6 square kilometers (760.1 sq mi). Its administrative center is the rural locality (a selo) of Khorol. Population: 30,281 (2010 census); 34,555 (2002 census); 43,557 (1989 Soviet census). The population of Khorol accounts for 35.9% of the district's total population.

== History ==
The district was established on January 25, 1935.
