= Pogranichny District =

Pogranichny District Пограничный район (Russian)
- District
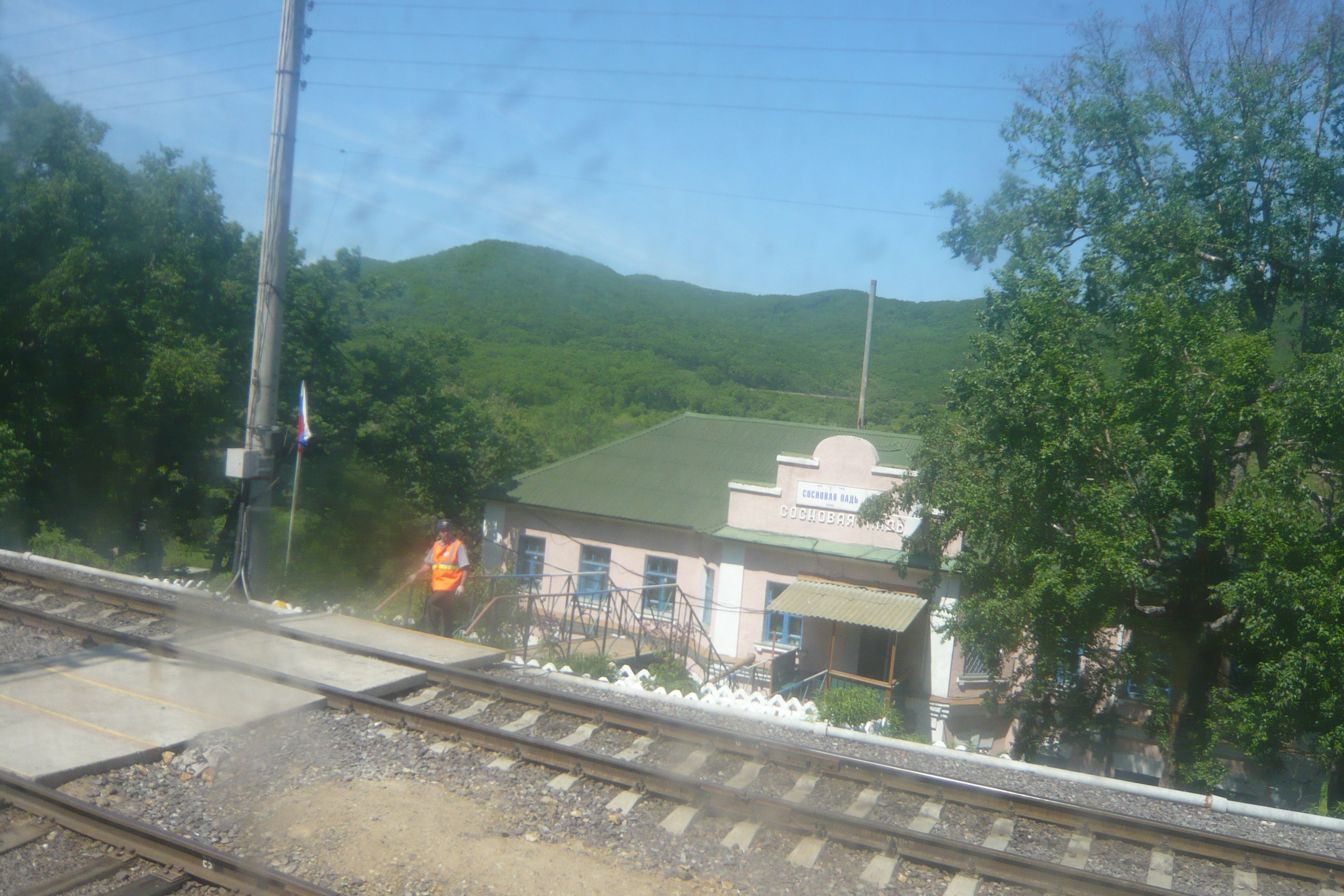
- A rail crossing in Pogranichny in Pogranichny District

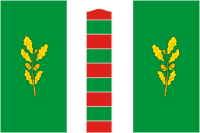
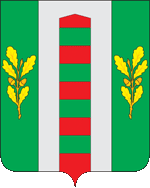
- Flag Coat of arms
- Location of Pogranichny District in Primorsky Krai
- Coordinates: 44°25′N 131°23′E
- Country: Russia
- Federal subject: Primorsky Krai
- Established: 1926
- Administrative center: Pogranichny

Area
  - Total: 3,750.0 km^{2} (1,447.9 sq mi)

Population (2010 Census)
  - Total: 23,492
  - Density: 6.2645/km^{2} (16.225/sq mi)
  - Urban: 43.8%
  - Rural: 56.3%

Administrative structure
  - Inhabited localities: 1 urban-type settlements, 17 rural localities

Municipal structure
  - Municipally incorporated as: Pogranichny Municipal District
  - Municipal divisions: 1 urban settlements, 2 rural settlements
- Time zone: UTC+10 (MSK+7)
- OKTMO ID: 05632000
- Website: http://www.admin.pogran.com

Pogranichny District (Russian: Пограни́чный райо́н; Chinese: 波格拉尼奇內區) is an administrative and municipal district (raion), one of the twenty-two in Primorsky Krai, Russia. It is located in the southwest of the krai. The area of the district is 3,750.0 square kilometers (1,447.9 sq mi). Its administrative center is the urban locality (an urban-type settlement) of Pogranichny. Population: 23,492 (2010 census); 25,761 (2002 census); 26,604 (1989 Soviet census). The population of the administrative center accounts for 43.8% of the district's total population.

== History ==
The district was established in 1926.

== Notable residents ==
- Ruslan Gordiyenko (born 1995 in Pogranichny), football player
