= Partizansk =

Town in Primorsky Krai, Russia

Partizansk Партизанск
- Town
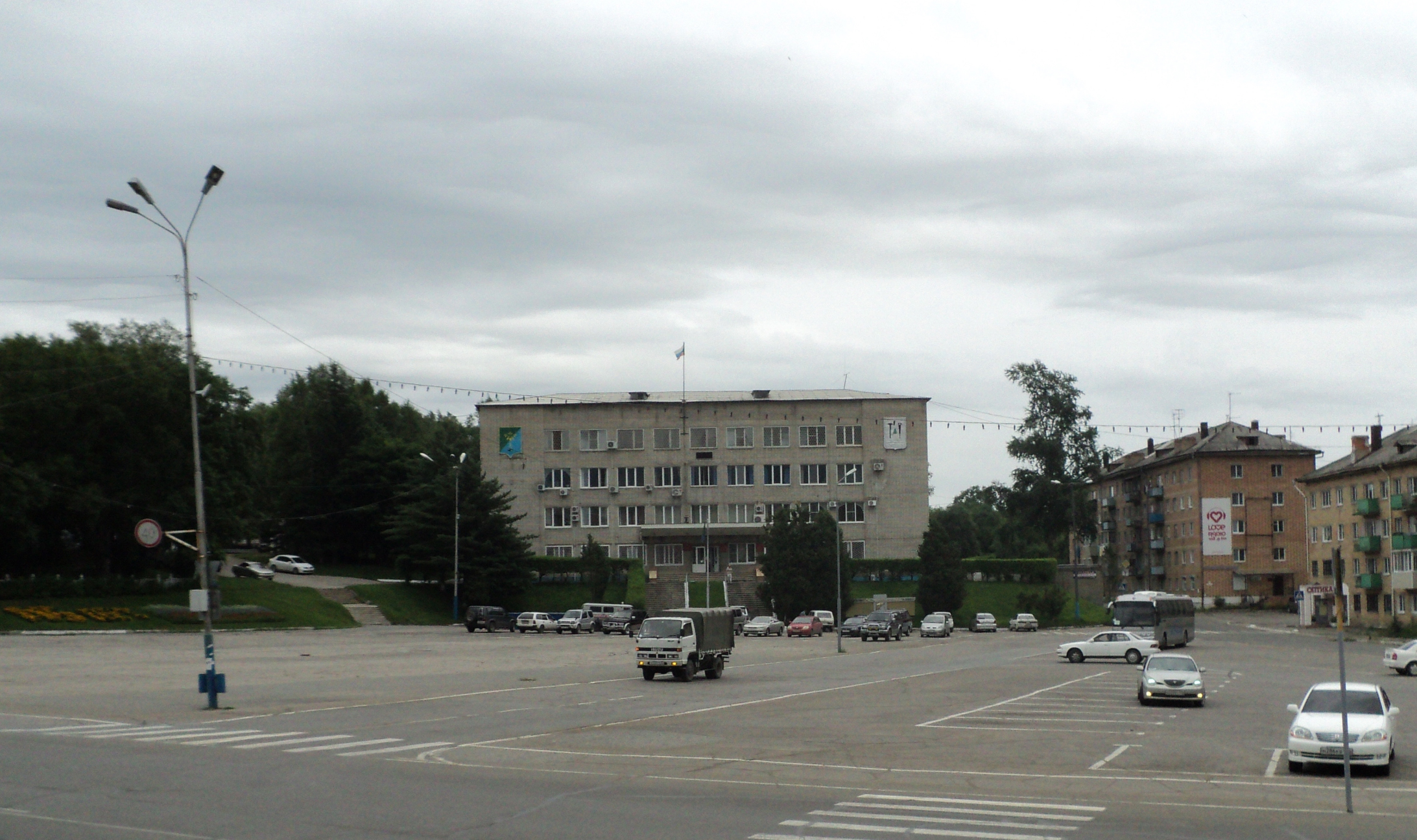
- Partizansk town center

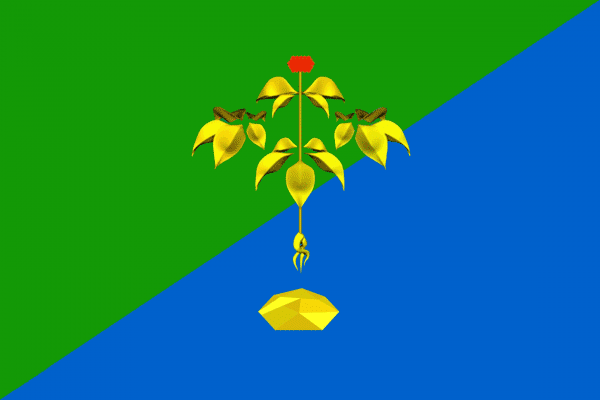
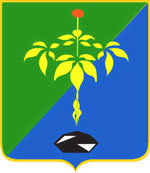
- Flag Coat of arms
- Interactive map of Partizansk
- Location of Partizansk Partizansk (Primorsky Krai)
- Coordinates: 43°07′N 133°07′E
- Country: Russia
- Federal subject: Primorsky Krai
- Founded: 1896
- Town status since: 1932

Government
  - Head: Alexey Neshchadim
- Elevation: 140 m (460 ft)

Population (2010 Census)
  - Total: 38,659
  - Estimate (2025): 32,635 (−15.6%)

Administrative status
  - Subordinated to: Partizansk Town Under Krai Jurisdiction
  - Capital of: Partizansk Town Under Krai Jurisdiction

Municipal status
  - Urban okrug: Partizansky Urban Okrug
  - Capital of: Partizansky Urban Okrug
- Time zone: UTC+10 (MSK+7)
- Postal code: 692864
- Dialing codes: +7 692851–692854, 692856, 692858, 692860, 692861, 692864, 692867–692869
- OKTMO ID: 05717000001
- Website: web.archive.org/web/20141218035213/http://partizansk.org/

Partizansk (Russian: Партиза́нск) is a town in Primorsky Krai, Russia, located on a spur of the Sikhote-Alin Mountains, about 170 kilometers (110 mi) east of Vladivostok, the administrative center of the krai. As of the 2010 census, the population is population 38,659.

== Names ==
The town was formerly known as Suchan (Chinese: 蘇城; pinyin: Sūchéng - literally "City of Su" or Chinese: 蘇昌; pinyin: Sūchāng), but its Russian name was changed to Partizansk in 1972 during a general campaign of cleansing Chinese toponyms in Russian Far East.

== Geography ==
A number of creeks flow through the town into the nearby Partizanskaya River, previously known as the Suchan.

== History ==
In the late 19th century, the Vladivostok-based Russian Pacific Fleet was in deep need of a source of coal. The Department of Mines sent a geological expedition to the area south of Ussuriysk, working there from 1888 to 1893. Coal was found, which could be mined and sent to Nakhodka for the needs of the Fleet. In 1896, the Department of Mines made a large order for coal from the Suchan River area, and a settlement for miners was founded. The settlement was originally named Suchansky Rudnik, meaning mining pit of Suchan.

Around this time, Korean settlers moved out of the northern part of the Korean peninsula to avoid famine, with some settling in Partizansk. Pre-1937 Korean settlers to Russia and the Soviet Union are known as Koryo-saram. The Koreans called the area Such'ŏng (Korean: 수청). The area eventually become a hub for Korean independence activism against Japan's colonization of Korea. Korean militants such as Han Ch'ang-kŏl (한창걸; 韓昌傑) resisted Japan from the nearby mountains. Notable Korean socialist Pak Chin-sun was born in this area. The Koreans were eventually forced to migrate to Central Asia in 1937.

Later in 1896, more detailed prospecting was organized in Suchan, and commercial operations started at around that time. Suchan miners were living in dug-outs, cabins, and tents, and living conditions were awful. Only in 1900, when forty-six highly qualified miners arrived, construction of the mine #1 and of ten houses started. Government-owned coal mines were also established at that time. The first migrants started to move to Suchan.

The government often neglected to maintain good living conditions for Suchan workers. For the period of 1896–1922, only one two-story house was built. Suchan itself was just a group of several badly planned mine settlements. In 1905 and 1906, state schools were opened and a hospital for fifty people was built.

In the period of 1905–1914, several new mines were opened in Suchan. Wooden barracks and individual houses also appeared. Construction was carried out without proper planning, with each artel building a barrack for its workers. Some of those buildings remain intact to the present day. The founders of Suchansky Rudnik had not carried out much work up to 1914. After the beginning of World War I, development completely stopped. Many workers were called up for military service, extraction of coal reduced greatly, and construction works were cut down. Difficult years of need and hardship started.

In 1917, there were eleven mines which annually extracted up to 300,000 tons of coal. In 1918–1922, during the Russian Civil War, the supporters of the Bolsheviks conducted an active partisan struggle in the region. After the establishment of Soviet authority in Primorye, coal remained the region's main production.

After 1922, restoration of old mines and building of new ones started. Spread settlements merged into one large locality. Construction of multi-story buildings began. At this time great attention was paid to cultural development of the settlement. In 1917, the People's House was built, which later transformed into a club of miners. It became a cultural center of the settlement. In 1926, a club for 350 people was built near mine #10. In 1932, a club for 200 people near mine #20 and for 250 people at timber plant were built. In 1933, the largest Palace of Culture in Primorye with a hall for 1,200 people started functioning.

Town status was granted in 1932, and the name was shortened to Suchan. Soon after that Suchan was renamed Gamarnik (Гама́рник), after revolutionary commissar Yan Gamarnik; however, the name reverted to Suchan after Gamarnik's suicide (due to possible arrest during the Great Purge) in 1937.

The town was given its present name in 1972, when the cleansing of Chinese names in Primorsky Krai took place. The nearby Suchan River, from which the town had taken its name, was renamed the Partizanskaya.

In 2005, it was reported that a Korean community of around ten families lived in the city, returnees from the deportation.

== Administrative and municipal status ==
Within the framework of administrative divisions, it is, together with eleven rural localities, incorporated as Partizansk Town Under Krai Jurisdiction—an administrative unit with the status equal to that of the districts. As a municipal division, Partizansk Town Under Krai Jurisdiction is incorporated as Partizansky Urban Okrug.

== Economy and infrastructure ==
The economy of the town and its surrounding area remains largely reliant on coal mining; however, the industry is currently in decline, with the previous coal reserves largely exhausted. Previous machine-building, chemical and pharmaceutical works have also been closed.

Timber production has grown in importance in recent years. Light industry also prospers, with a garment factory, a tannery, a food-processing plant, and a brewery currently operating.

The 1970s witnessed some great effort in modernizing the town's industrial sector, crowned with building a power station, which was later named after the town. Thirty years later, the Partizansk Power Station was renovated, and a new generator was installed to boost the output. Despite being one of the less important stations in the energy grid of the krai, especially with the reference to its minor share in the krai's energy output, Partizansk Power Station has a vital role in supplying with electricity the town and the close vicinity.

The town lies on the branch of the Trans-Siberian Railway leading to Nakhodka; this section of the railroad was completed in 1935.

== Tourism ==
A coal deposit in Oleny Klyuch (near mine #1) was for the first time mentioned by Vasily Margaritov, a member of the Geographic Society of Amur Krai. This place is now called "The First Coal" (as it was the first mine in the area). Today, the mine is no longer in operation, and is commemorated with a cast-iron sign placed there in 1932. The sign contains the following text: "In 1883 the first coal was found here. Here the mine begins."

The nearby area also includes a number of cliffs and waterfalls.

== Notable residents ==
- Valentin Zamotaykin (1939–1987), Soviet Olympic sailor

== Climate ==
Partizansk has a four-season humid continental climate. Its climate contains vast temperature differences between seasons, in spite of its relatively low latitude and position near the Pacific Ocean. It has slightly warmer summers than Vladivostok due to its inland position, whereas winters are similar in both locations, largely but not completely unaffected by any maritime moderation. The cold temperatures for the latitude are due to the Siberian High's influence. The climate features wet and humid summers as well as dry and snow-light winters.

Climate data for Partizansk
Month	Jan	Feb	Mar	Apr	May	Jun	Jul	Aug	Sep	Oct	Nov	Dec	Year
Record high °C (°F)	5.7 (42.3)	10.6 (51.1)	17.9 (64.2)	31.1 (88.0)	31.0 (87.8)	33.5 (92.3)	38.0 (100.4)	38.0 (100.4)	32.2 (90.0)	27.7 (81.9)	19.2 (66.6)	9.0 (48.2)	38.0 (100.4)
Mean daily maximum °C (°F)	−7.7 (18.1)	−4.0 (24.8)	2.8 (37.0)	11.9 (53.4)	18.2 (64.8)	21.4 (70.5)	24.5 (76.1)	25.4 (77.7)	20.8 (69.4)	13.7 (56.7)	2.9 (37.2)	−5.4 (22.3)	10.4 (50.7)
Daily mean °C (°F)	−12.5 (9.5)	−9.0 (15.8)	−2.2 (28.0)	5.9 (42.6)	11.7 (53.1)	15.6 (60.1)	19.5 (67.1)	20.3 (68.5)	14.8 (58.6)	7.7 (45.9)	−2.0 (28.4)	−9.9 (14.2)	5.0 (41.0)
Mean daily minimum °C (°F)	−17.6 (0.3)	−14.6 (5.7)	−7.9 (17.8)	0.0 (32.0)	5.5 (41.9)	10.5 (50.9)	15.4 (59.7)	15.8 (60.4)	8.9 (48.0)	1.7 (35.1)	−7.3 (18.9)	−14.9 (5.2)	−0.3 (31.5)
Record low °C (°F)	−30.9 (−23.6)	−32.5 (−26.5)	−22.8 (−9.0)	−12.2 (10.0)	−2.0 (28.4)	0.0 (32.0)	1.0 (33.8)	1.7 (35.1)	−5.0 (23.0)	−14.1 (6.6)	−20.0 (−4.0)	−28.0 (−18.4)	−32.5 (−26.5)
Average precipitation mm (inches)	12.8 (0.50)	15.0 (0.59)	24.0 (0.94)	43.0 (1.69)	58.5 (2.30)	106.0 (4.17)	112.6 (4.43)	110.0 (4.33)	106.7 (4.20)	46.0 (1.81)	29.1 (1.15)	17.3 (0.68)	681.0 (26.81)
Average relative humidity (%)	55	54	56	60	69	77	85	81	74	62	57	56	65
Average dew point °C (°F)	−20 (−4)	−17 (1)	−10 (14)	−3 (27)	6 (43)	12 (54)	17 (63)	17 (63)	11 (52)	1 (34)	−9 (16)	−17 (1)	−1 (30)
Mean daily sunshine hours	7.2	7.6	7.5	7.8	8.9	8.3	7.8	7.2	8.3	8.3	6.0	6.0	7.6
Source 1:
Source 2: Time and Date (dewpoints 2005-2015) Weather Atlas (sun hours)
