= Vladivostok Time =

Time zone in Russia (UTC+10)

- Time zone

UTC offset
- VLAT: UTC+10:00

Current time
- 12:29, 6 January 2026 VLAT [refresh]

Observance of DST
- DST is not observed in this time zone.

Time in Russia: KALT / Kaliningrad Time / UTC+2 / (MSK−1); MSK / Moscow Time / UTC+3 / (MSK±0); SAMT / Samara Time / UTC+4 / (MSK+1); YEKT / Yekaterinburg Time / UTC+5 / (MSK+2); OMST / Omsk Time / UTC+6 / (MSK+3); KRAT / Krasnoyarsk Time / UTC+7 / (MSK+4); IRKT / Irkutsk Time / UTC+8 / (MSK+5); YAKT / Yakutsk Time / UTC+9 / (MSK+6); VLAT / Vladivostok Time / UTC+10 / (MSK+7); MAGT / Magadan Time / UTC+11 / (MSK+8); PETT / Kamchatka Time / UTC+12 / (MSK+9)

Vladivostok Time (VLAT) (Russian: владивостокское время, vladivostokskoye vremya), is a time zone in Russia, named after the city of Vladivostok. It is ten hours ahead of UTC (UTC+10:00) and seven hours ahead of Moscow Time (MSK+7).

On 27 March 2011, Russia moved to year-round daylight saving time. Instead of switching between UTC+10:00 in winter and UTC+11:00 in summer, Vladivostok Time became fixed at UTC+11:00 until 2014, when it was reset back to UTC+10:00 year-round.

== Areas on Vladivostok Time ==
- Khabarovsk Krai
- Central parts of the Sakha Republic (Oymyakonsky District, Ust-Yansky District and Verkhoyansky District)
- The Jewish Autonomous Oblast
- Primorsky Krai

Between 26 October 2014 and 24 April 2016 Vladivostok Time was used in Magadan Oblast and Sakhalin.

== Cities on Vladivostok Time ==
Cities and towns with more than 100,000 inhabitants using Vladivostok Time:

- Artyom
- Khabarovsk
- Komsomolsk-on-Amur
- Nakhodka
- Ussuriysk
- Vladivostok

== IANA time zone database ==
In the zone.tab of the IANA time zone database, the zones with the same current offset are:

c.c.	Coordinates	Timezone name	Comments	UTC offset
RU	+4310+13156	Asia/Vladivostok	MSK+07 – Amur River	+10:00
RU	+643337+1431336	Asia/Ust-Nera	MSK+07 – Oymyakonsky	+10:00

== See also ==
- Time in Russia
