= Lazovsky Nature Reserve =

Nature reserve in Primorsky Krai, Russia

Lazovski Nature Reserve
- Russian: Лазовский заповедник (Also: Lazovsky)
- IUCN category Ia (strict nature reserve)
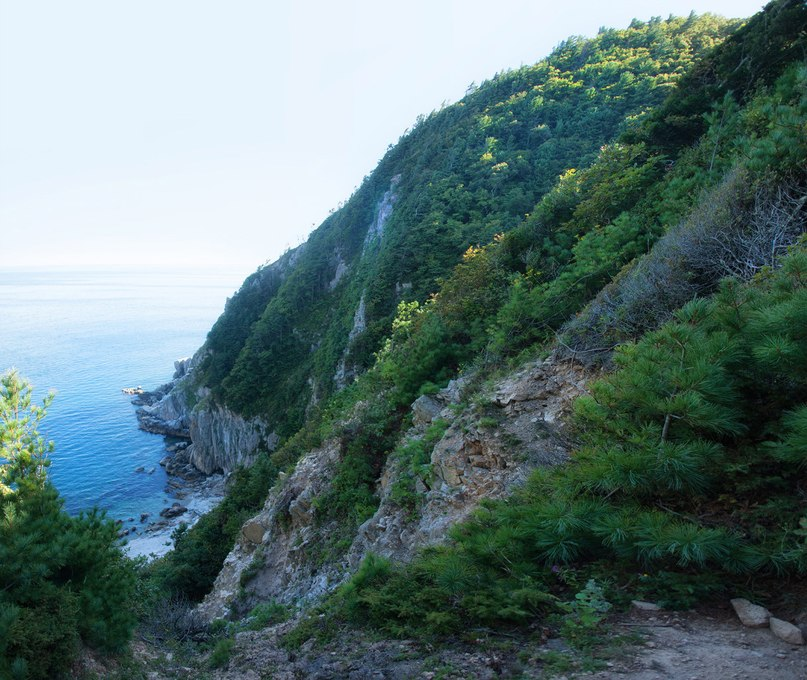
- Lazovski Zapovednik

- Location within Russia
- Location: Primorsky Krai
- Nearest city: Vladivostok
- Coordinates: 43°14′0″N 133°24′0″E
- Area: 120,989 hectares (298,970 acres; 467 sq mi)
- Established: 1957
- Governing body: Ministry of Natural Resources and Environment (Russia)
- Website: http://www.lazovzap.ru/

Lazovski Nature Reserve (Russian: Лазовский заповедник Lazovskiy zapavyednik) (also Lazovsky) is a Russian 'zapovednik' (strict ecological reserve) that sits on the southeastern slopes of the Sikhote-Alin mountain range, down to the coast of the Sea of Japan, in Primorsky Krai in the Russian Far East about 150 km due east of Vladivostok. The reserve is 95% forested, with the largest stand of yew trees in the Russian Far East, and has been the subject of scientific study since the 1800s for its rich communities of plants and animals found in the transition mountain to maritime zones in a temperate, rainy forest. Lazonvsky Reserve contains more species than any other reserve in the Russian Far East, and 60% of the species in the Priomorky region are found on the reserve. It is jointly managed with the Zov Tigra National Park, located about 50 km to the northwest. The reserve is situated entirely within the Lazovsky District of Primorsky Krai. The reserve was created in 1957, and covers an area of 120,989 ha (467.14 sq mi).

== Topography ==
The reserve is bounded by the valleys of the Kyevka and Tchornaya Rivers, as they stream from the mountain ridge that runs along the northwest border, down to the sea to the east. Approximately 50 km of the territory is coastline on the Sea of Japan, with rocky character and cliffs that reach to 100 meters above the water. The boundaries also contain two small forested islands, Petrov and Belzov. Average altitude is 500–700 feet, with the highest peaks at 1,400 meters. Slopes are steep, typically 20 to 25%. There are few lakes, and rivers are generally non-navigable. The rivers and streams are important salmon spawning grounds.

Lazovsky Zapovednik to the SW, and Zov Tigra ("Call of the Tiger") National Park to the NE.

== Climate and ecoregion ==
Lazovski is located in the Ussuri broadleaf and mixed forests ecoregion. Unlike most temperate forest ecoregions, the levels of biodiversity and endemism are high in the Ussur broadleaf and mixed forest ecoregion due to the close proximity of multiple climate zones and variety of terrain. The forests in this ecoregion are typically Manchurian ash and Japanese elm in the lowlands, Korean pine and broadleaf forests in the middle elevations, and fir and spruce up to the subalpine levels.

The climate of Lazovsky is Humid continental climate, cool summer (Köppen climate classification (Dwb)). This climate is characterized by high variation in temperature, both daily and seasonally; with dry winters and cool summers. The Zapovedny Ridge runs across the middle; the northern extent of the reserve has a more continental climate, the southern extent more maritime.

== Flora and fauna ==
The reserve has three altitude zones of forest: Broadleaf forest of mostly oak at the lower levels, mixed pine-broadleaf forest at the middle elevation, and dark taiga (coniferous forest) above 1,100 meters in the subalpine levels. Parts of the reserve have escaped commercial logging and have old-growth stands of trees. In the mixed forest zone, the dominant species of pine and oak are joined by over 60 other species. Undergrowth is often dense bushes of hazel, Lespedeza, roses and viburnum. Scientists in the reserve have recorded the 1,284 species of vascular plants, 285 species of mosses, 685 species of algae, 407 of lichens 407, and 1,189 of fungi. Of these species, 168 are endemic or rare.

Birds are especially well-represented, with 344 species having been recorded, and 140 species are nesting. The endangered Amur tiger is resident in the reserve.

== Ecotourism ==
As a strict nature reserve, the Lazovsky Reserve is mostly closed to the general public, although scientists and those with 'environmental education' purposes can make arrangements with park management for visits. There are four 'ecotourist' routes in the reserve, however, that are open to the public, but the number of visits is limited each year, and visits must be made in groups. The reserve operates a nature museum outside of the boundaries in the village of Lazo.

== See also ==
- List of Russian Nature Reserves (class 1a 'zapovedniks')
- National parks of Russia
- Protected areas of Russia
