= Kabarga =

Settlement in Russia

Kabarga Кабарга́
- Interactive map of Kabarga
- Location of Kabarga Kabarga (Russia)
- Coordinates: 45°18′50″N 133°22′00″E
- Country: Russia
- Federal subject: Primorsky Krai
- Administrative district: Far Eastern
- )

Kabarga (Russian: Кабарга́, literally "Moschidae"), known until 1972 as Kaoul (Russian: Ка́уль), is a settlement classified as a railway station in the Russian Far East. It is located within the urban district of Lesozavodsk in Primorsky Krai. In 2010, its population was 39.

== Geography ==
=== Location ===
Kabarga is a village in Primorsky Krai, a southern region of the Russian Far East within the Far Eastern Federal District. It is located 270 km north-northeast of Vladivostok, the administrative center of both the krai and the district, and approximately 6,300 km east of Moscow. Kabarga is one of twenty-two localities in the urban district of Lesozavodsk, whose administrative center is the town of Lesozavodsk, 17 km to the north. (Note: Distances are straight-line or great-circle distances.)

The village is situated in the Ussuri region, which encompasses the basin of the Ussuri River, a right tributary of the Amur River. It is crossed by the Kabarga River (formerly known as Kaoul until 1972), a right tributary of the Ussuri.

== History ==
The locality was established in 1895 as a village along the Kaoul passing loop of the Ussuri Railway, a section of which had opened to rail traffic in 1894.

During the Russian Civil War, the Kaoul junction was repeatedly involved in military operations. The settlement, along with the railway, changed control multiple times between opposing forces. After Soviet forces briefly held the area, they were expelled by the Czechoslovak Legion from the heights of Kaoul on 1 August 1918. On 2 August 1918, V. Urbanovich, the commander of the central section of the Ussuri Front of the Red forces, was killed at Kaoul. According to research conducted in 2021, during this engagement, 43 Czechoslovak soldiers were reported missing, and over 200 individuals were killed by Red Guards.

In April 1922, Japanese forces recaptured the passage from the Red Guards during the Siberian intervention. Following the start of the Japanese withdrawal from Primorye in September 1922, control of Kaoul alternated between the Revolutionary People's Army of the Far Eastern Republic and the Zemstvo Army, the provisional government of Priamur.

In 1972, as part of a broader renaming of geographical features in the Russian Far East, the village and railway station were renamed Kabarga, after the river of the same name.

== Demographics ==
Censuses (*) and population estimates:

Demographic trends
1915	1926*	2002*	2007	2010*	-
517	477	47	55	39	-

== Transportation ==
The village is served by the Kabarga railway station on the Ussuri Railway, the easternmost section of the Trans-Siberian Railway, with connections to Ruzhino and Vladivostok. Road access is provided by regional road 05K-174, which connects to regional road 05K-195, linking Lesozavodsk to the federal highway A370, running between Khabarovsk to the north and Vladivostok to the south.

== Culture ==
On Kaoul Hill, there is a monument dedicated to the soldiers and commanders of the Ussuri Front, commemorating their engagement in 1918. The monument was established in 1977 through the initiative of the director of Secondary School No. 1 in Lesozavodsk and a local historian.

== See also ==
- Ussuri krai
