= Lazo, Lazovsky District, Primorsky Krai =

Rural locality in Lazovsky District, Primorsky Krai, Russia

Coordinates: 43°22′49″N 133°53′52″E

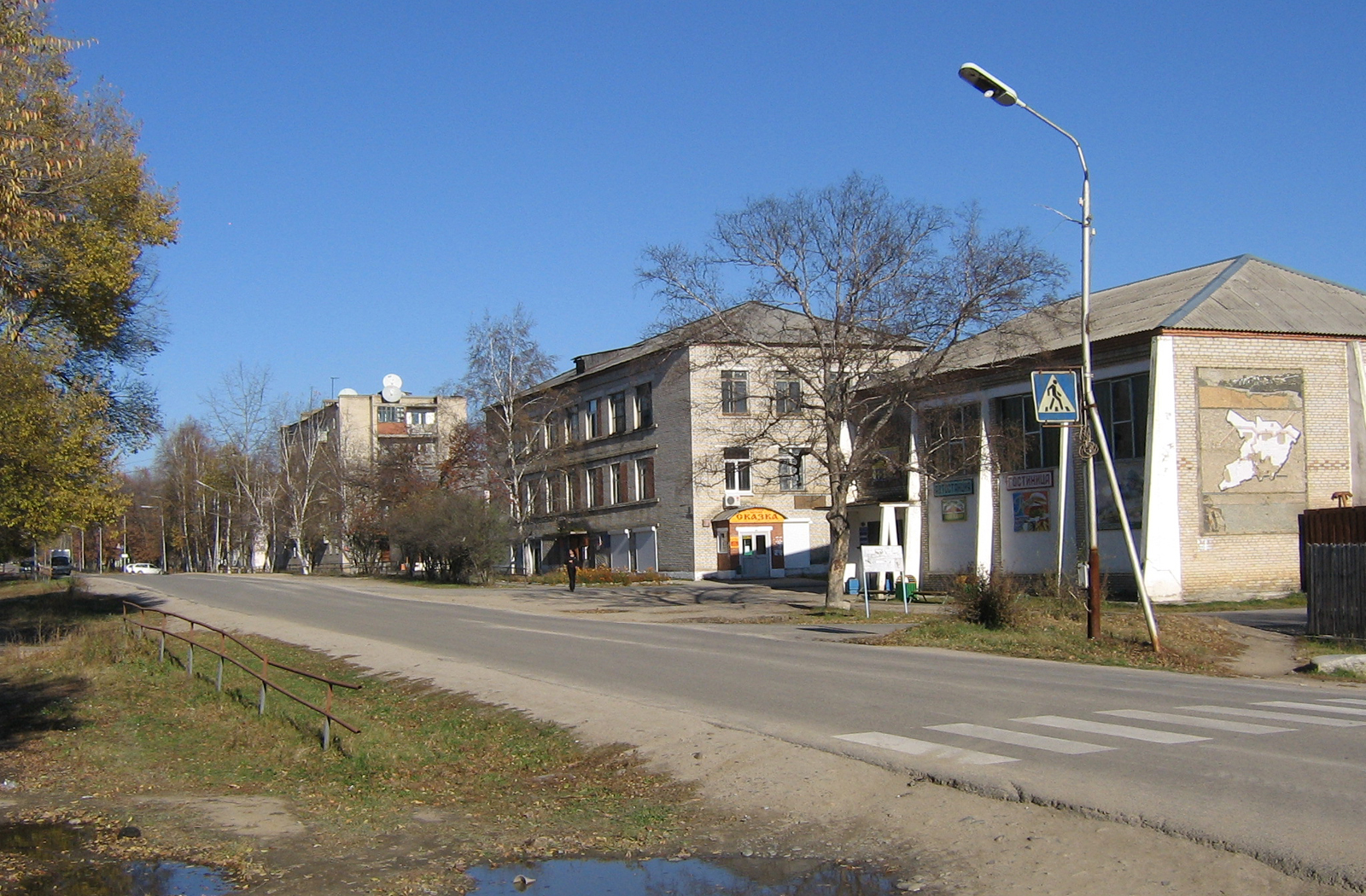
Lazo town

Lazo (Russian: Лазо́) is a village in the Russian Maritime Province of Primorsky Krai in the Russian Far East.

== History ==
The village was founded and named Monomakh Slobidka (Мономахова Слободка) in 1907 by settlers from Bryansk and Chernihiv. In 1933 it was renamed Vangou (Вангоу).

On 26 August 1949, by a decree of the Presidium of the Supreme Soviet, the village was renamed again, now becoming Lazo (Лазо) in honour of the revolutionary hero Sergey Lazo (1894 - 1920). At the same time the Sokolov District in Primorski Krai was renamed as the "Lazovsky District".

== Climate ==
Winters are generally cold and dry with the prevailing winds coming from the continent. In Summer the prevailing winds are from the sea and the climate becomes hot and humid.

== National park ==
On 2 July 2007 the administrative head office for the Zov Tigra National Park was established in Lazo, at Lenin Street 23. The visitor center and museum associated with the park are located at Tsentral'naya Ulitsa, 56.
