= 135th Motor Rifle Division =

Russian motorized infantry brigade

135th Motor Rifle Division (1960–1989) 130th Machine Gun Artillery Division (1989–2009) 245th Weapons and Equipment Storage Base (2009–present)
- Active: 1960–present
- Country: Soviet Union (1960–1991); Russia (1992–present)
- Branch: Soviet Army (1960–1991); Russian Ground Forces (1992–present)
- Type: Motorized Infantry (former); Storage Base (present)
- Garrison/HQ: Lesozavodsk

The 135th Motor Rifle Division was a mechanized infantry division of the Soviet Army during the Cold War. The division was formed in 1960 as a mobilization division in Luhansk. It became a regular division in 1968 and was transferred to Lesozavodsk. In 1989, it was renamed the 130th Machine Gun Artillery Division (Military Unit Number 92910) and continued to serve in the Russian Ground Forces. It was reduced to the 245th Weapons and Equipment Storage Base in 2009.

== History ==
On 22 November 1960, the 135th Motor Rifle Division was activated as a mobilization division in Luhansk. It was co-located with the 4th Guards Motor Rifle Division. In April 1968, the division became a regular unit and was transferred to Lesozavodsk as a result of increased Sino-Soviet tensions.

The division's 199th Motor Rifle Regiment fought in the Damansky Island incident in March 1969 during the Sino-Soviet border conflict, when they were sent into the fight on 15 March to prevent Chinese capture of the island. The 199th had already been deployed ostensibly for exercises at the end of February 1969 as the conflict escalated and on March 2 was ordered to advance to Damansky Island. As the Chinese threaten to overwhelm the border guards, the regiment was committed to battle on 15 March. The 199th remained on the border until the end of March and departed only after the Chinese incursion attempts had ceased. Junior sergeant Vladimir Orekhov of the regiment's 5th company was posthumously made a Hero of the Soviet Union for his actions in the battle. The conflict was classified as a border conflict and the participation of the regular Soviet Army in it kept secret until the 1990s, and thus Army soldiers who participated did not automatically receive veteran status.

During the Cold War, the division was maintained at 65% strength. On 1 October 1989, the division became the 130th Machine Gun Artillery Division. The 199th Motorized Rifle Regiment was disbanded and replaced by the 365th Machine Gun Artillery Regiment. In 1994, the 365th Machine Gun Artillery Regiment became the 199th Motorized Rifle Regiment. The division was reduced to the 245th Weapons and Equipment Storage Base under the 2009 Russian military reforms. The base stores equipment planned to be used to form the 93rd Motor Rifle Brigade in event of mobilization. According to 2017 open-source data from milkavkaz, the storage base contains 18 BM-21 Grad, 36 152mm 2S1 Gvozdika, 18 120 mm 2S12 Sani, six 100 mm MT-12 Rapira, 18 9P149 Shturm-S, six BM 9A34(35) Strela-10, 18 57 mm AZP S-60, six ZSU-23-4 Shilka, and 41 T-72.

== Composition ==
In 1988, the 135th Motor Rifle Division was composed of the following units.

- 199th Motorized Rifle Regiment (Lazo)
- 469th Motorized Rifle Regiment (Filino, Primorskiy Kray)
- 472nd Motorized Rifle Regiment (Lesozavodsk, Primorskiy Kray)
- 122nd Tank Regiment (Koltsevoye, Primorskiy Kray)
- 378th Artillery Regiment (Panteleymonovka, Primorskiy Kray)
- 1135th Anti-Aircraft Missile Regiment (Koltsevoye, Primorskiy Kray)
- 17th Separate Missile Battalion (Panteleymonovka, Primorskiy Kray)
- 81st Separate Anti-Tank Artillery Battalion (Panteleymonovka, Primorskiy Kray)
- 131st Separate Reconnaissance Battalion (Lazo, Primorskiy Kray)
- 225th Separate Engineer-Sapper Battalion (Lazo, Primorskiy Kray)
- 354th Separate Communications Battalion (Lesozavodsk, Primorskiy Kray)
- 366th Separate Chemical Defence Company (Panteleymonovka, Primorskiy Kray)
- 204th Separate Equipment Maintenance and Recovery Battalion (Panteleymonovka, Primorskiy Kray)
- 201st Separate Medical Battalion (Koltsevoye, Primorskiy Kray)
- 1136th Separate Material Supply Battalion (Panteleymonovka, Primorskiy Kray)
