= Usuglinskoye mine =

Fluorite mine in Russia

- Location: Primorsky Krai, Russia
- Products: Fluorite

The Usuglinskoye mine is a large mine located in the south-eastern Russia in Primorsky Krai. Usuglinskoye represents one of the largest fluorite reserves in Russia having estimated reserves of 2.9 million tonnes of ore grading 64% fluorite.
