= Kiyevka (river) =

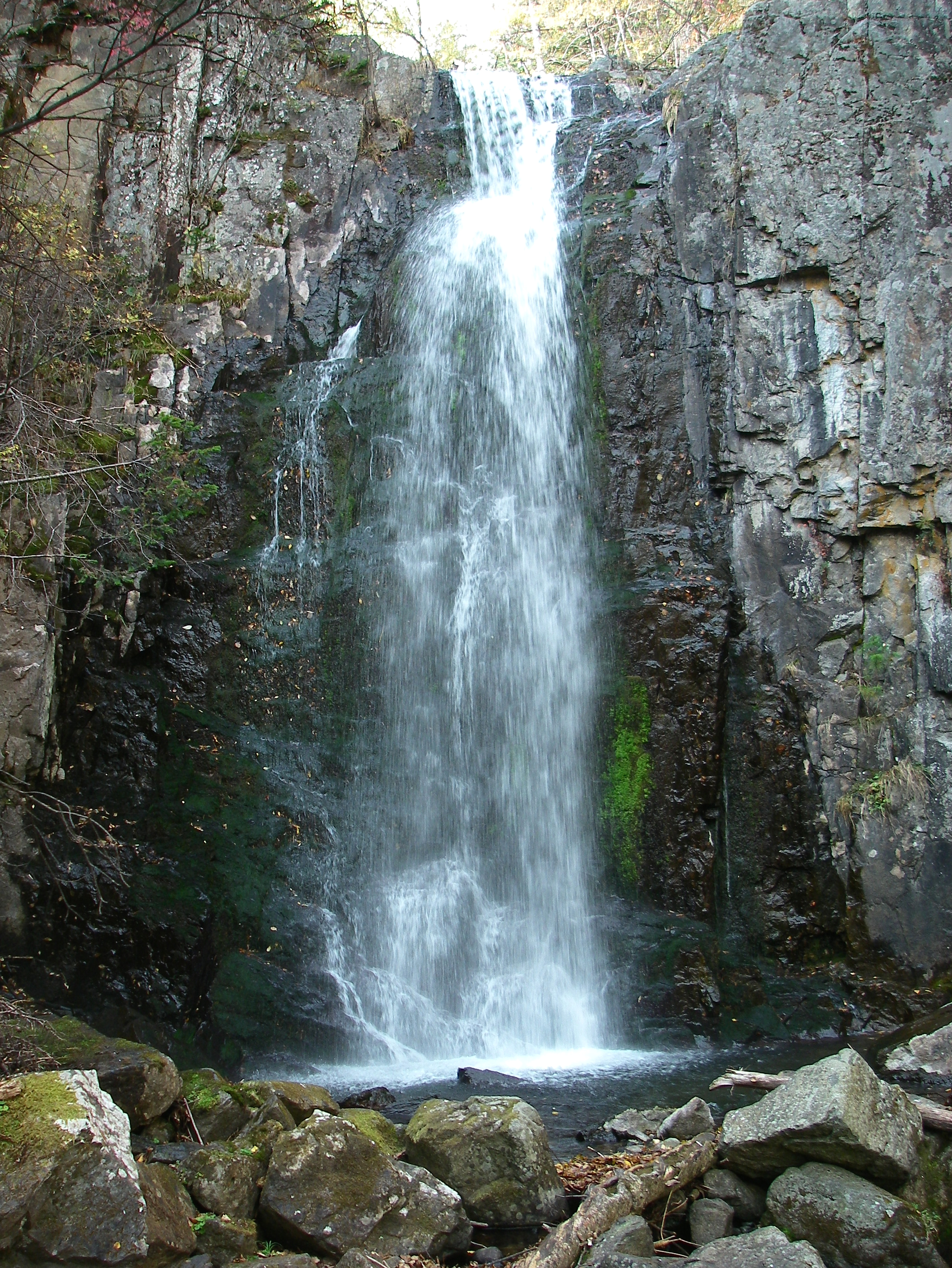
- Star of Primorye, the highest of Benev Waterfalls

Location
- Country: Russia

Physical characteristics
- Source
  - location: Sikhote-Alin
- Mouth
  - location: Sea of Japan
  - coordinates: 42°50′5″N 133°40′32″E
- Length: 105 km (65 mi)
- Basin size: 3,120 km^{2} (1,200 sq mi)

The Kiyevka (Russian: Киевка, formerly Судзухе Sudzukhe) is a river in Primorsky Krai, Russia.

It is 105 kilometres (65 mi) long with a drainage basin of 3,120 square kilometres (1,200 sq mi). Kiyevka rises in Southern Sikhote-Alin and flows into the Kiyevka Bay of the Sea of Japan. The main tributaries are the Krivaya, which is 71 kilometres (44 mi) long; the Lazovka, 54 kilometres (34 mi), and the Benyovka, 37 kilometres (23 mi). There are more than 20 waterfalls on the river (Benev Waterfalls), the highest is Star of Primorye at 20 metres (66 ft).

The river was named after Kyiv by settlers from Ukraine.

== See also ==
- Lazovsky District
