= Lazovsky District =

Lazovsky District Лазовский район (Russian)
- District
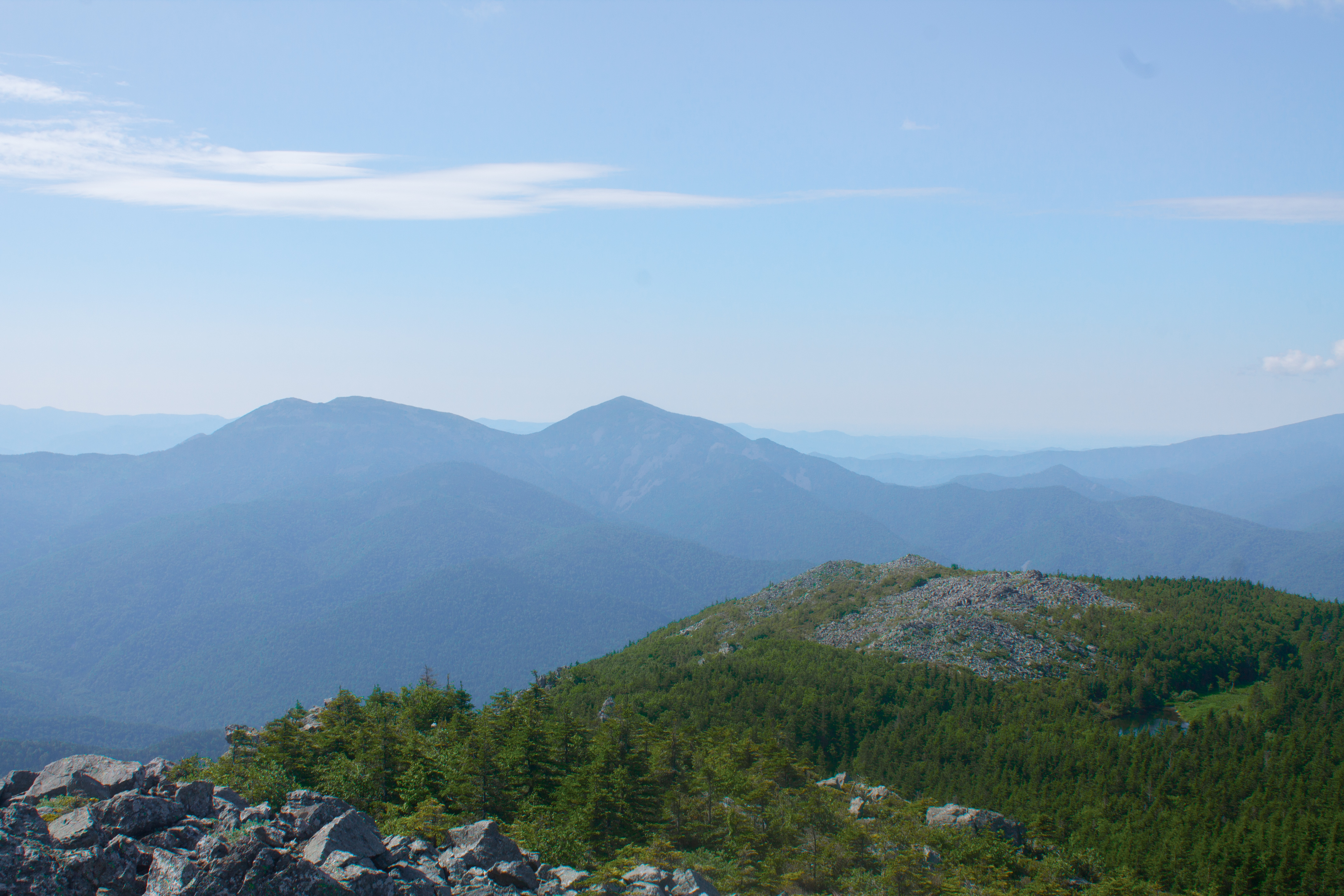
- Bald Mountain, Lazovsky District

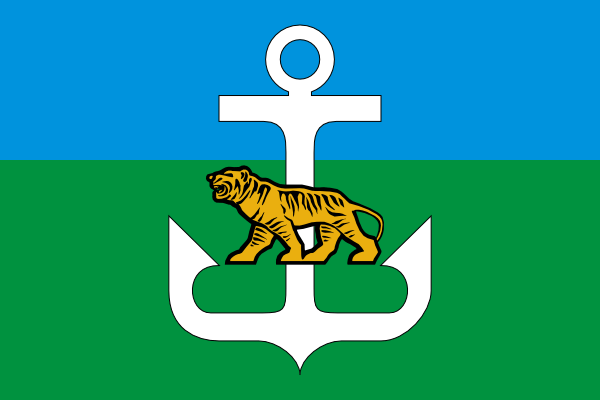
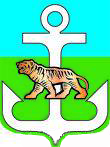
- Flag Coat of arms
- Location of Lazovsky District in Primorsky Krai
- Coordinates: 43°15′N 134°00′E
- Country: Russia
- Federal subject: Primorsky Krai
- Established: March 4, 1941
- Administrative center: Lazo

Area
  - Total: 4,691.5 km^{2} (1,811.4 sq mi)

Population (2010 Census)
  - Total: 14,235
  - Density: 3.0342/km^{2} (7.8586/sq mi)
  - Urban: 50.5%
  - Rural: 49.5%

Administrative structure
  - Inhabited localities: 1 urban-type settlements, 16 rural localities

Municipal structure
  - Municipally incorporated as: Lazovsky Municipal District
  - Municipal divisions: 1 urban settlements, 4 rural settlements
- Time zone: UTC+10 (MSK+7)
- OKTMO ID: 05617000
- Website: http://mo.primorsky.ru/lazovsky/

Lazovsky District (Russian: Лазо́вский райо́н) is an administrative and municipal district (raion), one of the twenty-two in Primorsky Krai, Russia. It is located in the southeast of the krai on the eastern slopes of the Sikhote-Alin mountain range and its southern spurs, bordering the Sea of Japan to the east. The area of the district is 4,691.5 square kilometers (1,811.4 sq mi). Its administrative center is the rural locality (a selo) of Lazo. Population: 14,235 (2010 census); 17,521 (2002 census); 21,311 (1989 Soviet census). The population of Lazo accounts for 24.1% of the district's total population.

== Geography ==
24.8% of the district's territory is occupied by the Lazovsky Nature Reserve, which was established between 1935-1957 and has an area of 121,000 ha (1,210km2). The main river in the district is the Kiyevka.

== History ==
The district was split from Olginsky District on March 4, 1941 as Sokolovsky District, and was given its present name on August 26, 1949 after the administrative center was moved to Lazo from the settlement of Sudzukhe.

== Economy ==
Most of the population is involved in the coastal and oceanic fishing, mariculture development, and fish and sea products processing. JSC Preobrazhenskaya Trawling Fleet Base and Valentin Fish Factory operate in the district.

Among the district's mineral deposits are tin and gold deposits. The thermal mineral waters are of great importance. Chistovodnoye, the krai's specialized hospital, where illness of locomotor apparatus and skin diseases are treated, is located on the radon springs. Two lakes with medical mud are also used.

=== Transportation ===
No railways operate on the territory of the district. Communication with the outer world is by auto and sea transport.
