= Lesozavodsk =

Town in Primorsky Krai, Russia

Lesozavodsk Лесозаводск
- Town
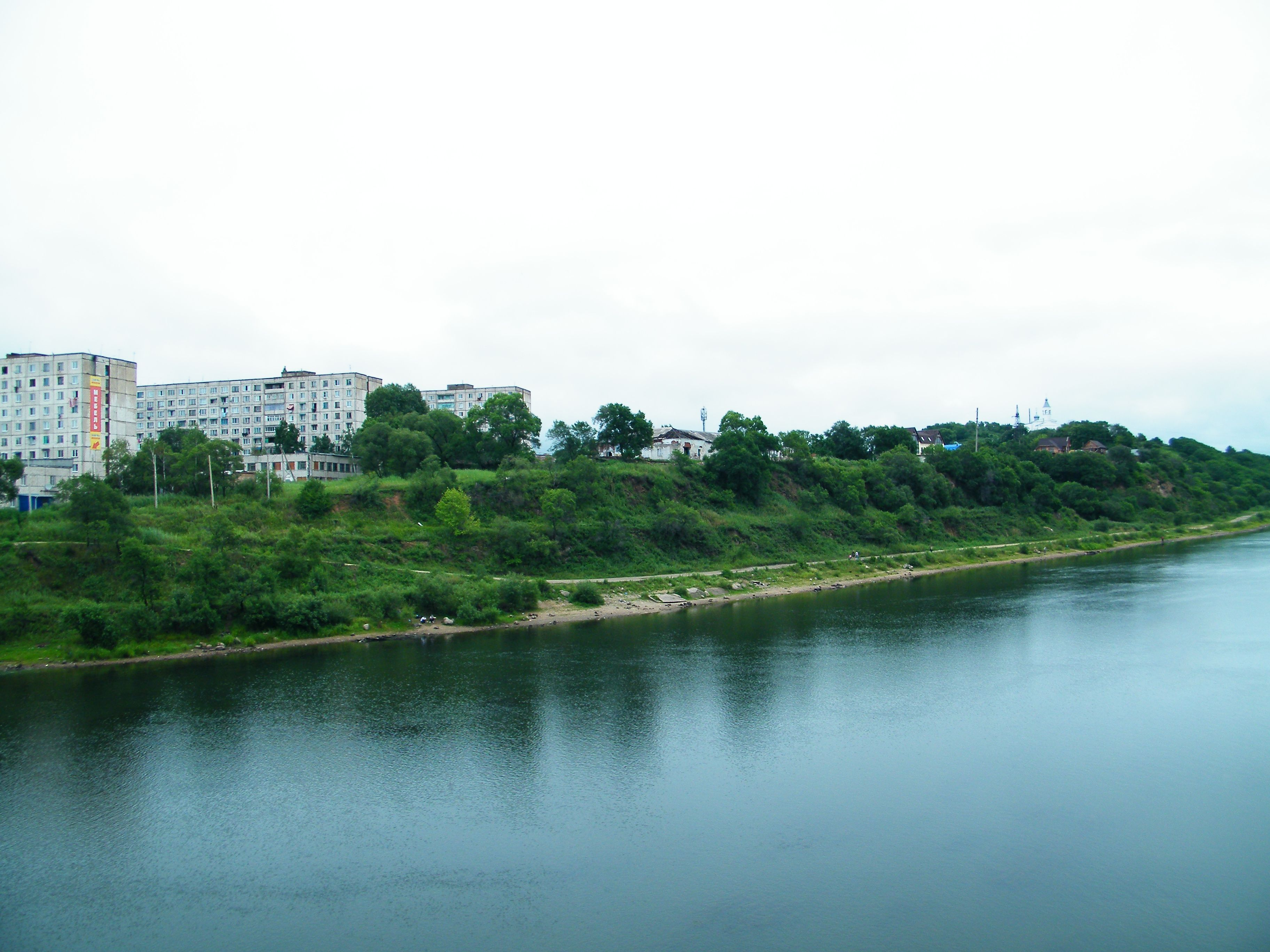
- The Ussuri River in Lesozavodsk

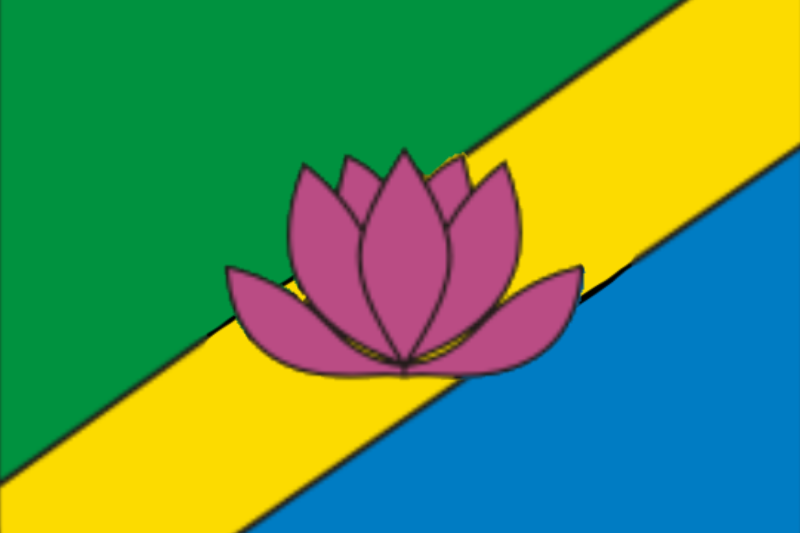
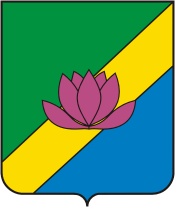
- Flag Coat of arms
- Interactive map of Lesozavodsk
- Location of Lesozavodsk Lesozavodsk (Primorsky Krai)
- Coordinates: 45°28′N 133°24′E
- Country: Russia
- Federal subject: Primorsky Krai
- Founded: 1924
- Town status since: 1938

Government
  - Head: Andrey Sukhanov
- Elevation: 80 m (260 ft)

Population (2010 Census)
  - Total: 37,034
  - Estimate (2025): 34,289 (−7.4%)

Administrative status
  - Subordinated to: Lesozavodsk Town Under Krai Jurisdiction
  - Capital of: Lesozavodsk Town Under Krai Jurisdiction

Municipal status
  - Urban okrug: Lesozavodsky Urban Okrug
  - Capital of: Lesozavodsky Urban Okrug
- Time zone: UTC+10 (MSK+7)
- Postal codes: 692031, 692033, 692036, 692038–692042, 692047–692049
- Dialing code: +7 42355
- OKTMO ID: 05711000001
- Website: лесозаводск-пк.рф

Lesozavodsk (Russian: Лесозаво́дск) is a town in Primorsky Krai, Russia, located on the Ussuri River (Amur's tributary), 10 kilometers (6.2 mi) from the Sino–Russian border and about 300 kilometers (190 mi) north of Vladivostok, the administrative center of the krai. Population: 37,034 (2010 census); 42,185 (2002 census); 44,065 (1989 Soviet census); 37,000 (1972).

== History ==
The first settlement on the site was founded in 1924 in connection with a sawmill. The settlement was originally named Dalles (Дальлес), from the Russian word dalny for "distant" (referring to the Russian Far East) and les for "forest". In 1932, Dalles was merged with the nearby village of Novostroyka, granted urban-type settlement status and renamed Lesozavodsk. Lesozavodsk was granted town status in 1938.

== Administrative and municipal status ==
Within the framework of administrative divisions, it is, together with twenty-one rural localities, incorporated as Lesozavodsk Town Under Krai Jurisdiction—an administrative unit with the status equal to that of the districts. As a municipal division, Lesozavodsk Town Under Krai Jurisdiction is incorporated as Lesozavodsky Urban Okrug.

== Transport ==
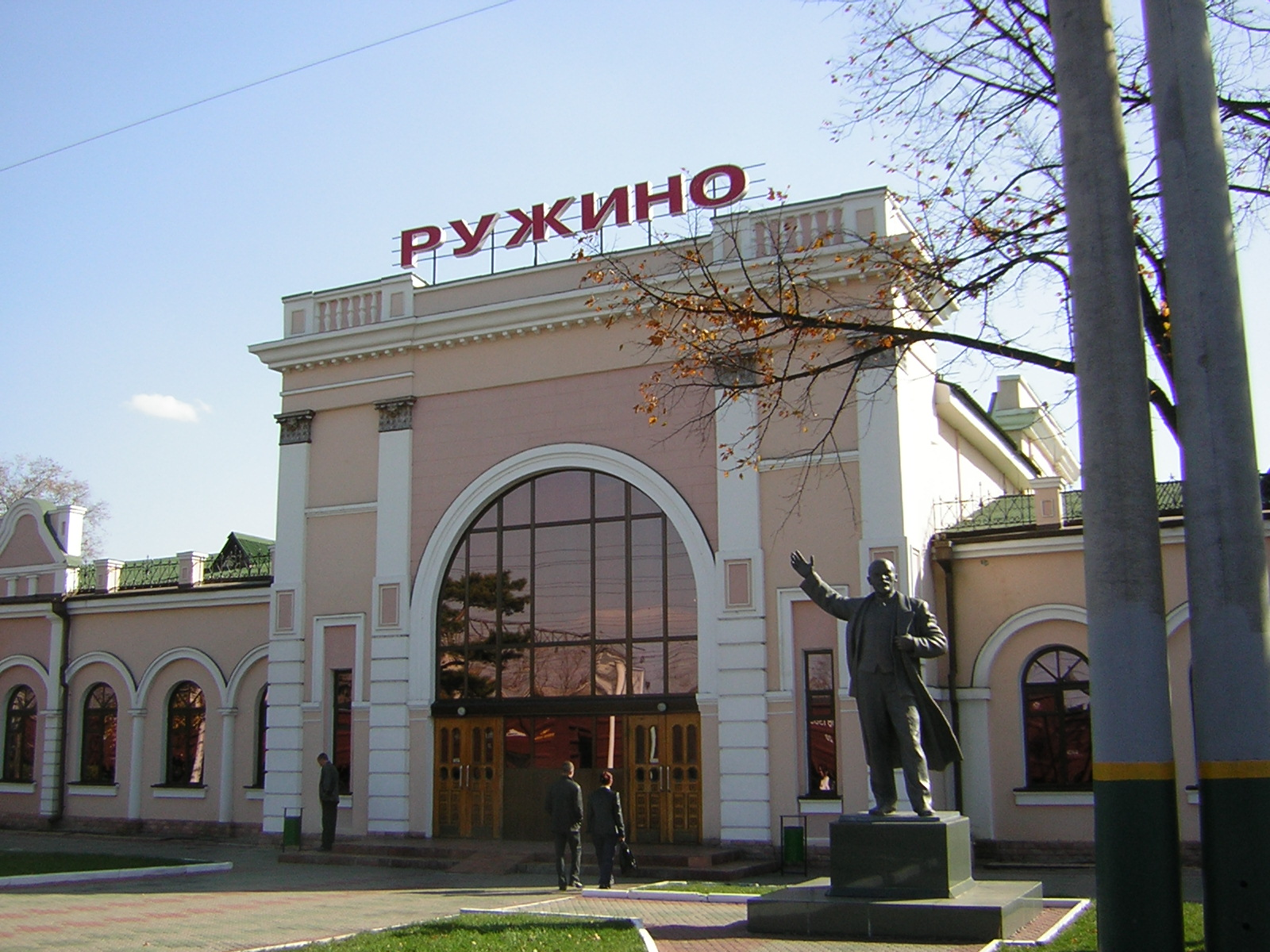
Ruzhino railway station

Ruzhino railway station of the Trans-Siberian Railway is located in Lesozavodsk. The M60 Highway between Khabarovsk and Vladivostok passes about 10 kilometers (6.2 mi) east of the town.

== Military ==
The 130th Machine Gun Artillery Division of the 5th Army, Far Eastern Military District was based here until 2009 or 2010, when it became a motorized rifle brigade and then a storage base.

== Climate ==
Lesozavodsk has a humid continental climate with cold and dry winters, due to the Siberian High, and hot and humid summers, due to the Southeast Asian monsoons.

Climate data for Lesozavodsk
Month	Jan	Feb	Mar	Apr	May	Jun	Jul	Aug	Sep	Oct	Nov	Dec	Year
Mean daily maximum °C (°F)	−12.1 (10.2)	−7.2 (19.0)	2.5 (36.5)	14.1 (57.4)	21.0 (69.8)	25.2 (77.4)	27.7 (81.9)	27.2 (81.0)	22.0 (71.6)	13.6 (56.5)	1.6 (34.9)	−8.7 (16.3)	10.6 (51.0)
Daily mean °C (°F)	−18.0 (−0.4)	−13.5 (7.7)	−4.0 (24.8)	7.0 (44.6)	14.1 (57.4)	19.3 (66.7)	22.6 (72.7)	21.8 (71.2)	15.3 (59.5)	6.7 (44.1)	−4.4 (24.1)	−14.5 (5.9)	4.4 (39.9)
Mean daily minimum °C (°F)	−23.9 (−11.0)	−19.8 (−3.6)	−10.5 (13.1)	−0.1 (31.8)	7.2 (45.0)	13.4 (56.1)	17.5 (63.5)	16.4 (61.5)	8.6 (47.5)	−0.2 (31.6)	−10.4 (13.3)	−20.3 (−4.5)	−1.8 (28.7)
Average precipitation mm (inches)	11 (0.4)	8 (0.3)	16 (0.6)	26 (1.0)	49 (1.9)	61 (2.4)	98 (3.9)	116 (4.6)	79 (3.1)	42 (1.7)	22 (0.9)	13 (0.5)	541 (21.3)

Historical population
Year	Pop.	±%
1926	3,812	—
1939	24,078	+531.6%
1959	32,124	+33.4%
1970	34,957	+8.8%
1979	38,790	+11.0%
1989	44,065	+13.6%
2002	42,185	−4.3%
2010	37,034	−12.2%
2021	35,433	−4.3%
Source: Census data

== Notable people ==
- Sergey Tereshchenko, former Prime Minister of Kazakhstan
- Amūru Mitsuhiro, sumo wrestler
