= Skrebtsov island =

Island in Amur Bay, Sea of Japan

Coordinates: 43°13′06″N 131°54′49″E

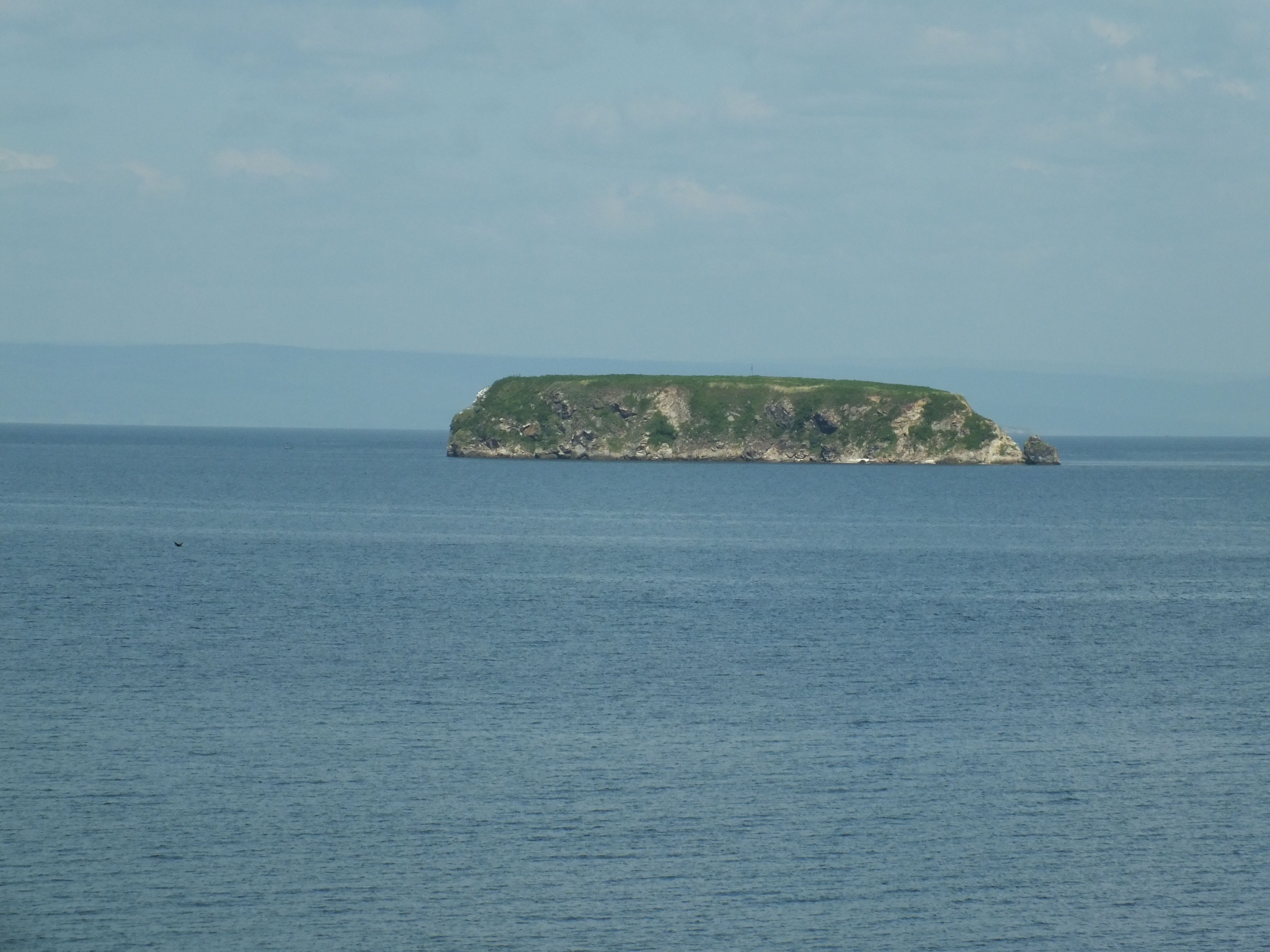
Skrebtsova Island

Skrebtsova Island, popularly known as Kovrizhka ("honey-cake"), is an island in the Amur Bay, Sea of Japan, 2 km north-west of the coast of Vladivostok. Named in 1863 in honor of M. L. Skrebtsova who participated in hydrographic research of Peter the Great.

== Geography ==
Its area is approximately 1.28 hectares. Its maximum altitude is 22 meters. It has a steep shore, with a coastline of just under 500 m. The island is covered with grass and shrubs. To the west of the island stretches Skrebtsova Reef, and north-west lies the bank. To the east is a narrow strip stretching ridge surface and underwater rocks.

Transport to and from the island is unavailable but may be achieved by private boat. In the winter, from January to early March, it can be accessed by walking across the ice.

== History ==
In the early 1890s, the island housed a camp points of convicts from Sakhalin brought to Primorye for heavy labor. Later, the camp was closed due to high cost and the inconvenience of transporting prisoners. During the Great Patriotic War, the island housed gardens.

In 1961, during excavations carried out on the island, has been found of ancient people who lived in the first millennium BC. Remains of human activity belong to the Jankowski culture prevalent in the coastal areas of southern Primorye.

Currently, the island is uninhabited and no economic activity is conducted on it.
