= Primorsky Krai =

First-level administrative division of Russia

Primorsky Krai Приморский край (Russian)
- Krai
- Flag Coat of arms

- Coordinates: 45°20′N 134°40′E
- Country: Russia
- Federal district: Far Eastern
- Economic region: Far Eastern
- Established: October 20, 1938
- Administrative center: Vladivostok

Government
  - Body: Legislative Assembly
  - Governor: Konstantin Shestakov (acting)

Area
  - Total: 164,673 km^{2} (63,581 sq mi)
  - Rank: 23rd

Population (2021 census)
  - Total: 1,845,165
  - Estimate (2018): 1,913,037
  - Rank: 26th
  - Density: 11.2050/km^{2} (29.0209/sq mi)
  - Urban: 78.4%
  - Rural: 21.6%

GDP (nominal, 2024)
  - Total: ₽2.14 trillion (US$25.05 billion)
  - Per capita: ₽1.18 million (US$13,897.8)
- Time zone: UTC+10 (MSK+7)
- ISO 3166 code: RU-PRI
- License plates: 25, 125
- OKTMO ID: 05000000
- Official languages: Russian
- Website: http://www.primorsky.ru/

small coat of arms of Primorsky Krai

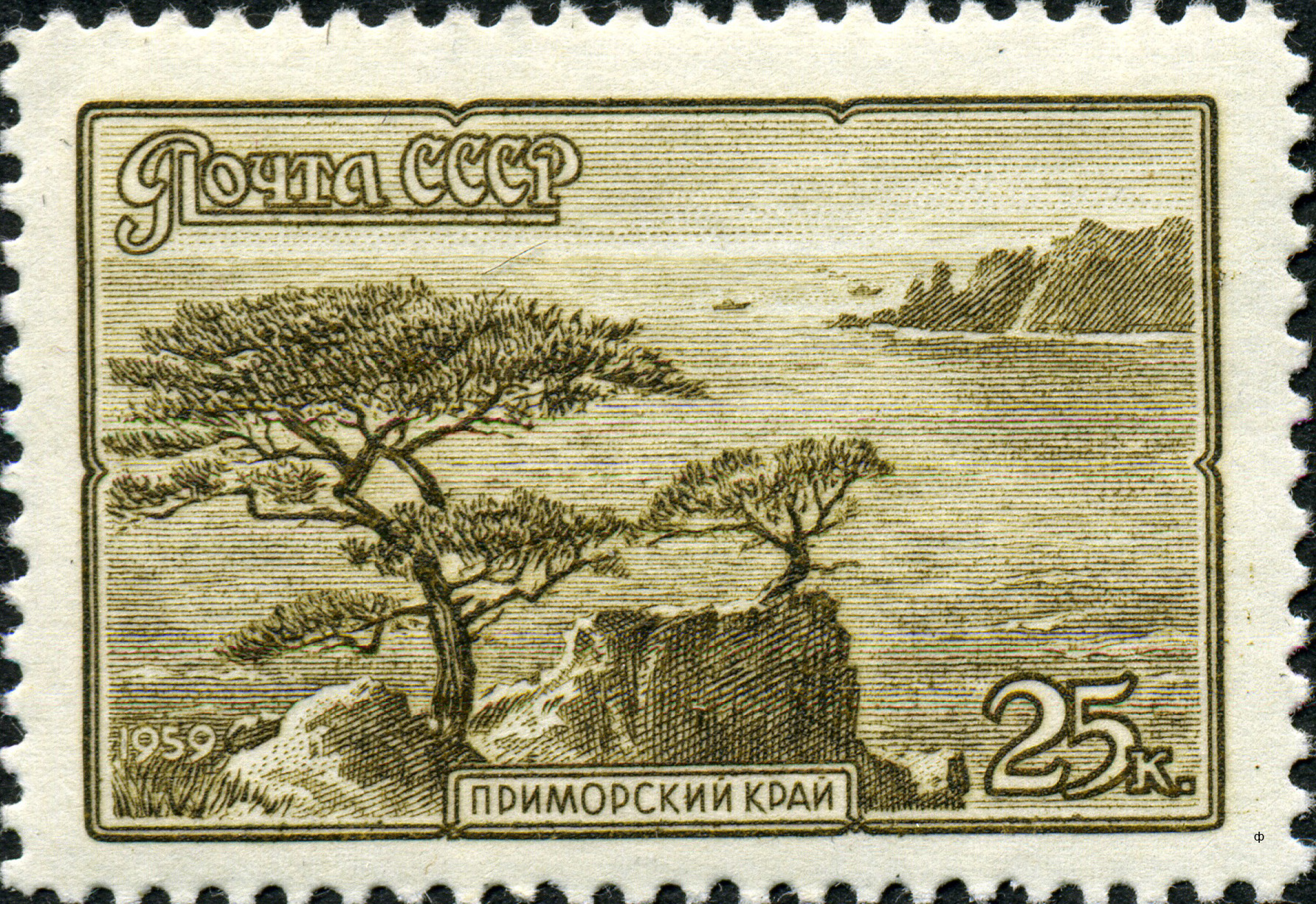
Postage stamp of the USSR: Primorsky Krai.

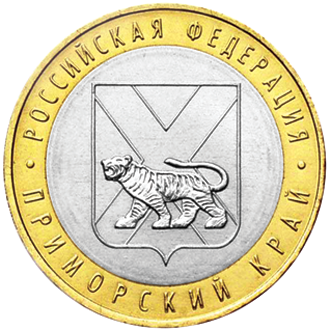
Commemorative coin of the Bank of Russia with a face value of 10 rubles (2006)

Primorsky Krai, (Note: Russian: Приморский край, romanized: Primorskiy kray, lit. 'Maritime Territory', Russian pronunciation: [prʲɪˈmorskʲɪj kraj]) informally known as Primorye, (Note: Russian: Приморье, Russian pronunciation: [prʲɪˈmorʲjɪ]) is a federal subject (a krai) of Russia, part of the Far Eastern Federal District in the Russian Far East. The city of Vladivostok on the southern coast of the krai is its administrative center, and the second largest city in the Russian Far East, behind Khabarovsk in the neighbouring Khabarovsk Krai. Primorsky Krai has the largest economy among the federal subjects in the Russian Far East, and a population of 1,845,165 as of the 2021 Census.

The krai has Russia's only border with North Korea, along the Tumen River in Khasansky District in the southwestern corner of the krai. Peter the Great Gulf, the largest gulf in the Sea of Japan, is on the south coast.

The territory of the krai was historically part of Manchuria. It was ceded to the Russian Empire by Qing China in 1860 as part of a region known as Outer Manchuria, forming most of the territory of Primorskaya Oblast. As a result, China permanently lost its coastline with the Sea of Japan. During the Russian Civil War it became part of the Far Eastern Republic before joining the Soviet Union, going through numerous changes until reaching its current form in 1938. Primorsky Krai is home to the Russian Navy's Pacific Fleet and is also known as the birthplace of North Korean leader Kim Jong-il.

== Etymology ==
The name of the krai is derived from the Russian words приморский (primorsky), meaning "littoral" or "coastal", and край (kray), meaning "region" or "area". It is informally known as Primorye (Приморье, IPA: [prʲɪˈmorʲjɪ]) in Russian, and is occasionally translated as Maritime Territory in English.

== Geography ==
- Border length — over 3,000 kilometers (1,864 mi), including 1,350 kilometers (839 mi) of the sea borders.
- Highest peak — Anik Mountain, 1,933 meters (6,342 ft)
- Rail network length — 1,628 kilometers (1,012 mi) (of which 345 kilometers (214 mi) are electrified).
- Automobile road length — 12,633 kilometers (7,850 mi)

Primorsky Krai, bordered by China (Jilin and Heilongjiang), North Korea (Rason) and Khabarovsk Krai, and the relatively warm—although freezing in winter—waters of the Sea of Japan, is the southeasternmost region of Russia, located between the 42° and 48° north latitude and 130° and 139° east longitude. It is stretched in the meridianal direction, the distance from its extreme northern point to its most southerly point being about 900 kilometers (559 mi).

=== Topography ===
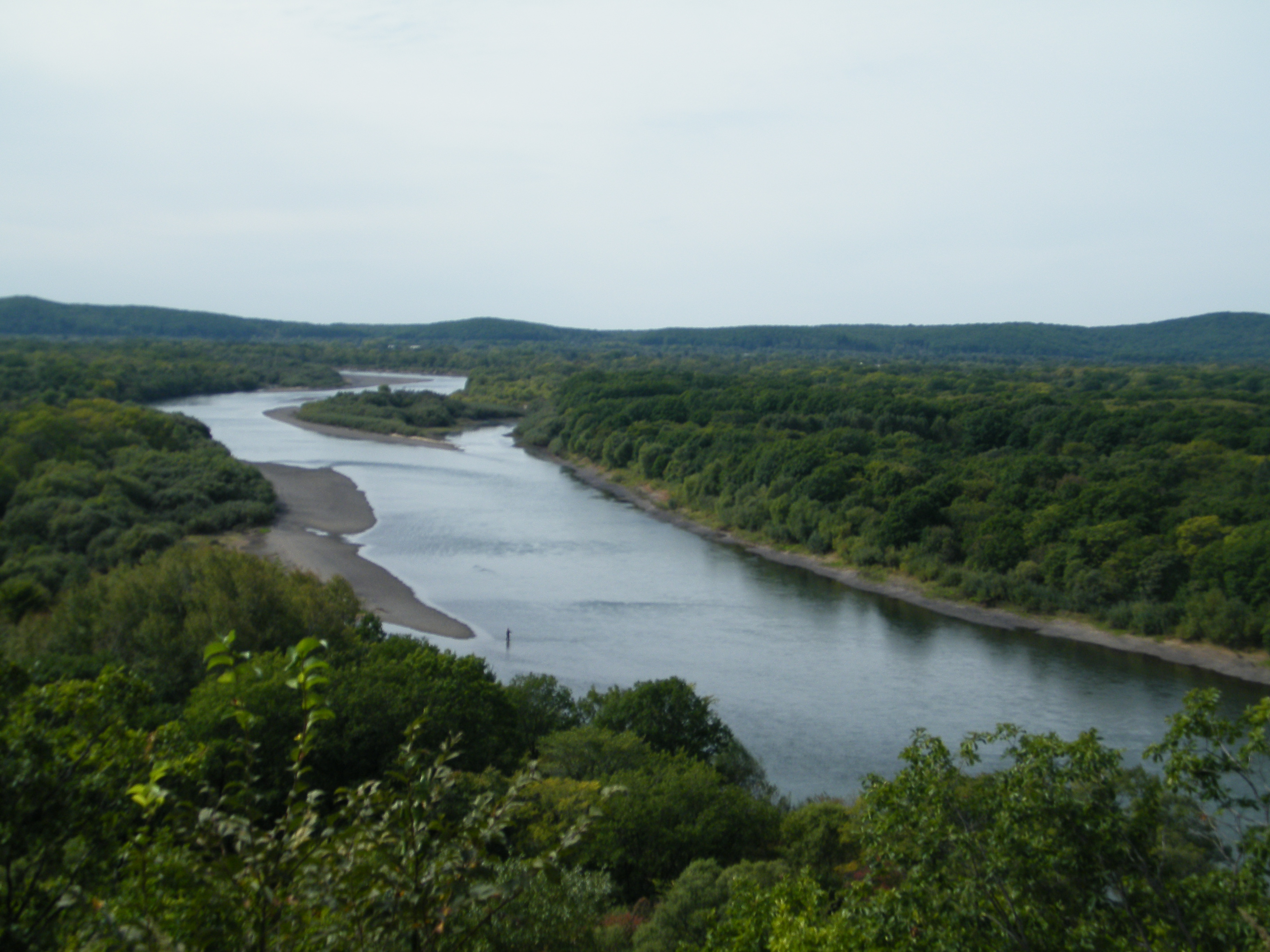
Ussuri River

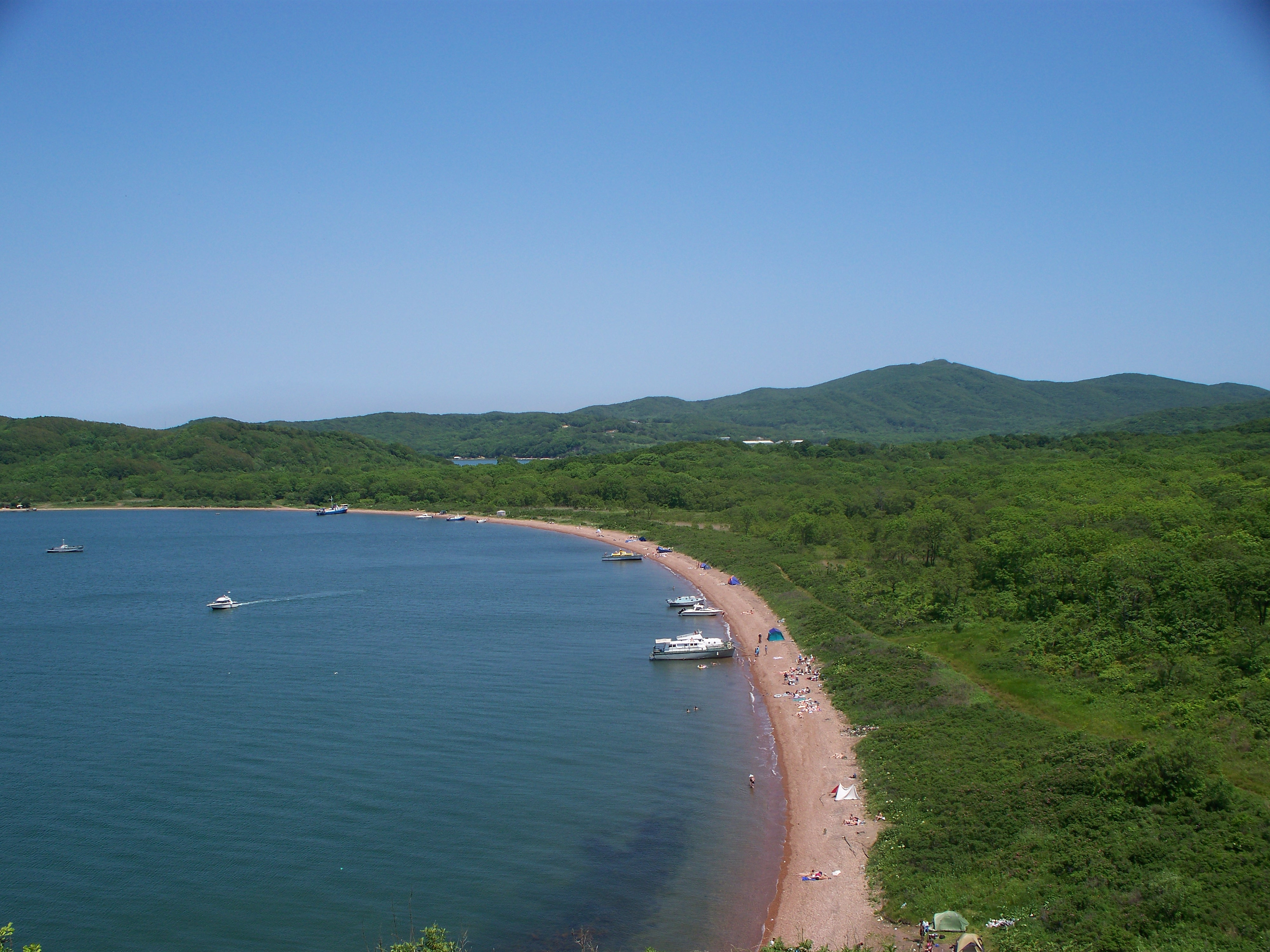
Philippovsky Bay, Russky Island

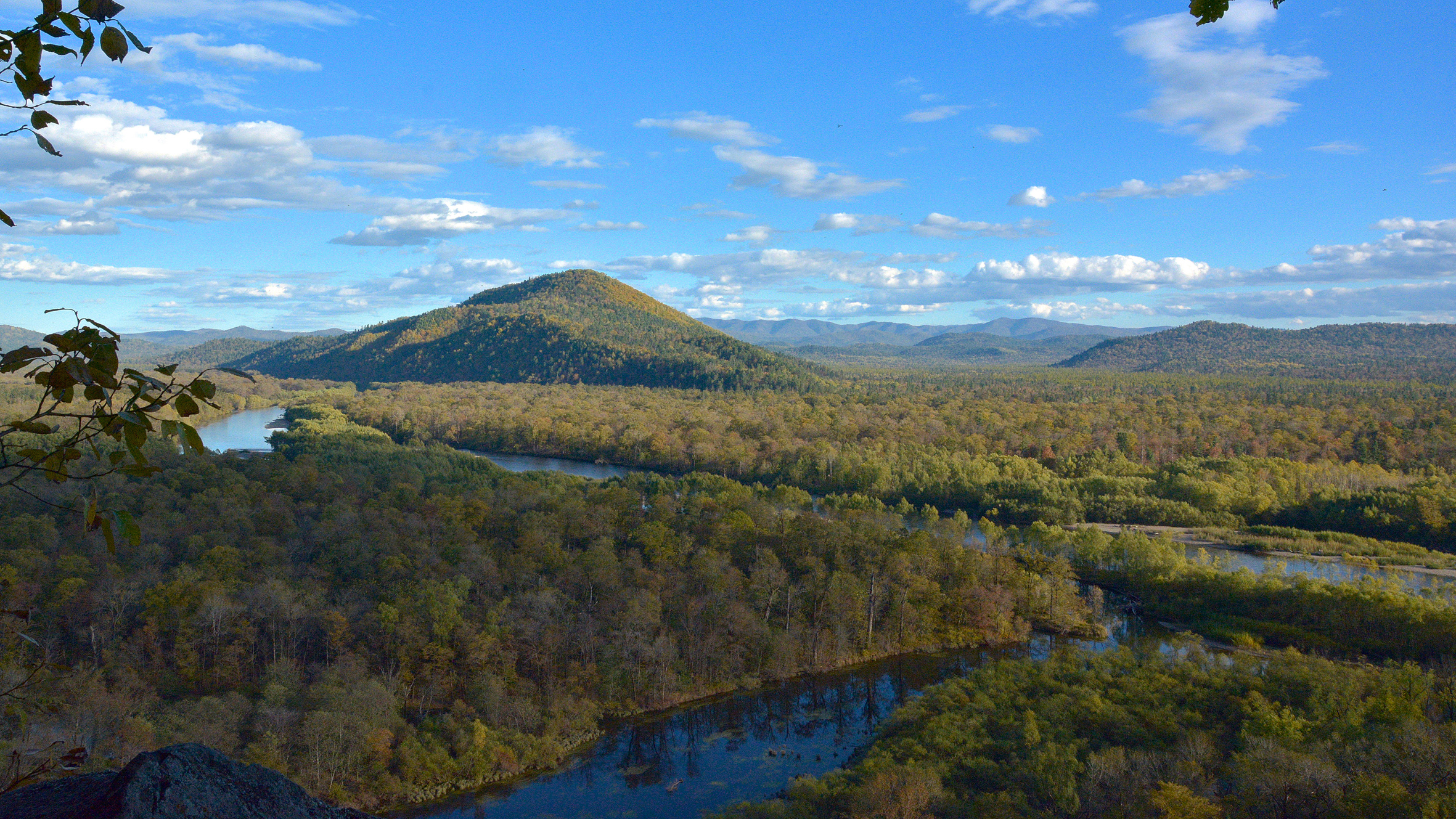
Bikin National Park

Highlands dominate the territory of the krai. Most of the territory is mountainous, and almost 80% of it is forested. The average elevation is about 500 meters (1,640 ft). Sikhote-Alin is a mountainous formation, extending for the most part of the Krai. It consists of a number of parallel ranges: the Partizansky (Partisan), the Siny (Blue), the Kholodny (Cold), and others. There are many karst caves in the south of Primorye, including the relatively accessible Spyashchaya Krasavitsa cave (the Sleeping Beauty) in the Ussuriysky Nature Preserve. There are comparatively well-preserved fragments of ancient volcanoes in the area.

The ranges are cut by the picturesque narrow and deep valleys of the rivers and by large brooks, such as the Partizanskaya, the Kiyevka, the Zerkalnaya, the Cheryomukhovaya, the Yedinka, the Samarga, the Bikin, and the Bolshaya Ussurka. Most rivers in the Krai have rocky bottoms and limpid water. The largest among them is the Ussuri, with a length of 903 kilometers (561 mi). The head of the Ussuri River originates 20 kilometers (12 mi) east of Oblachnaya Mountain. The vast Khanka Lowlands extend into the west and southwest of Primorye, carpeted by coniferous-deciduous forest. A part of the Lowland surrounding the largest lake in the Russian Far East, Khanka Lake, is occupied by a forest-steppe.

=== Coast and islands ===
The krai's coastline is fairly straight, except for the southernmost section around Vladivostok which contains the Muravyov-Amursky Peninsula. There are numerous islands in this area, the main ones being Lisy Island, Askold Island, Putyatin Island, Skrebtsov island, Sibiryakov Island, the Eugénie Archipelago (the largest island of which being Russky Island), the Rimsky-Korsakov Archipelago and Furugelm Island.

=== Flora and fauna ===
The geographic location of Primorye accounts for the variety of its flora. The territory of Primorye has not been subjected to the ice cover in the past in contrast to the rest of Siberia during the ice ages. The specifics of the geographic situation and the specific features of climate determine the unique diversity of the plant world at species and genetic levels and the richness of plant resources. In the flora of Primorye, there are more than two thousand species of higher plants, of which are about 250 species of trees, bushes, and ligneous lianas. Flora of mosses and lichens are very diverse. As part of the coastal flora, there are many valuable medicinal, technical and food plants, many relict and endemic species. About 200 species are listed in the IUCN Red List as rare and threatened extermination.

There are mountainous tundra areas, conifers and coniferous-deciduous forests, and forest-steppe, which is sometimes called the Far Eastern Prairie, where many ancient plant species have been preserved, including ferns, lotus, and the willow Salix arbutifolia (syn. Chosenia arbutifolia). The flora of the territory contains such plants as Taxus cuspidata, Juniperus rigida, Phellodendron amurense, Kalopanax, Aralia elata, Maackia amurensis, Alnus japonica, Actinidia kolomikta, Schisandra chinensis, Celastrus orbiculatus, Thladiantha dubia, Weigela, Eleutherococcus, Flueggea suffruticosa, Deutzia, Nelumbo nucifera, Betula schmidtii, Quercus mongolica, Betula dahurica, Carpinus cordata, Acer mandshuricum, Parthenocissus tricuspidata, Vitis amurensis, Panax ginseng and many others.

The fauna of Primorye is also diverse. The following animals are found in the Krai: Ussuri black bear (Ursus thibetanus), Amur tiger, Amur leopard (Panthera pardus orientalis), Eurasian lynx (Lynx lynx), wild boar (Sus scrofa), Manchurian deer (Cervus elaphus xanthopygos), Siberian roe deer (Capreolus pygargus), musk deer (Moschus moschiferus), long-tailed goral (Naemorhedus caudatus), sika deer (Cervus nippon), sable (Martes zibellina), Blakiston's fish owl (Bubo blakistoni), mandarinka duck (Aix galericulata), black stork (Ciconia nigra), scaly goosander (Mergus squamatus), chestnut-cheeked starling (Sturnia philippensis), black griffon (Aegypius monachus), large-winged cuckoo (family Cuculidae), and others. Among 690 species of birds inhabiting the territory of the former USSR, 350 are found in Primorye. Rich fisheries of salmon, Hucho taimen, lenok and marine fisheries of crab, pollock and other species make the aquatic and maritime environment a valuable resource for the region. However, the rich diversity of wildlife in Primorye is threatened by poaching and the illegal wildlife trade. Wildlife Conservation Society, World Wildlife Fund, Wild Salmon Center, and Russian NGOs including Phoenix Fund are active in the region's wildlife and habitat conservation.

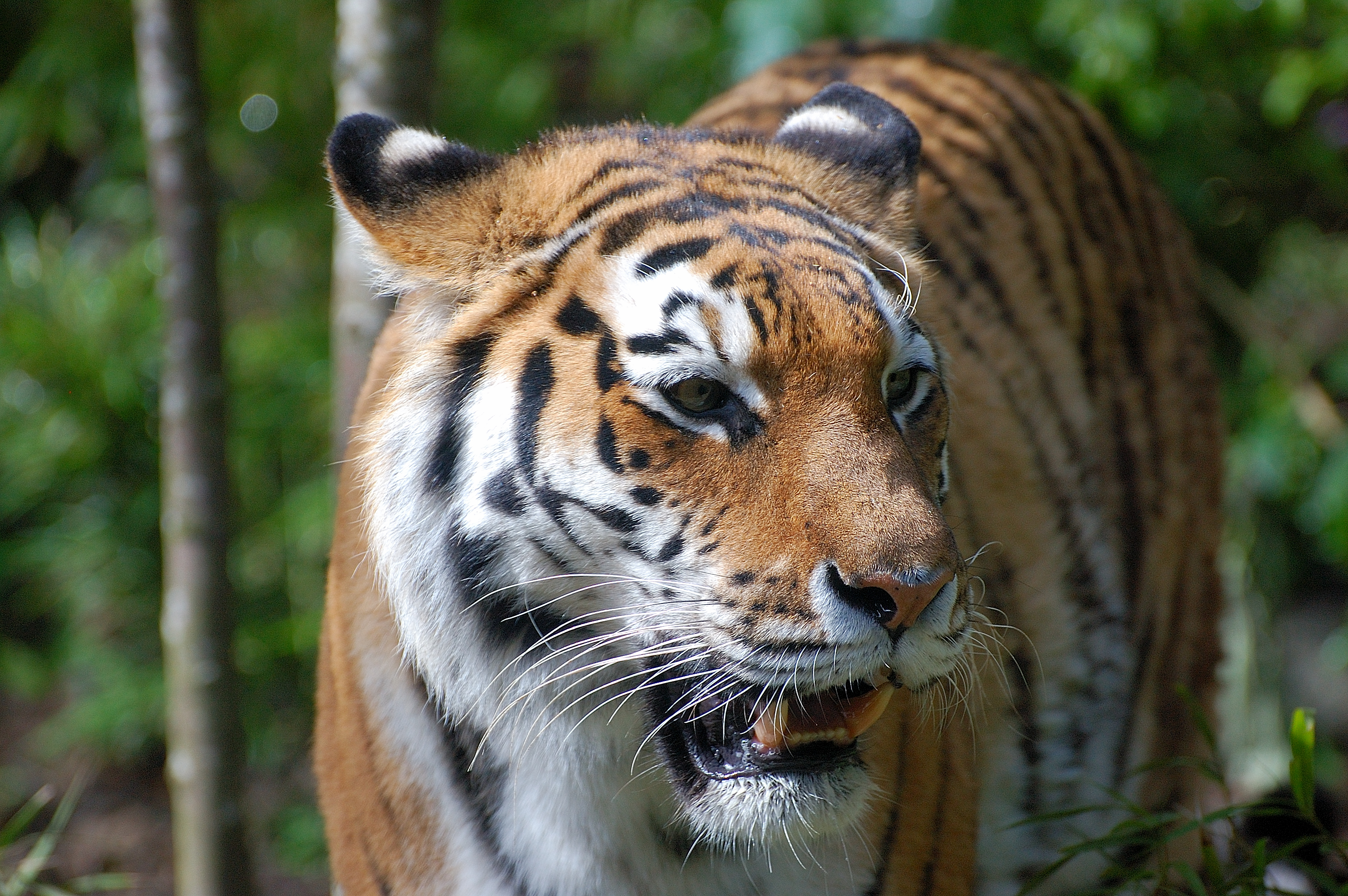
Most of the world's population of wild Siberian tigers is found in Primorsky Krai

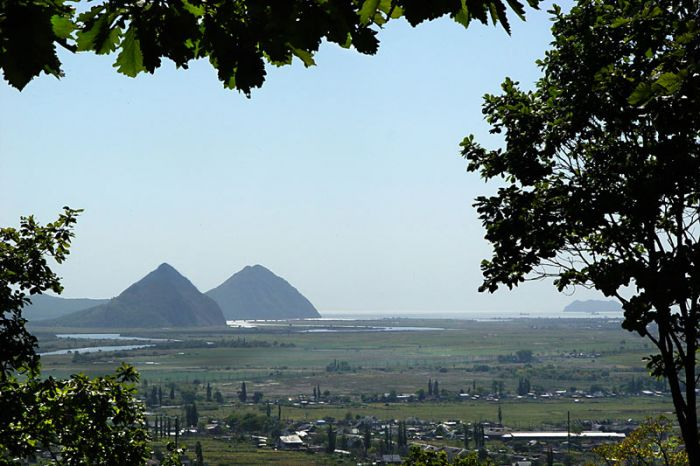
The cliffs Brat ("Brother") and Sestra ("Sister") in the environs of Nakhodka.

=== Climate ===
- Primorsky Krai is dominated by a four-season humid continental climate.
- Average annual temperature — near +1 °C (34 °F) in the north of the krai; +5.5 °C (41.9 °F) on the southern coast.
- Average annual precipitation — 520-920 mm per year. Precipitation reaches its peak in the summer months.

== History ==
The area is believed to have been settled by several Tungusic and Mongolic tribes, such as the Sushen, the proto-Mongol Shiwei and the Mohe. Although, there are other popular theories, such as the fact that the place was earlier settled by the Ainu people.

The Udege people are said to have traditionally settled in territories along the Bikin River long ago, however, they are possibly of Jianzhou Jurchen origin.

In the past, the land was part of Goguryeo, the northernmost kingdom among the three Korean kingdoms.

During the Balhae Kingdom, most of the krai was within the boundaries of the provinces of Dingli, Anbian and Anyuan. After Balhae was conquered by the Khitans, the territory became part of Liao dynasty's Eastern Circuit and Jin dynasty's Supin Circuit. It then came under Mongol and Manchu rule.

The acquisition of Siberia by the Tsardom of Russia and the subsequent Russian expansion to the Far East brought the Russians into direct contact with China. The Nerchinsk Treaty of 1689 demarcating the borders of the two states gave all lands lying south of the Stanovoy Mountains, including Primorye, to the Qing Empire. However, with the weakening of the Qing Empire in the second half of the 19th century, Russia began its expansion into the area. In 1858, the towns of Khabarovsk and Blagoveshchensk were founded. In 1858, Nikolay Muravyov-Amursky signed the Aigun Treaty with China, followed by the Beijing Treaty two years later. As a result of the two treaties, the Sino–Russian border shifted south in the Amur Annexation to the Amur and Ussuri Rivers, granting Russia full control of Primorye.

Primorskaya Oblast was established as the easternmost division of the Russian Empire in 1856. It included the territory of modern Primorsky Krai as well as the territories of modern Khabarovsk Krai and Magadan Oblast, stretching from Vladivostok to the Chukchi Peninsula in the far north.

In the period from 1859 to 1882, ninety-five settlements were established in the Primorye region, including Vladivostok, Ussuriysk, Razdolnoye, Vladimiro-Aleksandrovskoye, Shkotovo, Pokrovka, Tury Rog, and Kamen-Rybolov. Russians began migrating to these regions. The population was primarily engaged in hunting, fishing and cultivation. More than two-thirds of the territory's inhabitants followed these occupations.

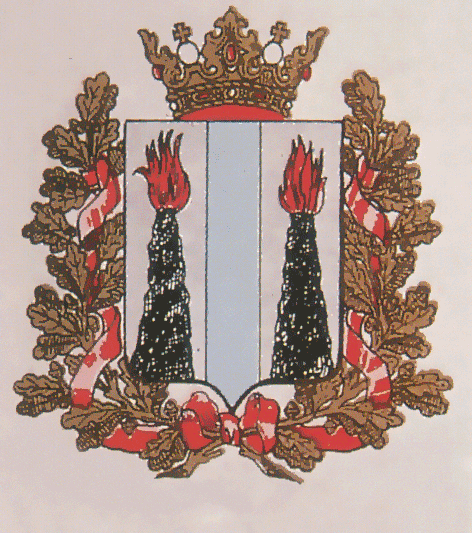
Coat of arms of Primorskaya Oblast in the beginning of the 20th century

During the latter part of the 19th century, there was a significant resource, industrial and resulting economic development in Primorye. Coal mining became a prominent industry, as did the export of sea-kale, velvet antlers, timber, crab, dried fish, and trepangs. The rapid economic expansion of Primorye was financed in large measure by Russian and foreign capital investment.

After the Russian Revolution and the victory of the communists, the new government renamed Primorskaya Oblast as the Zemstvo of Maritime Territory. It was defined as the Far-Eastern Republic (1920–1922). Within the Russian SFSR, this became Far-Eastern Oblast (1922–1926) and then Far-Eastern Krai (1926–1938).

The area became a battleground for allied and Bolshevik troops during the Siberian Intervention. In 1922, shortly before the end of the Civil War, Primorye came under Bolshevik control. The new government directed the economic, scientific, and cultural development of the territory. The Soviet Government spent the following ten years combating "bourgeois ideology" in many areas of life and culture. As a result, the music, theater, literature, and the fine arts of Primorye were censored.

Primorsky was the center of the ethnic Korean minority of Russia. The Pos'et Korean National Raion was created under the policy of Korenizatsiya. The Krai had 105 both fully and mixed Korean towns where residents used the Korean language as an official language. Nearly 200,000 ethnic Koreans were living in the Krai by the time of their deportation in 1938. The Soviet Union had earlier deported ethnic Chinese from western Siberia.

During this period, the Soviet government emphasized centralized planning of the economy. As in the rest of the Soviet Union, priority was given to heavy industry, with a special emphasis on mining and commercial fishing. There was a widespread investment in the construction of rail and sea transit, and new port facilities were constructed.

Primorsky Krai was formed by further subdivision of Far-Eastern Krai in 1938, as part of the Stalin-era policy of "unbundling". Primorsky Krai, as defined in 1938, corresponds to the northeastern part of the historical region of Outer Manchuria.

On April 18, 1942, the region became accidentally involved in World War II, which the United States had entered after Japan attacked Pearl Harbor in December 1941. Primorsky Krai was the location where one of 16 United States Army Air Corps North American B-25 Mitchell medium bombers landed. The group had been launched from USS Hornet to carry out the Doolittle Raid on Japan. Japan and the Soviet Union were not then at war. The landing occurred 40 miles (65 km) west of Vladivostok; the bomber's crew could not return to their base, the aircraft carrier Hornet, by the mission plan. The crew later returned home via Iran.

During the 1970s, the Soviet Union expanded scientific institutions in Primorye, especially in the city of Vladivostok. Several large research institutions are located here, such as the Institute of Biology and Agriculture, the Pacific Institute of Bio-organic Chemistry, the Institute of Marine Biology, the Pacific Institute of Geography, the Pacific Oceanological Institute, as well as several Institutes affiliated with the Far Eastern Division of the Russian Academy of Science.

By the early 1990s, once-small enterprises in the city had developed into large companies. Some of the most prominent include the DVMP (FESCO) shipping company, the Dalmoreprodukt fishing company, Progress Arsenyev Aircraft Works, and Vostok Mining. Commercial fishing plays an important part in the economy of the Primorye and includes firms like Vladivostok Trawling and Refrigerating Fleet (VBTRF), the Active Marine Fisheries Base of Nakhodka, and the Fishing and Marine Transport Fleet of Primorye. Numerous enterprises of the Russian military-industrial complex were also established in Primorye.

The Udege people, led by Pavel Sulyandziga, are trying to gain control over their traditional territories along the Bikin River and in particular a Territory of Traditional Natural Resource Use of federal status.

== Politics ==
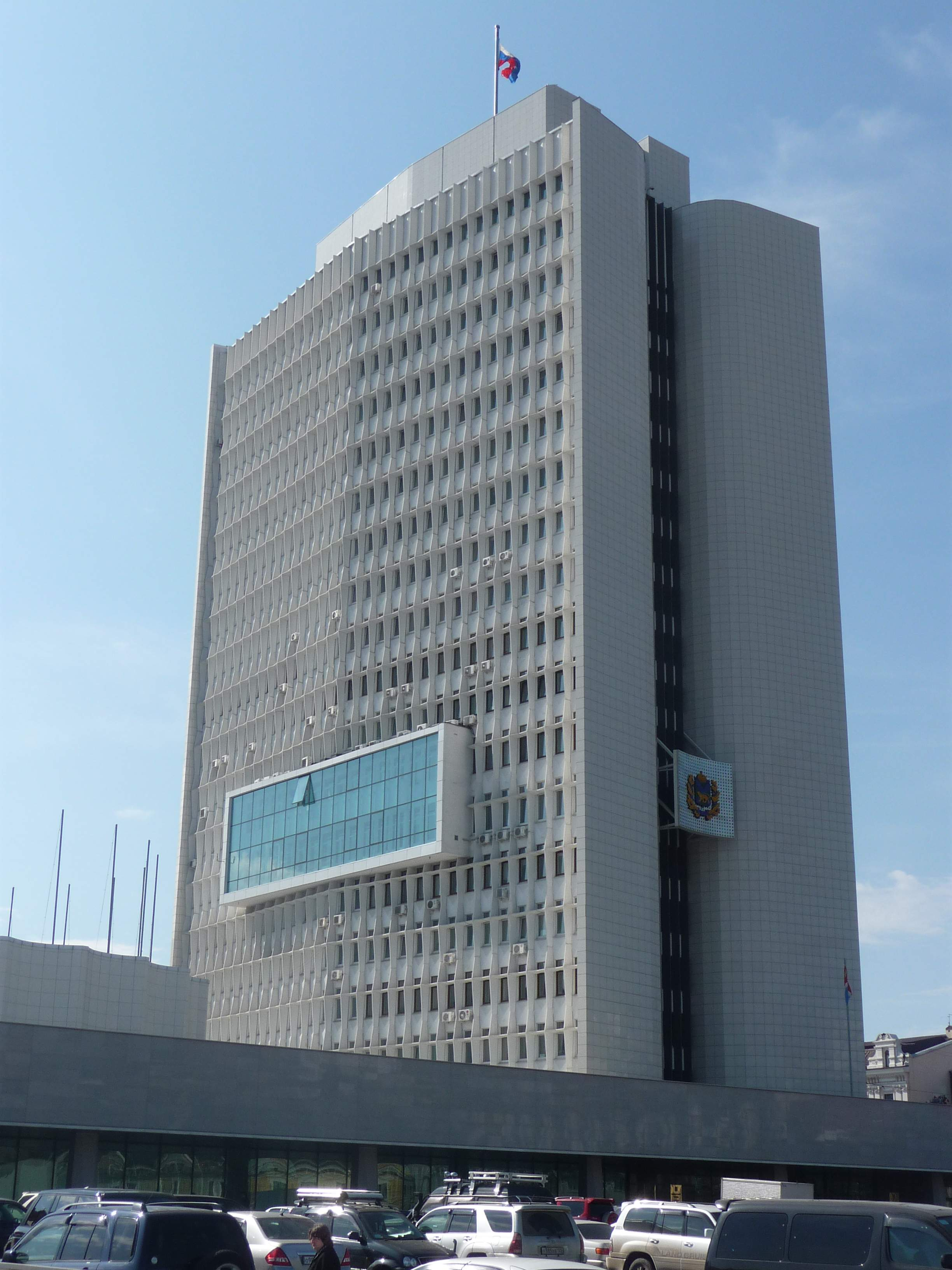
Krai Administration Building

During the Soviet period, the high authority in the oblast was shared between three persons: The first secretary of the Primorsky CPSU Committee (who in reality had the biggest authority), the chairman of the oblast Soviet (legislative power), and the chairman of the oblast Executive Committee (executive power). After 1991, the head of the Oblast administration and eventually the governor was appointed/elected alongside elected regional parliament.

The Charter of Primorsky Krai is the fundamental law of the region. The Legislative Assembly of Primorsky Krai is the province's regional standing legislative (representative) body. The Legislative Assembly exercises its authority by passing laws, resolutions, and other legal acts and by supervising the implementation and observance of the laws and other legal acts passed by it. The highest executive body is the Oblast Government, which includes territorial executive bodies such as district administrations, committees, and commissions that facilitate development and run the day to day matters of the province. The Oblast administration supports the activities of the Governor who is the highest official and acts as the guarantor of the observance of the krai Charter in accordance with the Constitution of Russia.

== Economy ==
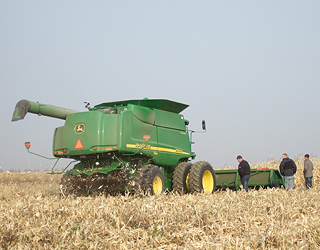
Agriculture in Primorsky Krai

Primorsky Krai's economy, the most balanced in the Russian Far East, is also the largest in absolute terms. Food production is the most important sector, represented mainly by fish processing. Annual catch exceeds two million tonnes, or one half of the Russian Far East total. Second is machine building, where half of the output is geared toward the fishing industry and shipyards. Defense is another important sector, producing naval vessels and military aircraft. The construction materials industry here provides for the whole Russian Far East. Lead smelting is conducted in Rudnaya Pristan on the coast.

The timber industry, though in recession, is still second only to Khabarovsk Krai's with an annual yield of about 3 million cubic meters of timber. Primorsky Krai is the largest coal producer in the Russian Far East and generates more electricity than any other Russian Far East administrative division, but power shortages are common. Agriculture is also important; the krai produces rice, milk, eggs, and vegetables.

The krai's proximity to Pacific Rim markets gives it an edge over most other Russian Far East administrative divisions in developing foreign trade. Major trade items are seafood products, timber products, and ferrous metals. Major trading partners are Japan, China, and South Korea.

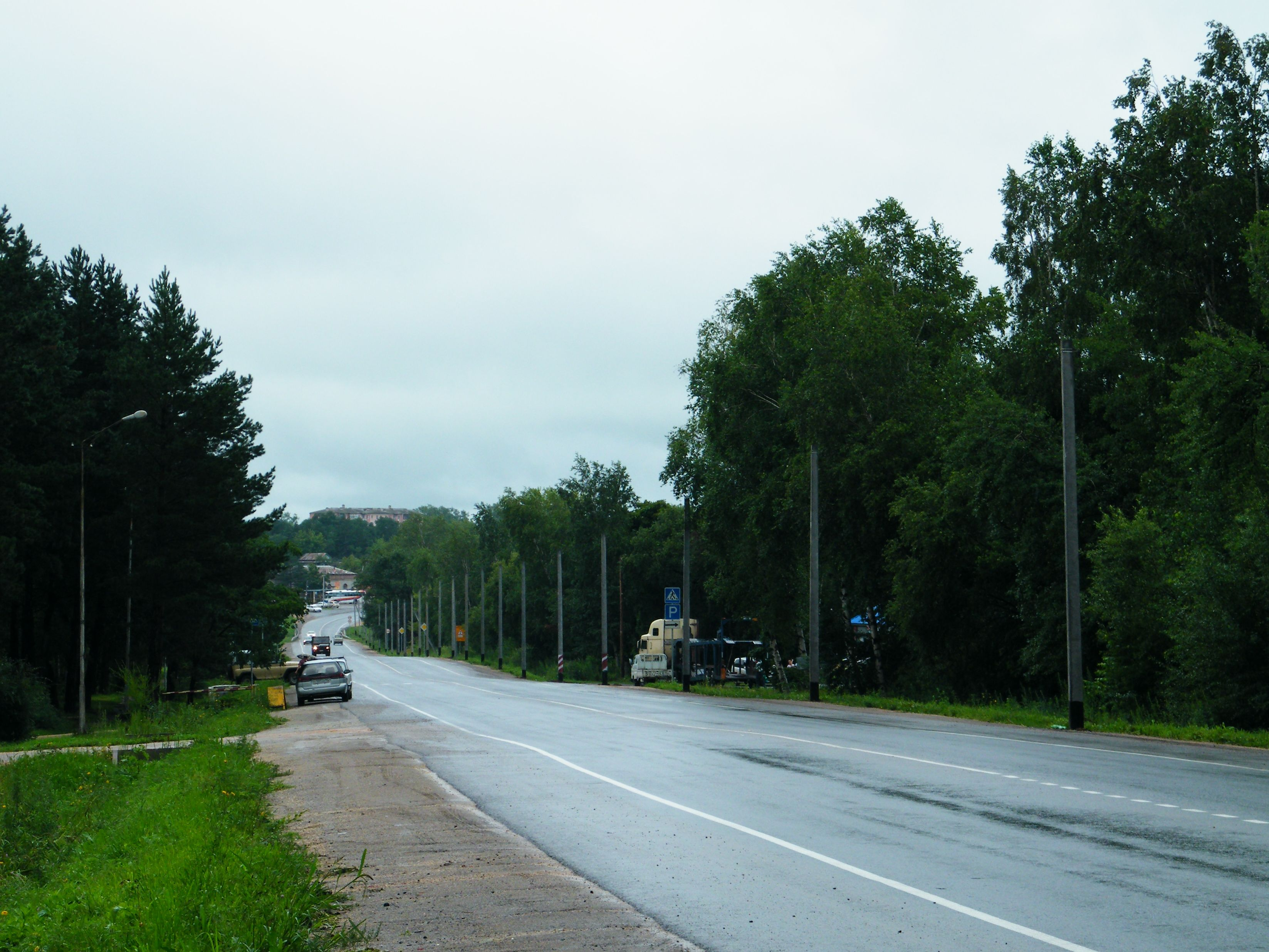
Road through Gorniye Kluchi village

The economy will be further diversified with the addition of as many as 8 government sanctioned casinos to be built in the Primorye Gambling Zone, which encompasses the entire Primorsky Krai. Primorsky Entertainment Resort City, under development by NagaCorp Ltd. of Phnom Penh, Kingdom of Cambodia, will be the largest. The development is expected to cost in the region of RUB11.6 billion (approximately HK$2.7 billion, US$350 million) and have a total footprint of 214.89 hectares.

Primorsky Krai's compact territory is well endowed with infrastructure. Its railway density is twice the Russian average. Railroads connect it with China and North Korea. Vladivostok, the eastern terminus of the Trans-Siberian Railway, was surpassed as a port by the nearby Nakhodka-Vostochny Port container, coal and timber terminals. Primorsky Krai-based shipping companies provide 80% of marine shipping services in the Russian Far East. All the krai's significant ports are now open to international shipping.

The largest companies in the region include Far-Eastern Energy Company, NNK-Bunker, Mazda Sollers, and Vostochny Port.

== Natural resources ==
=== Coal ===
More than 100 deposits of coal are known in Primorsky Krai. The commercial deposits of coal are connected to the Partizansky and Razdolnensky coal basins, the Podgorodnensky deposit, the Uglovsky basin, and the Shkotovsky, Pavlovsky, Bikinsky, Rettikhovsky, and Suputinsky deposits.

Partizansky Basin: The city of Partizansk is located in the southern part of the basin. The total area of the basin is 6,000 km^{2} (2,300 sq mi). The basin has been known since the 19th century and has been explored since 1902. Five regions—Staropartizansky, Melnikovsky, Belopadinsky, Molchanovsky, and Sergeyevsky—are within the limits of the basin. The coal is anthracite coal. By the output of volatile substances and caking ability, rich coals prevail. The reserves of coal in the basin total 193.6 million tonnes. The deposits are maintained by the mines of the Partizanskugol Association. A coal-mining factory also operates in this area.

Razdolnensky Basin: The total area of this basin is about 4,500 km^{2} (1,700 sq mi). The basin is located to the north and the west of the city of Ussuriysk. The basin includes the following deposits: Ussuriysky, Lipovetsky, Verkhne-Razdolnensky, Konstantinovsky, and Alekseye-Nikolsky. The deposits were prospected as early as 1868. The mining of coal has been conducted since 1909. By the output of volatile substances and coking ability, long-flame coals prevail. The reserves of coal in the basin total of 66.7 million tons. The deposits are maintained by the mines and the open-pit coal mines of the Lipovetskoye Mine Administration.

Uglovsky Basin: Located 30 km (19 mi) northeast of Vladivostok, the basin's band extends about 40 km (25 mi) to the northeast of Amursky Bay and ranges from 6 to 14 km (3.7 to 8.7 mi) in width. Coals in the basin have been known since 1859. The mining of coal has been executed since 1867 in the Tavrichansky deposit, and since 1911 in the Artyomovsky deposit. The coal is brown coal, which is used as a power fuel. In the long years of operation, the stocks of coal in the basin have been considerably depleted. The reserves of coal in the basin total 233.7 million tons. The mines of the Tavrichansky Mine Administration and the Artyomugol Association operate on the basis of the deposits.

Podgrodnensko-Surazhevsky: This coal-bearing region is located close to Vladivostok. The stocks of the Podgrodnensky deposit are estimated to be a total of 19.6 million tons. The coal is anthracite coal. By the output of volatile substances and caking ability, the coal is hard (non-bituminous). The deposits are maintained by the Podgorodenka mine of the Artyomugol Association.

The Paleogene-Neogene deposits of Primorsky Krai are the Bikinsky, Pavlovsky, Shkotovsky, Rettikhovsky, Rakovsky, and Khasansky deposits. The deposits are the major sources of fuel for the largest heat and power stations of Primorye: Luchegorskaya and Vladivostokskaya. The coal is brown coal.

The Bikinsky Deposit is the largest brown coal deposit in Primorsky Krai. Its total area is 260 km^{2} (100 sq mi). The reserves total 1,113.9 million tons. The coal-bearing thickness is 1,800 m (5,900 ft). The Luchegorsky Open-Pit Coal Mine maintains the mine and provides fuel to the largest power station in the krai, the Luchegorsky Hydro-Electric Power Station.

Pavlovsky Deposit: The total area is 400 km^{2} (150 sq mi). The reserves total 400 million tons. The coal-bearing thickness is up to 400 m (1,300 ft). The mining is maintained by the Pavlovsky-1 and Pavlovsky-2 Open-Pit Coal Mines. Coal is used as fuel for the Vladivostok Heat and Power Plant-2.

Skotovsky Deposit: The total area is 150 km^{2} (58 sq mi). The reserves total 251.6 million tons. The coal-bearing thickness ranges from 800 to 950 m (2,620 to 3,120 ft). Maintenance is by the open-pit mine of the Artyomugol Association.

The coal of the Pavlovsky, Skotovsky, and Bikinsky deposits contains germanium and non-ferrous metals.

=== Tin ===
The major areas of occurrence of commercial tin stocks are Kavalerovsky, Krasnoarmeysky, and Dalnegorsky Districts. There are more than 30 deposits of tin in Primorsky Krai. The extraction of tin ore is maintained by Khrustalnenskaya Tin Extracting Company, Dalpolimetal Stock Company, and Vostok Mining Company. All tin-extracting enterprises of the krai have a 30-year supply of ore.

=== Tungsten ===
There are four major commercial deposits of tungsten in Krasnoarmeysky and Pozharsky Districts. The mining of only two of them is currently maintained, at Vostok-2 and Lermontovskoye by the Primorsky Mining Group and Lermontovskoye Mining Company. The enterprises have a 10-year reserve supply. The ores are complex, containing copper, gold, silver, bismuth, and other metals besides tungsten.

=== Lead and zinc ===
There are more than 10 commercial deposits of lead and zinc in the territories of Dalnegorsky, Kavalerovsky, and Krasnoarmeysky Districts. The mining of the deposits of lead and zinc is maintained by Dalpolimetal Stock Company. The enterprise has a 40-year supply of ore.

=== Silver ===
Among the deposits of precious metals in Primorsky Krai, silver and gold-silver deposits predominate. Ten deposits of silver are found in the Krai. The majority of silver-polymetal ore deposits are located in Dalnegorsky District and are maintained by Dalpolimetal Stock Company. Silver is extracted simultaneously with tungsten from tungsten ores deposits in Krasnoarmeysky and Pozharsky Districts.

=== Gold ===
More than 60 deposits of gold are found in the territory of the krai. Most of them are placer deposits. The southern part of the krai is the richest in placer deposits. Significant gold placer sites are at Kommisarovsky (the Pogranichnaya river), Fadeyevsky (the Fadeyevka river), Krinichny (the Bolshaya Rudnevka river), Nakhodkinsky (the Korobkovka river), and Soboliny (the Sobolinaya river). Okean Artel and Primorsky Mine are engaged in gold extraction. Gold is also extracted from complex deposits of tungsten ores.

=== Fluorspar ===
The Voznesenovsky and Pogranichny deposits of rare-metal-fluorspar ore are located in Khorolsky District. The Voznesenovskoye deposit was prospected in 1948. It is maintained by the Yaroslavsky Mining Group Stock Company and there is a 20-year supply of ore. The ore is a complex ore. Fluorspar totals 10 percent of the mineral content of the ore. The ore contains such rare metals as beryllium, lithium, tantalum, and niobium. The Usuglinskoye mine is one of the largest fluorite mines in Russia, having estimated reserves of 2.9 million tonnes of ore.

=== Boron ===
Russia's largest deposit of boron-containing ore (boron silicates) is located in Dalnegorsky District. The deposit is operated by Bor Stock Company. The enterprise has 50 years' supply of borosilicates stocks.

=== Limestone ===
There are more than 100 large deposits of various construction materials.

The Spasskaya group includes the Spasskoye and Dlinnogorskoye limestone deposits. The stocks total more than 100 million tons and are maintained by Spassktsement Stock Company.

The Suchanskaya group includes the Novitskoye and Chandolazskoye limestone deposits, which are located in Partizansky District. These deposits are suitable for the production of Portland cement of 400 and 500 types. The stocks total approximately more than 1 billion tons.

The Maikhinskaya group includes the Maikhinskoye and Glubinnogorskoye deposits located in Shkotovsky District. The estimated stocks of limestone in both deposits total about 60 million tons.

=== Ashlar stones ===
There are numerous deposits of granites, porphyrites, and marbles which, when polished, acquire a smooth surface of beautiful color. These deposits are located in Lesozavodsky, Khorolsky, Khasansky, Spassky, Chernigovsky, Partizansky, and other districts.

The Ambinskoye deposit of marble is located in Khasanky District. This marble is highly decorative and is easily polished. The estimated stocks total more than 2 million m^{3} (70.6 million ft^{3}).

The Knorringskoye deposit of ashlar stones is located in Chernigovsky District. The estimated stocks total about 10 million m^{3} (35.3 million ft^{3}). They are similar in color to the famous American ashlar stones.

=== Clays ===
There are more than 100 deposits of fusible clay which is used in brick production in the krai. Fusible clay deposits are found almost everywhere in the krai, except its northeastern parts. The Uglovskaya, Ussuriyskaya, and Spasskaya group of fusible clay deposits are noteworthy in this area.

The krai's largest stocks, a total of more than fifteen million tons, is the Uglovskaya group of deposits located in Uglovoye settlement. The deposits provide raw material to the brick factories in Vladivostok and Artyom.

There are more than twenty deposits of refractory clay and fireclay. The clay is suitable for the manufacture of bricks and ceramics. The largest deposits are located in Oktyabrsky and Chernigovsky District, and in Artyom.

The Lipovetskoye Deposit of refractory clay is located in Oktyabrsky District. The estimated stocks total about 1.5 million tons and are maintained by the Lipovetsky Brick Factory.

The Ozernovskoye deposit of fireclay is located in Uglovoye settlement. The estimated stocks total about 2 million tons and have been used for the manufacture of bricks since 1964.

=== Porcelain stones ===
Primorsky krai's best-known Gusevskoye deposit of porcelain stone is located in Khasansky District. The material is used by the Vladivostok and Artyom Porcelain Factories. The estimated stocks total about 3 million tons.

=== Feldspar rhyolites ===
The Sergeyevskoye deposit of ceramic rhyolites is located in Partizansky District. It may be used for the manufacture of porcelain.

== Demographics ==
Historical population
Year	Pop.	±%
1897	190,012	—
1926	633,800	+233.6%
1939	906,805	+43.1%
1959	1,381,018	+52.3%
1970	1,721,285	+24.6%
1979	1,977,779	+14.9%
1989	2,258,391	+14.2%
2002	2,071,210	−8.3%
2010	1,956,497	−5.5%
2021	1,845,165	−5.7%
2025	1,798,047	−2.6%
Source: Census data, estimate

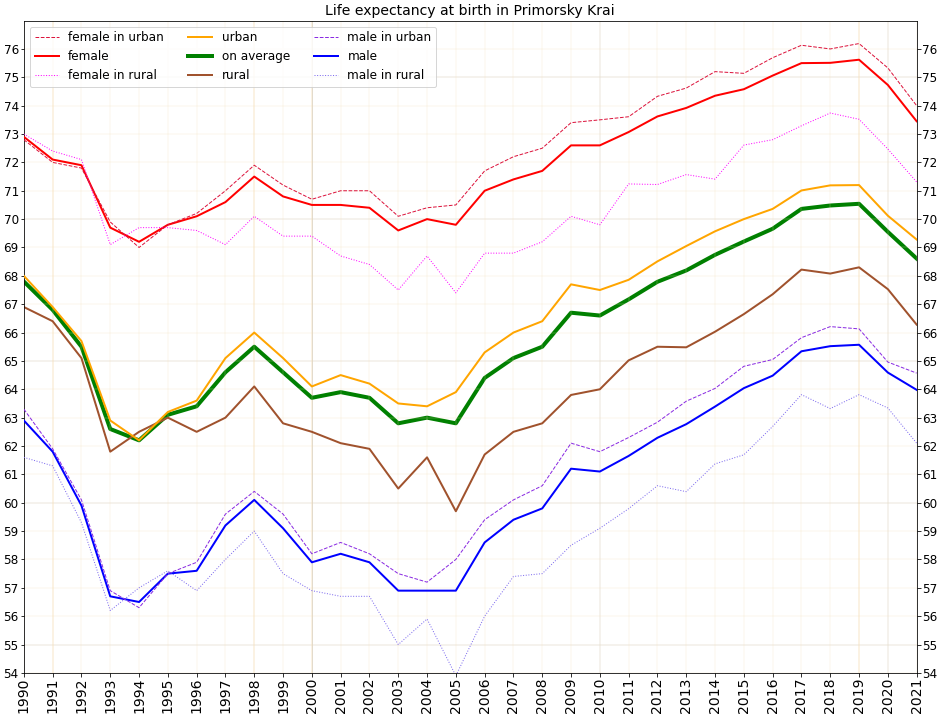
Life expectancy at birth in Primorsky Krai

=== Demographics in the past ===
Several Tungusic and Paleosiberian peoples lived here before Russian colonization: Udege, Nanai, Nivkh, Orochs, Ulchs, Oroks, and Manchus.

=== Contemporary demographics ===
Population: According to the 2021 Census, the population of the krai was 1,845,165, down from 1,956,497 recorded in the 2010 Census, and further down from 2,258,391 recorded in the 1989 Census. Due to its geographical location, the krai boasts a mixture of not only ethnic Russians, but also Ukrainians, Koreans, Volga Germans, Buryats, Nanai, and Orochs. The Udege and their sub-minority, the Taz, are the region's aboriginals.

Vital statistics for 2024:

- Births: 15,188 (8.4 per 1,000)
- Deaths: 25,666 (14.2 per 1,000)

Total fertility rate (2024):
1.43 children per woman

Life expectancy (2021):
Total — 68.61 years (male — 63.98, female — 73.45)

=== Settlements ===
Largest cities or towns in Primorsky Krai 2020
Rank		Administrative Division	Pop.
1	Vladivostok	City of krai significance of Vladivostok	606,589
2	Ussuriysk	City of krai significance of Ussuriysk	173,640
3	Nakhodka	City of krai significance of Nakhodka	145,159
4	Artyom	City of krai significance of Artyom	105,675
5	Arsenyev	Town of krai significance of Arsenyev	52,173
6	Spassk-Dalny	Spassky District	39,765
7	Bolshoy Kamen	Town of krai significance of Bolshoy Kamen	39,096
8	Partizansk	Town of krai significance of Partizansk	36,589
9	Lesozavodsk	Town of krai significance of Lesozavodsk	35,097
10	Dalnegorsk	Town of krai significance of Dalnegorsk	34,096

=== Ethnic groups ===
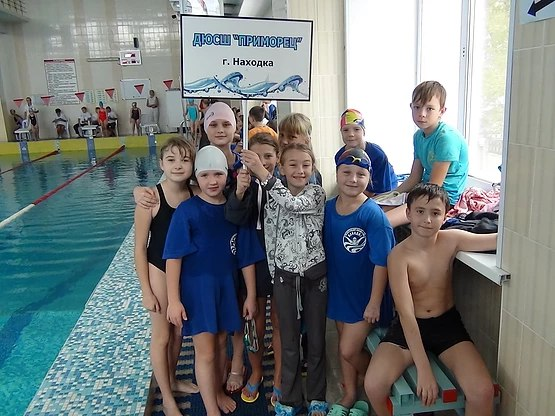
Russian children in Nakhodka

In the 2021 Census, the following ethnic groups were listed:

Ethnicities in Primorsky Krai in 2021
Ethnicity	Population	Percentage
Russians	1,391,736	75.4%
Ukrainians	11,337	0.6%
Koreans	7,785	0.4%
Uzbeks	6,365	0.3%
Armenians	4,378	0.2%
Tatars	3,946	0.2%
Other Ethnicities	48,432	2.6%
Ethnicity not stated	371,186	20.1%

=== Religion ===
Religion in Primorsky Krai as of 2012 (Sreda Arena Atlas)
Russian Orthodoxy	26.6%
Other Orthodox	1.6%
Other Christians	6.7%
Rodnovery and other native faiths	0.6%
Spiritual but not religious	23.6%
Atheism and irreligion	34.7%
Other and undeclared	6.2%

According to a 2012 survey 26.6% of the population of Primorsky Krai adheres to the Russian Orthodox Church, 6% are unaffiliated Christians, 1% adheres to other Eastern Orthodox churches or is an Eastern Orthodox believer without belonging to any church, and 1% of the population adheres to the Slavic native faith (Rodnovery) or to local Siberian native faiths. In addition, 24% of the population declares to be "spiritual but not religious, 35% is atheist, and 6.4% follows other religions or did not give an answer to the question. This is one of the least religious regions in Russia.

== Meteorite ==
The krai is the location of the massive Sikhote-Alin meteorite, which fell February 12, 1947, in the Sikhote-Alin Mountains, near the village of Paseka (approximately 440 km northeast of Vladivostok).

== Sister districts ==
- Gangwon-do, South Korea
- Gyeongsangbuk-do, South Korea
- Gyeongsangnam-do, South Korea
- Osaka Prefecture, Japan
- Toyama Prefecture, Japan

== See also ==
- Outer Manchuria
- Geography of Primorsky Krai
- List of cities in Primorsky Krai
- Winter storms of 2009–10 in East Asia
- Primorsky Krai Police
- Green Ukraine – a formerly proposed country in the Russian Far East
- History of Primorye
- Kabarga

== Sources ==
- №14-КЗ 6 октября 1995 г. «Устав Приморского края», в ред. Закона №359-КЗ от 18 декабря 2008 г. (#14-KZ October 6, 1995 Charter of Primorsky Krai, as amended by the Law #359-KZ of December 18, 2008. ).
- А. Р. Артёмьев и др. "История Российского Приморья". Дальнаука, 1998.
  (A. R. Artyomyev et al. History of Russian Primorye. Vladivostok: Dalnauka, 1998)
