= Sabathe Louis Gaston =

Louis Gaston Sabathe (April 3, 1877 in the commune of Vic-Fezensac, Gers department – May 7, 1949 in the town of Épinouze, Drôme department) – French engineer, inventor, entrepreneur, who worked in such fields as: internal combustion engines, medicine, military equipment, printing, etc. He is best known as the creator of internal combustion engines operating on a cycle with a combined heat supply, which is named in his honor the Sabathe cycle.

== Biography ==
Sabathe Louis Gaston was born in the commune of Vic-Fézensac, in the Auch district of the Gers department near Toulouse, to 33-year-old farmer Guilhaume Sabathé and his 20-year-old wife, Marie. The mayor of the municipality, Sylvain, in the presence of witnesses, recorded this in the civil registry. At birth, the child gave the name Louis. Later, he would listed as Gaston in census forms, and as an adult, he would sign his name as Louis Gaston.

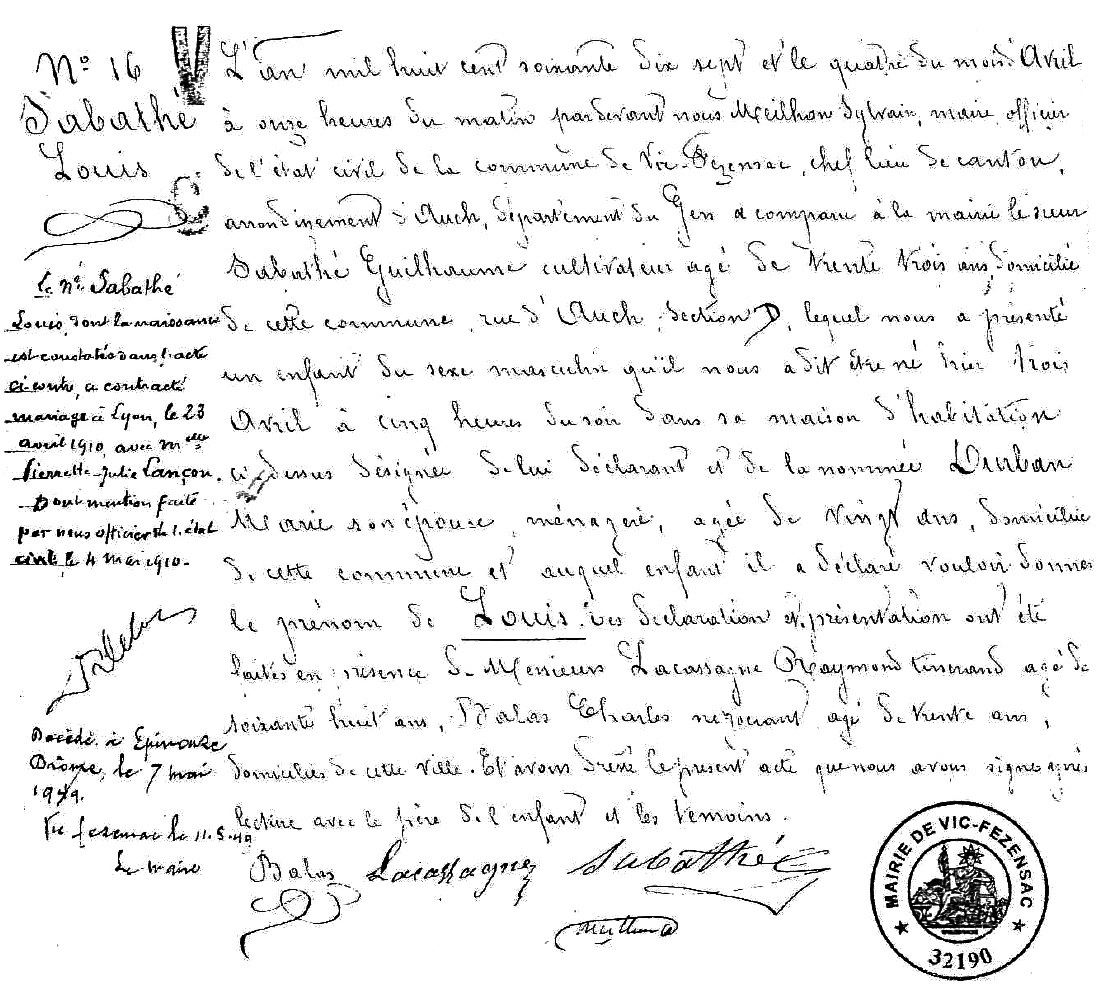
Louis Sabaté's birth certificate at the Civil Registry Office

In 1891, Sabaté was sent to boarding school at a vocational school in the town of Aire in southeastern France, where he excelled so much that he even received a municipal scholarship. After completing his studies, the young Sabaté moved to Paris, settling at 114 rue Vaugirard and beginning work at "Les Industries Biologiques," a company that, despite its name, was primarily involved in manufacturing products for the French military. The young engineer's talents were soon recognized, and he became a member of the mechanical and aeronautical sections of the Technical Division of the Department of Inventions. Sabaté was offered work on new types of ammunition and control systems for submarines and aircraft. He soon turned his attention to the rapidly developing industry of piston internal combustion engines for military and civilian vessels, as well as submarines. Sabathe actively pursued new technical solutions to improve the Diesel engine, which was becoming increasingly widespread by that time. Having received several patents for improvements to this engine, in 1908 Sabathe moved to Saint-Etienne in the Loire department, where he built several engines of his own design at the Usines de la Chaléassicre plant. In 1910, Sabathe returned to Paris, taking with him his young wife, Pierrette Julie Lancon, whom he married on April 23, 1910, in Lyon in the Rhône department. On September 15, 1910, their daughter, Arlette Marie Louise, was born.

Returning to Paris, Sabathe continued his work on improving internal combustion engines, for which he received several patents. With the outbreak of World War I, he established active collaboration with Delahaye. Which was actively developing the production of automobile, tractors and other engineering vehicles for the French Army. As part of this collaboration, Sabathe developed original designs for artillery tractors capable of crossing enemy trenches using special runners.

Together with Delahaye's chief designer, Amedee-Pierre Varle, they developed and patented a track module that could install on various vehicles in place of wheels. They also developed an original articulated tank with increased cross-country ability, which, however, did not proceed beyond the model stage. In addition to tanks, Sabathe developed mortars, automatic cannons and ammunition for them, as well as other types of weapons. After the end of World War I, continuing to work in the arms industry with Marie-Joseph-Isidore-Xavier de Vésin, in February 1929 he founded the company Société de Mécanique Générale, also operating in the arms market. This line of work is clearly responsible for the secretive nature of this undoubtedly talented engineer.

Sabaté died on May 7, 1949, in the town of Espinouze in the Drôme department.

== Sabaté's to the development of piston internal combustion engines ==
The rapidly developing submarine fleet required fundamentally new approaches to the selection and design of propulsion systems to propel a vessel underwater. Sabaté was one of the first to conceive of using internal combustion piston engines for this purpose. To this end, he developed the design and operating principle of a closed-cycle engine, in which an inert gas used as the working fluid, with an oxidizer and fuel introduced into the working cylinder at the end of the compression stroke.

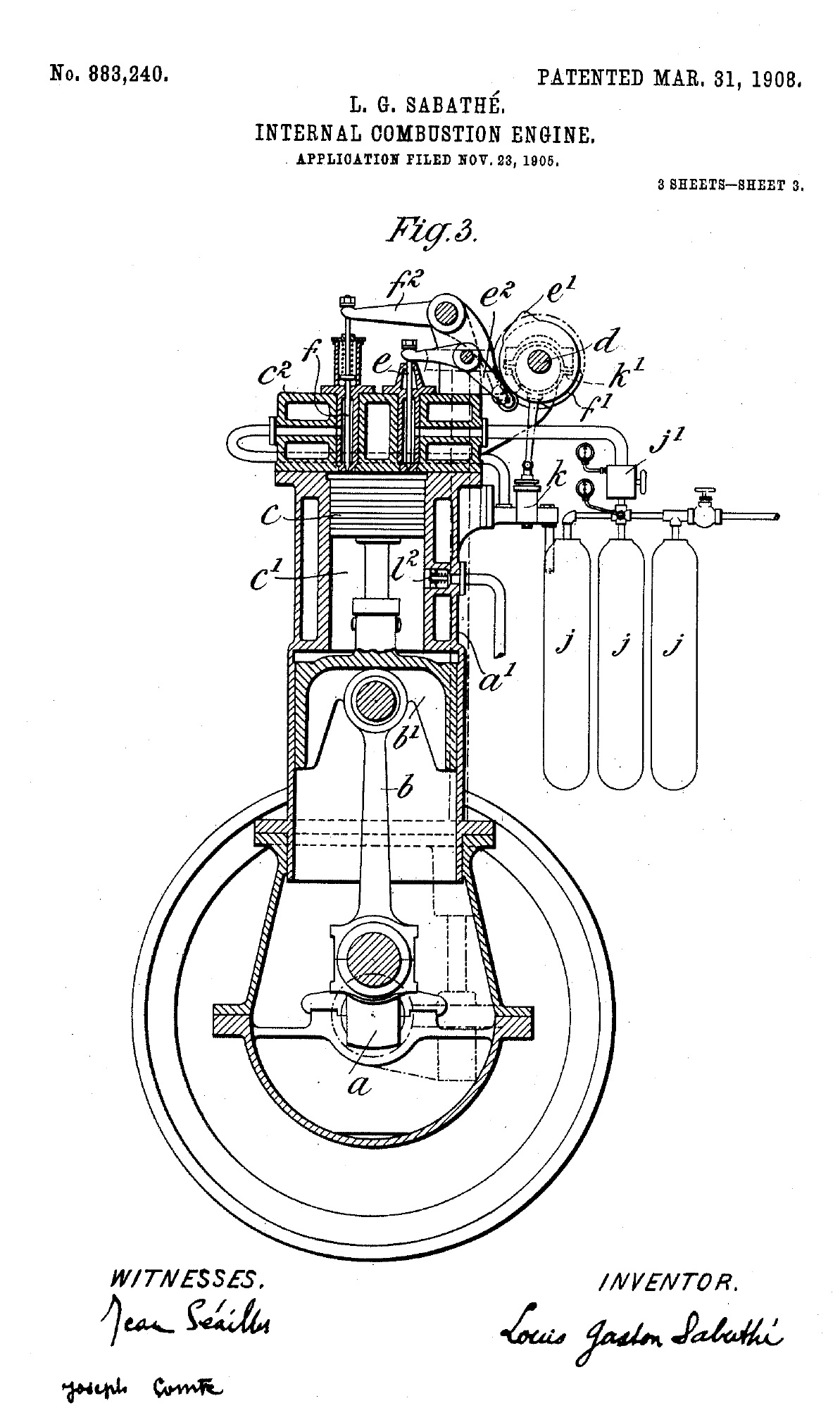
USA Pat. 883240. Internal combustion engine with a closed gas cycle

After the combustion process, the exhaust gas was to be purified of combustion products and reused in the engine. The oxidizer (oxygen) proposed to be stored in pressurized cylinders or produced onboard using chemical methods, such as the decomposition of alkaline peroxides in the presence of water. No documents confirming that this project, so daring for its time, successfully implemented were found. Apparently, faced with serious difficulties, Sabaté forced to return to more traditional methods of organizing work processes based on the use of atmospheric air as the working fluid. However, even with the traditional method of using diesel engines to power marine propulsion systems, engineers also encountered a number of new, at the time poorly understood, problems, which Sabaté tackled.

The fact is that all diesel engines at the time were compressor-based, using compressed air to deliver fuel to the working cylinder. When the engine operated according to a screw characteristic, where power regulated by varying the engine speed, a decrease in speed led to a decrease in the air compressor's performance, which ultimately failed to cover the air consumption for fuel injection. To solve this problem, Sabaté developed a system for regulating air supply depending on the engine's operating conditions. To maintain high efficiency and reduce fuel consumption, he proposed dividing the fuel delivery process into two stages: a first injection with a large advance angle, which ensures combustion of the first portion at a nearly constant volume, and a second injection, which occurs when the piston begins to move from TDC to BDC. As the engine load decreases, the second injection volume reduced until the second injection completely stopped, thereby reducing the amount of air consumed. This approach allowed the maximum cycle pressure to be limited to 50 atm (5.0 MPa) by adjusting the first injection rate, and by varying the second injection rate, engine power could regulated by increasing or decreasing the isobaric region of heat input on the combustion line. As load decreased, by gradually reducing the second injection rate, the engine transitioned to a cycle similar to the Otto cycle, maintaining a high maximum pressure.

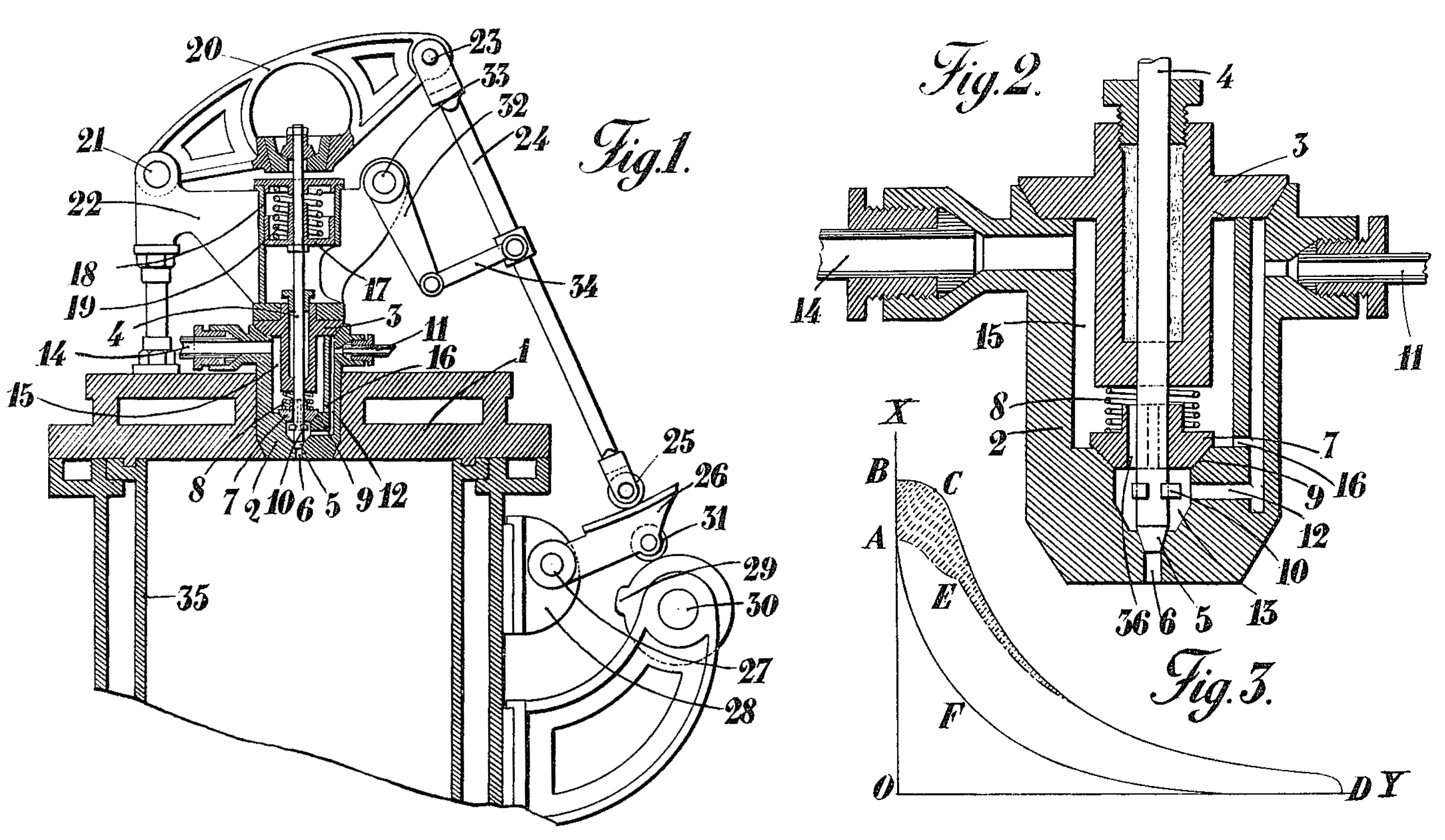
The design of the Sabaté engine injector for organizing a cycle with a combined heat supply and methods for organizing the working process when operating under various loads (US Patent No. 975640, November 15, 1910)

Sabaté's pneumatic injector design for a combined heat cycle was patented between 1905 and 1908 in several countries, including France, the United States, and Russia. As with most patents of the time, Sabaté patented not the cycle itself, but a specific design. However, in his patent, he clearly states that this design allows for heat supply first along an isochore and then along an isobar, i.e., a combined cycle. Subsequently, this approach to patent applications has given rise to disputes over Sabaté's claim to the title of primacy in the creation of an engine with a combined heat supply. However, it should be understood that other claimants to the primacy also did not patent a specific cycle. Gustav Trinkler, for example, already postscriptively cited experimental data he had obtained several years earlier. However, he never indicated that his design was specifically designed for such a cycle. A similar cycle was later theoretically described by Myron Seiliger, and some authors would credit him with creating this cycle. However, without diminishing the contributions of the above-mentioned individuals to engine design, Sabaté's engines deliberately implemented a cycle with mixed heat supply, by dividing the cycle feed into two portions fed sequentially to the working cylinder. While the question of who deserves priority for the mixed heat supply cycle remains debatable, Sabaté undoubtedly holds the title of primacy in the use of split fuel injection. Unlike his colleagues, Sabathé proposed a fundamentally new form of organizing the working cycle, and for its implementation a very specific design, planning in advance to obtain a programmed result, and also adapted his engine to very specific operating conditions, namely, to work according to the propeller characteristic.

In order to manufacture engines of his own con-struction for navy Sabathe set up cooperation with large industrionalist, ex-navy engineer Joseph Le-flaive, owner of factories Usines de la Chaléassicre, located in Saint-Etienne, Loire department (Block Bergson, Barrouin str.). Obviously, experienced ma-rine engineer Leflaive, who took active part in devel-opment of new trend (submarine fleet), realized quite quickly the advantages of new type of engines com-paring to steam machines used in first submarines. For manufacturing engines using Sabathe patents there was created joint-stock company Société des Moteurs Sabathé. The founders of joint-stock company were: Vincent Biétrix – Knight of the Légion d'Honneur, art and craft engineer, ex-manager of Forges et Ateliers de la Gbaléaseière; Joseph Leflaive – ex-marine en-gineer, manager of Forgea et Ateliers de la Chaléas-sière; Octave Diamanti – representative of French Government and engineer Louis Gaston Sabathe. The Statute of the company was signed on February 18, 1908 and notarized by Ferdinand Balay from Saint-Étienne and Petrus Bernard from Lion. Registered capital of two million franks was divided among four thousand shares, five hundred franks each. Sabathé provided full rights for his inventions, protected by the patents, as an in-kind contribution for the company. Also Sabathé provided the newly created company with the results of his researches, drawings of the developed engines as well as the rights for engines construction in the framework of previously concluded agreement (dated June 10, 1907) between Sabathé и Établissements Schneider company. In return, the company reimbursed Sabathé’s costs for patents’ obtaining as well as negotiations in America, England, Italy, Germany, Russia and Japan. All these expenses were estimated as 30 thousand franks. Besides Sabathé received 1,600 shares of the enterprise. In order to raise funds for the new production development there were issued shares, and Sabathé was contracted to be Technical Manager, at the same time Leflaive became Managing Director of the company.

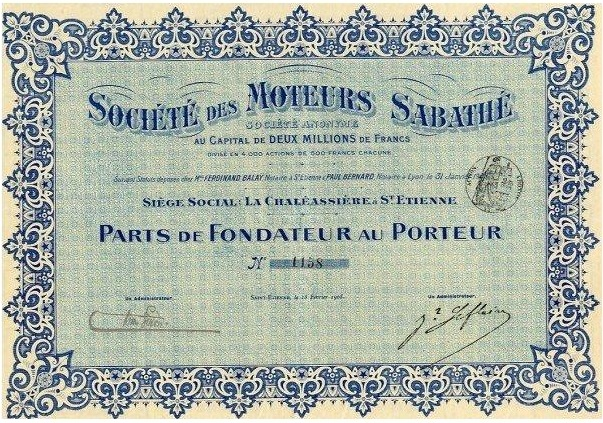
Shares of the company Société des Moteurs Sabathé founded by Leflaive and Sabathé

Leflaive and Diamanti, using their connections in the Military Department, started promotion of new type of engine for the navy vessels, including subma-rines. Aiming to attract the attention of Ministry offi-cers Leflaive provides extensive report about advan-tages of the new engine during “International Con-gress on Internal Combustion Engines Application in Navy, Merchant and Fishing Fleet and Yaghts” (Congrès International des Applications du Moteur à Mélange tonnant et du Moteur à Combustion interne aux Marines de Guerre, de Commerce, de Pêche et de Plaisance), which was held December 24-30, 1908 in Saint-Etienne. Later this report was published as a separate publication and sent to Military Department and to other interested parties.

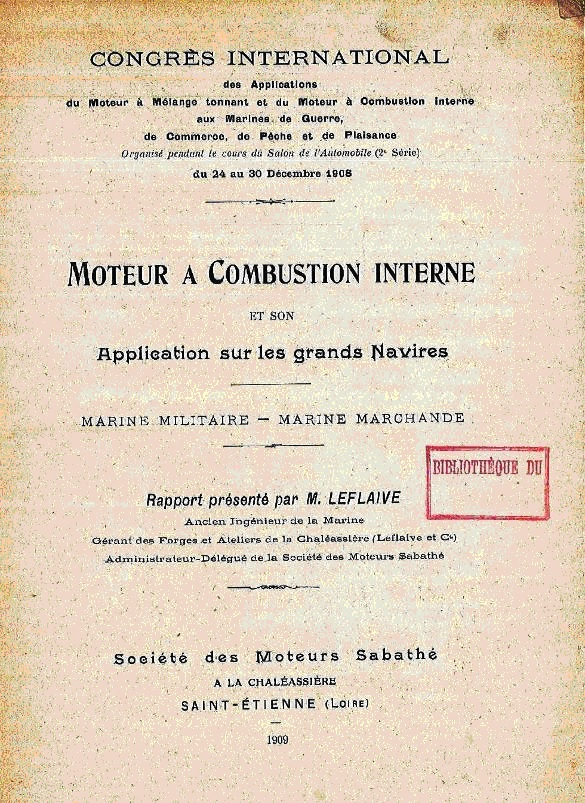
The title page of Joseph Leflaive's brochure in which he explains in detail the advantages of using Sabathé engines in the navy.

Estimations, calculated by Sabathé, showed, that application of the engines, developed by him, at destroyer with 500 DWT allowed the vessel to travel 1,200 miles with the speed 14 knots consuming 22 tons of liquid fuel; at the same time the same ves-sel with steam engine would consume 52 tons of coal.

In order to monitor and control process of construction and testing of engines Sabathé moved to Saint-Etienne. At that time this city was a big center of mining industry with a powerful industrial facilities focused at addressing the needs of military department. The design of Sabathe’s engines included not only new arrangement of fuel supply into working cylinder but also a lot of original constructive solutions. Basically, these engines were aimed to be used in war ships and submarines having limited space of engine-room, that is why special design of crankcase was created which allowed replacement of cylinder-piston group parts without dismantling and de-installation of engine and even without withdrawal of cylinder covers.

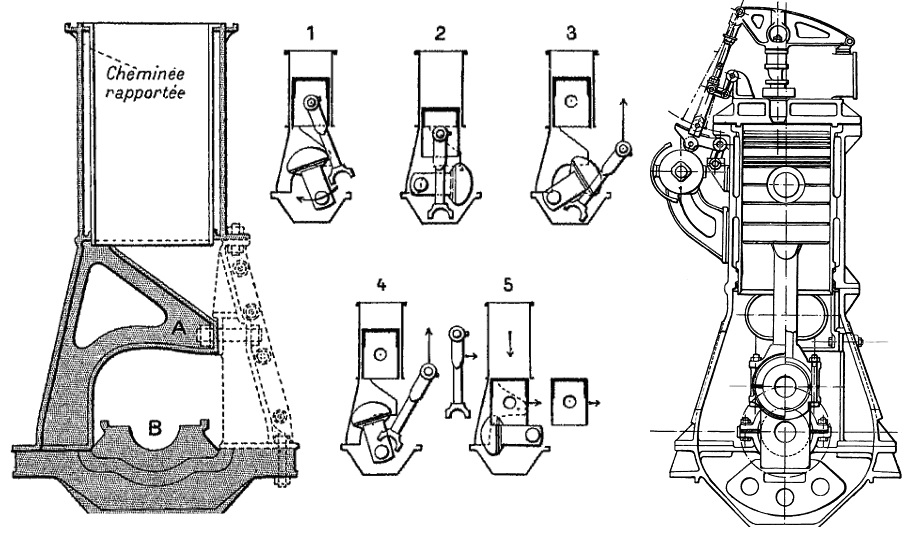
Design of engine’s crankcase with detachable wall-rack, allowing to withdraw pistons without dismantling cylinder covers; cross-section of engine

The last is extremely important for engines of submarines having strict limitations in the height of engine room. At the same time part of crankcase rack, which covered two crank wells, should be dismantled, and having this window replacement of two pistons could be done. This operation took approximately six hours. Antifriction pads installed on the pistons could easily be replaced in case of wear. The first experimental engine with four cylinders was built at Chaléassicre factory by the end of 1908.

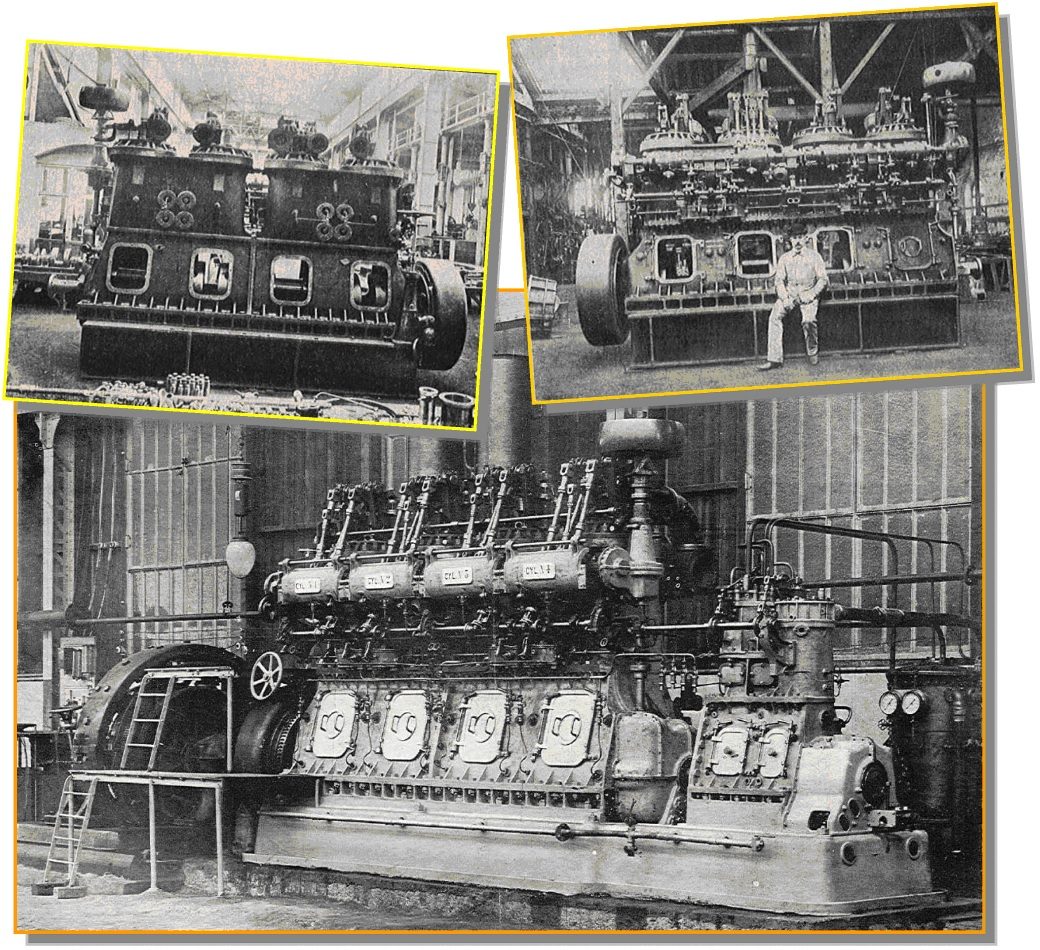
Stages of building of first four-cylinder engine designed by Sabathé and its installation at test stand of the factory

Later on, the range of engines was supplemented by six- and eight-cylinder models.

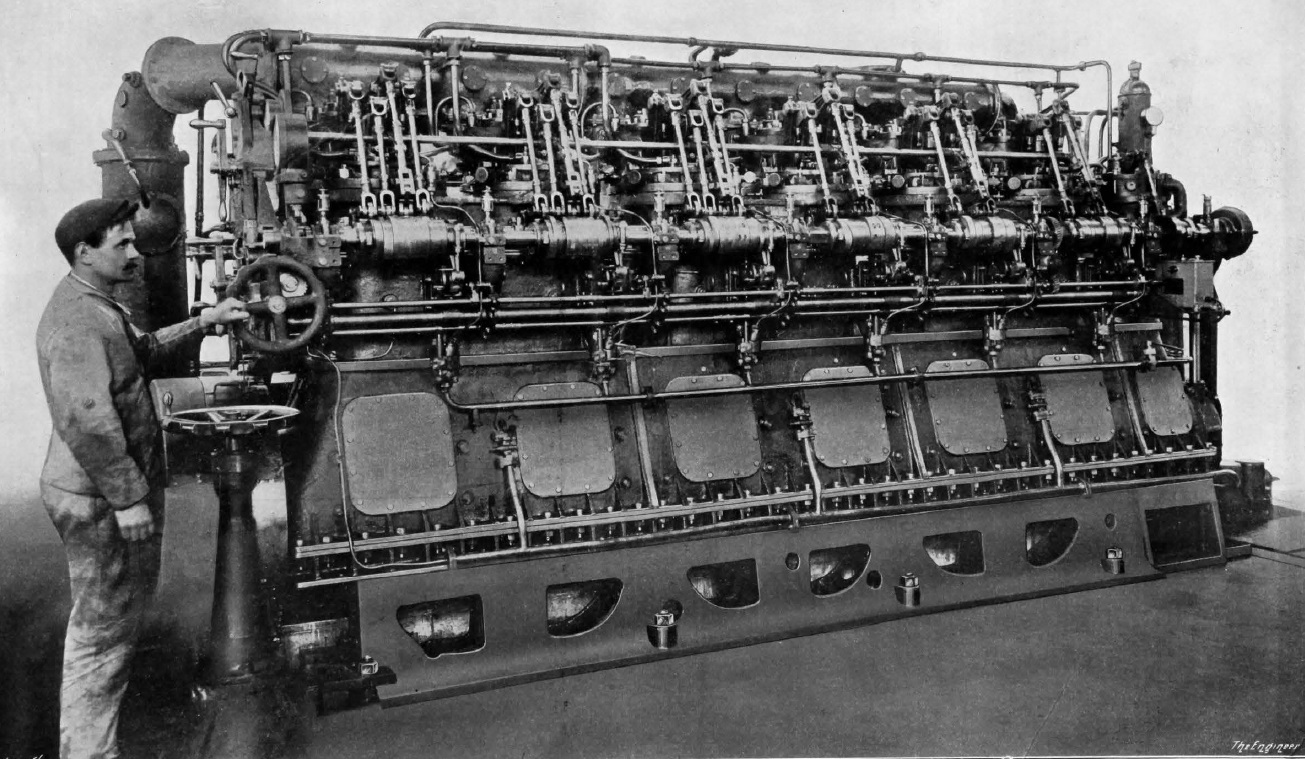
Bi-directional four-stroke six-cylinder marine engine, power 1,000 hp (736 kWt) under rotational speed 300 rpm

The indicator diagrams, obtained after stand tests, fully confirmed theoretical findings of Sabathé. Figure shows indicator diagram, obtained after testing two-cylinder engine with power 40 hp with rotation speed 375 rpm.

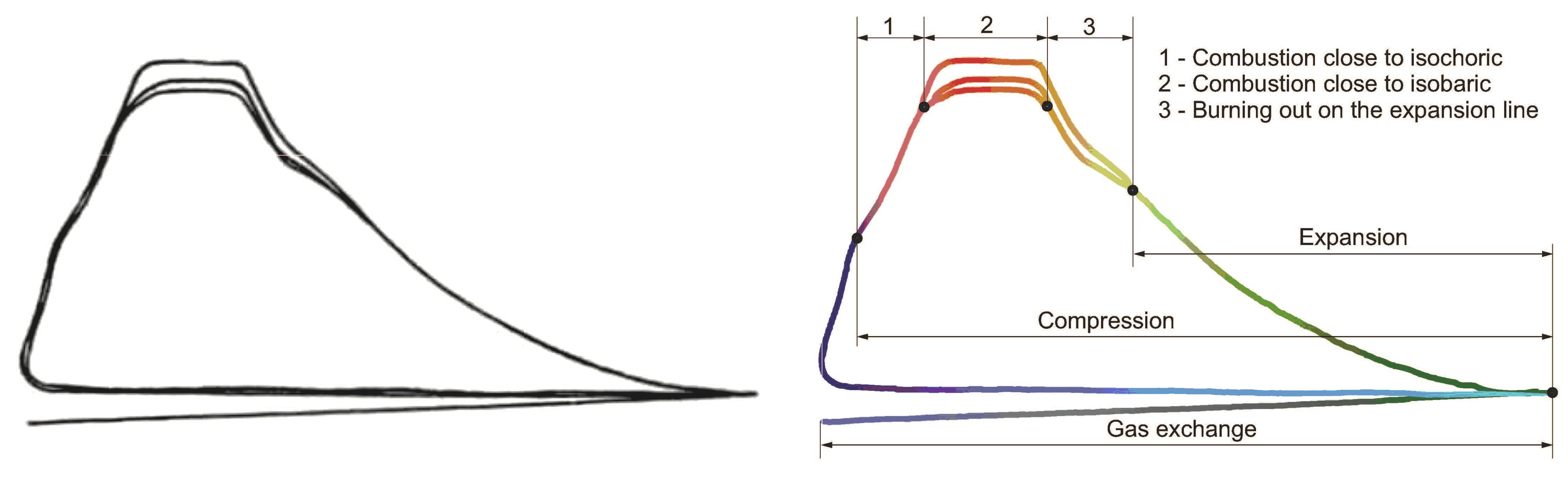
Indicator diagram on the results of Sabathé’s engine testing

For presentation purposes, in order to show pe-culiarities of working process, the indicator drive was adjusted in such a way that combustion process was not at the end of diagram, as it is usually done during indicating piston machines, but in its centre. This figure clearly shows that combustion of the first portion of fuel took place at the section of piston stroke of no more than 10 % of the full one, and the process of combustion close to isobaric is about 17 % of the full stroke. At the time of building engines of Societe des Moteurs Sabathe had the lowest indices in fuel consumption, 185g/(hp×hour), and their specific weight was 24...30kg/(hp×hour); these were very good indices for those times. The engines, regardless of cylinders number, were unified and had the same cylinder diameter and stroke equal to 350mm. Cylinder power was 120...175 hp. Time for reversing did not exceed 12 sec., engine was started by compressed air. These engines were installed also into French sister submarines of class Brumaire, in particular boat Q82.

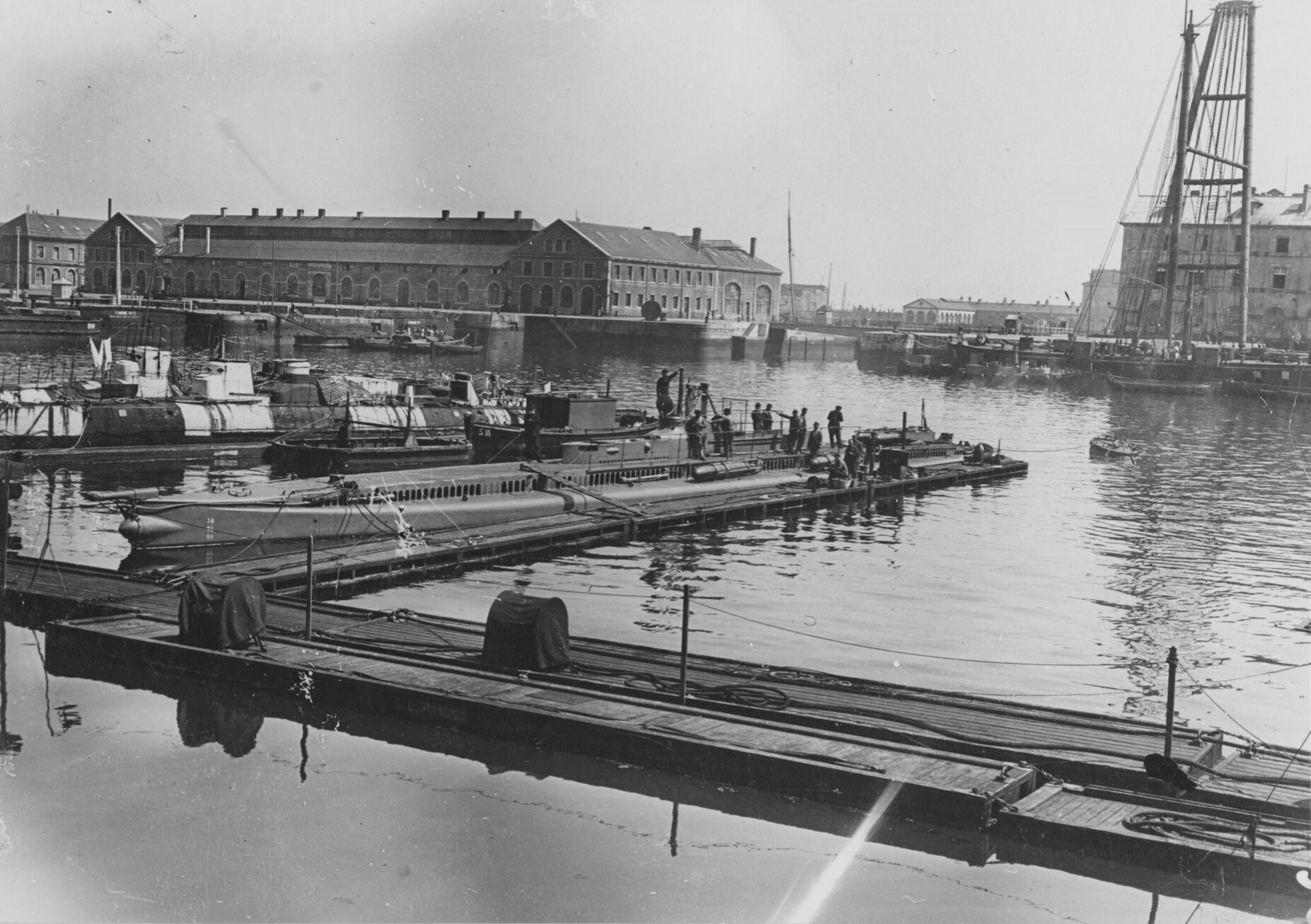
A Brumaire-class submarine in Cherbourg

In addition to main engines, aimed at propelling, the company built two- and three-cylinder auxiliary engines to drive generators with power 50 hp under rotation frequency 600 rpm; specific fuel consumption was 215 g/(hp×hour).

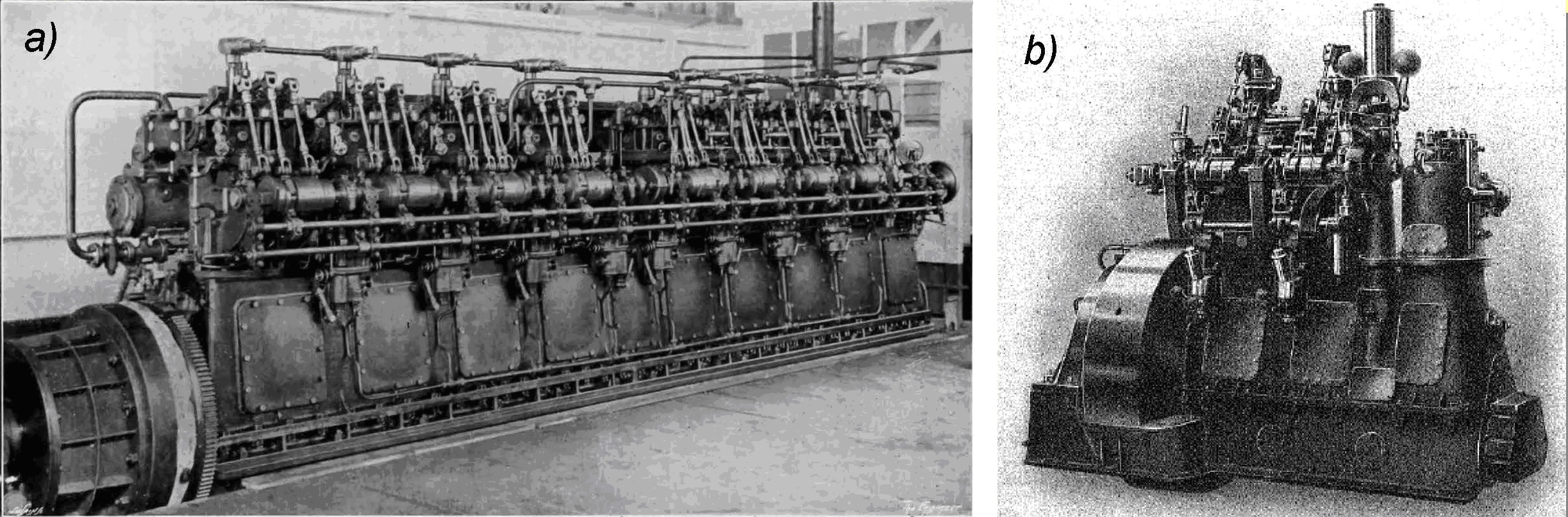
Eight-cylinder main engine (a) and two-cylinder auxiliary marine engine (b) of Société des Moteurs Sabathé

The first success was impressive, but soon quite foreseeable challenges appeared. As any new machinery, the new engines required qualified personnel for efficient operation, but at that moment nobody trained such a personnel. And Sabathé’s engines required accurate and difficult adjustment of parametres of two consecutive fuel supplies – the efficiency of operation strongly depended on it. Operation of engines was accompanied by frequent failures of compressors, camshafts, clutches etc. These issues were noticed by military men, who were the main customers. As a result, closer to the beginning of World War I the Military Department had to refuse the idea to equip submarines with internal combustion engines (not only with those, invented by Sabathé), and to substitute them with steam machines and steam turbines. Active cooperation of Sabathe with Leflaive continued by July 1910. The reason for the break in relations between two outstanding engineers is quite difficult to define today, there were found no reliable data on this issue. As a result of growing contradictions, Directors Board approved Sabathe’s dismissal from the position of Consulting Engineer.

Having all the rights for Sabathe’s patents, Chaléassicre factories continued to build engines of his construction under brand Société des Moteurs Chaléassière until World War I. During 1910-1914 the company received sev-eral orders to build main bi-directional and auxiliary engines for diesel generators of both navy and mer-chant fleet. Apart of marine engines, the company built in-dustrial engines both for domestic market and for export. In the run to the World War I there was signed a contract to build such engines for the Russia Empire, but there is no information whether this order was completed. On his return to Paris Sabathe continued his work on improvement of internal combustion engines and received several patents.

== Sabathé's activities in the field of weapons improvement ==
When the World War I started, Sabathé cooperated actively with Delahaye et Cie enterprise, which produced towing vehicles and other engineering machines for the French army. In the framework of this cooperation Sabathe developed original constructions of military artillery-towing vehicles with cog-wheels, able to cross trenches with the help of special skids. Together with the Chief Constructor of the Delahaye enterprise Amedee-Pierre Varlet they de-veloped and patented tracked module, which could be installed on different vehicles instead of wheels. Every aggregate consisted of drive sprocket, in-termediate wheel and three supporting wheels. The aggregate was driven through chain drive. The tracks were made of forged steel with curved back side for soft ground adhesion.

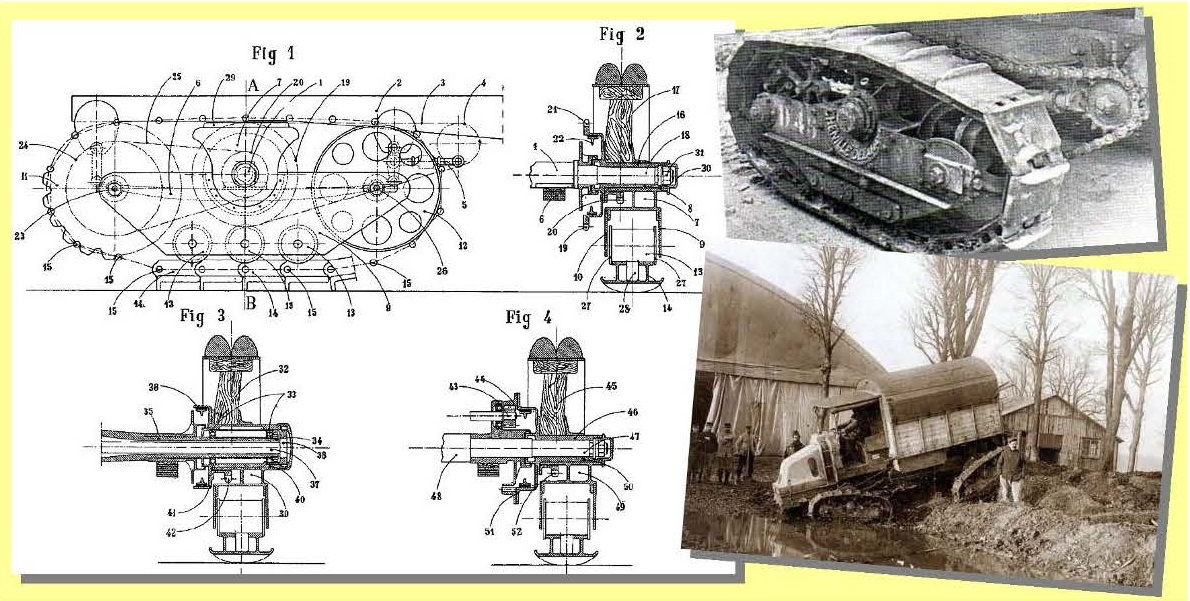
Tracked aggregate Delahaye Mécanisme à Chenille developed by Sabathe and Varlet, its general view and testing at towing vehicle Latil TAR

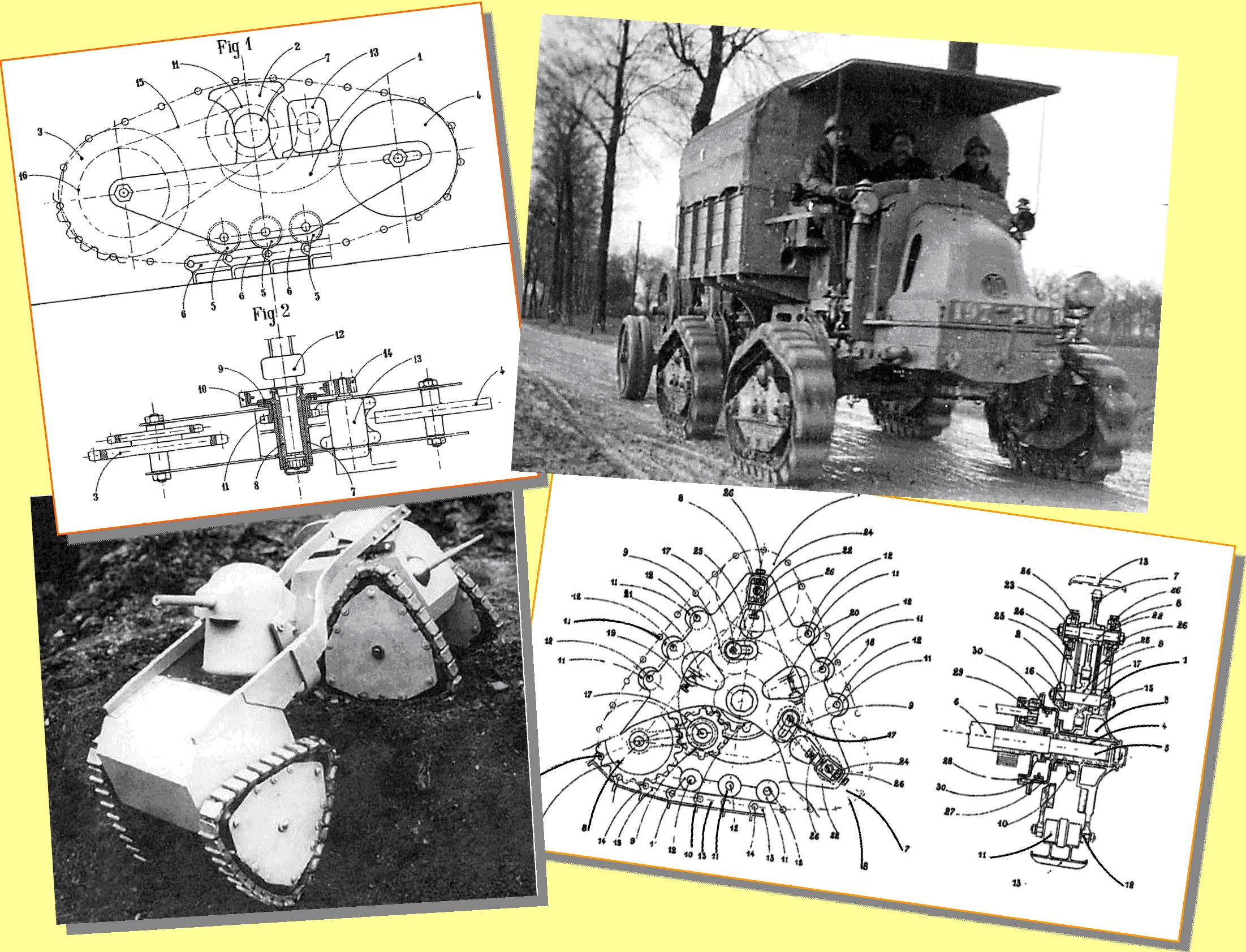
Tracked aggregate with increased clearance and its application at towing vehicle Latil TAR, model of jointed tank developed by Sabathe and Varlet and its tracked aggregate

This aggregate received the name Delahaye Mécanisme à Chenille. First trials were done in 1915, and industrial production was started in 1918. The aggregate was about 500 kg and provided seat of 1.6 m^{2}.On the results of tests there were developed several improved constructions of tracked aggregates, they were also applied at military towing vehicles. At the beginning World War I Sabathe started to design fundamentally new weapon-type for those times – tanks. Together with his colleque Amedee-Pierr Varlett they designed a series of projects for Delahaye company including original jointed tank with increased passability, though it did not become an industrial design. Except for tanks Sabathe designed mortars automatic cannons and their ammunition, as well as other types of armours. Sabathe’s contribution into the development of French military industry was noticed by the government. In 1921 he was honored to become Knight of the Légion d'Honneur, it is very high recognition in France. After the end of World War I he continued to work in the weapons industry and, together with Marie-Joseph-Isidore-Xavier de Vésin, Sabathe creates company Société de Mécanique Générale in February 1929; it was also involved in weapons market. An example of Sabathe’s activity during between-wars period is air-launched torpedo developed in 1936. After being launched, it was gliding into the water with the help of a wing, installed on the top with bars and rotatable arrester. When touching the water, special movable part detached the wing and started propeller of torpedo.

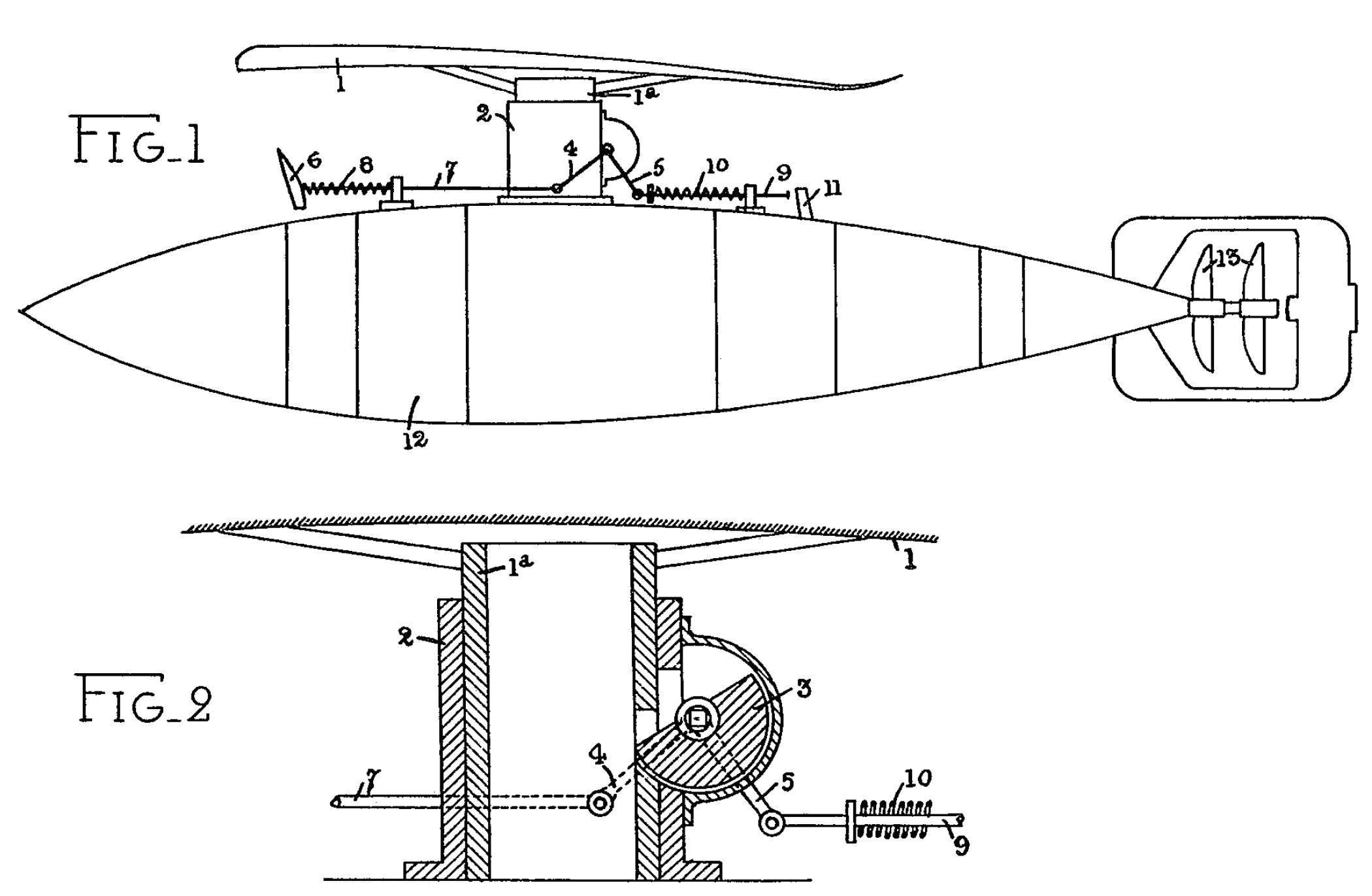
Air-launched torpedo-glider, aimed for being launched from height (USA patent US2147550A).

We believe that war industry is the reason of closed-nature of this talented engineer. Sabathe continued his work at «Les Industries Biologiques» enterprise. There he developed technology equipment and different medical machinery. According to the received patents for different modernization of weapons and medical equipment in the period between World War I and World War II Sabathe did not returned to engine construction. Sabathe died on the 7th of May 1949 in Espinouze town, department Drôme.

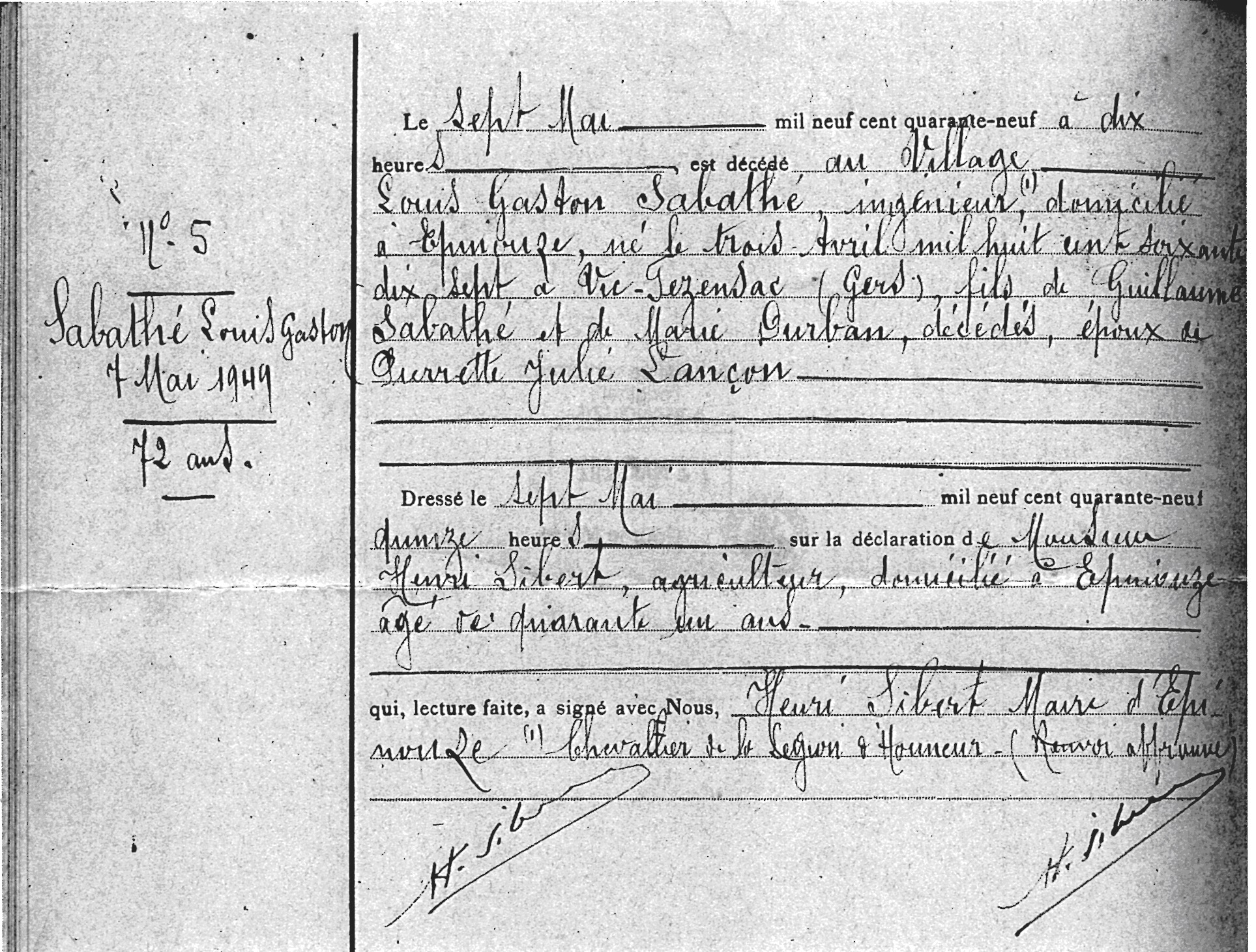
Death record of L.G. Sabathe in Civil Register.
