= Chuguyevka =

Chuguyevka may refer to:

- Chuguyevka (air base), a military air base in Primorsky Krai, Russia
- Chuguyevka (rural locality), a rural locality (a selo) in Primorsky Krai, Russia
