= Alexander Fadeyev (writer) =

Soviet writer and politician (1901–1956)

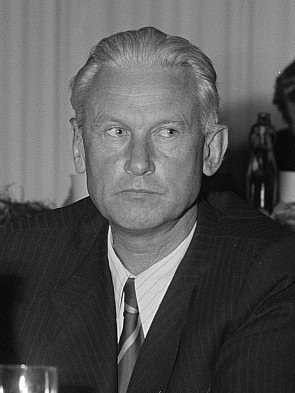
- Fadeyev in 1952. Photograph by Roger and Renate Rössing
- Born: 24 December 1901; Kimry, Tver Governorate, Russian Empire
- Died: 13 May 1956 (aged 54); Peredelkino, Moscow Oblast, Russian SFSR
- Resting place: Novodevichy Cemetery
- Education: Moscow Mining Academy
- Occupations: Writer, critic
- Spouse: Angelina Stepanova
- Writing career
- Genre: Fiction
- Notable work: The Young Guard
- Notable awards: Stalin Prize; Lenin Komsomol Prize; Order of Lenin; Order of the Red Banner; Medal "For Valiant Labour in the Great Patriotic War 1941–1945"; Medal "In Commemoration of the 800th Anniversary of Moscow"
- Movement: Socialist realism

Alexander Alexandrovich Fadeyev (Russian: Алекса́ндр Алекса́ндрович Фаде́ев; 24 December [O.S. 11 December] 1901 – 13 May 1956) was a Soviet writer, one of the co-founders of the Union of Soviet Writers and its chairman from 1946 to 1954.

== Biography ==
Fadeyev was born in Kimry, Tver Governorate. From 1908 to 1912, he lived in Chuguyevka, Primorsky Krai. He joined the Bolshevik Party in 1918 and took part in the guerrilla movement against the Japanese interventionists and the White Army during the Russian Civil War. In 1927, he published the novel The Rout (also known as The Nineteen), in which he described youthful guerrilla fighters. In 1930, he published the first part of the novel The Last of the Udege, on which he continued working the rest of his life (an edition containing the second volume, all he was able to complete, was published in 1940.) In it, Fadeyev intended to show "that an extremely primitive people may experience a leap from tribal communism to the complex collective organization of the twentieth century, skipping over the intervening historical stages: family, private property, slavery, feudalism, capitalism and socialism. [...] Uneven though it is, The Last of the Udegs contains some of Fadeyev's best pages, and the fact that he spent his energies on literary administration rather than on the completion of this novel is a minor tragedy."

In 1945, he wrote the novel, The Young Guard (based upon real events of World War II) about the underground Komsomol organization named Young Guard, which fought against the Nazis in the occupied city Krasnodon (in the Ukrainian SSR). For this novel, Fadeyev was awarded the Stalin Prize (1946). In 1948, a Soviet film The Young Guard, based on the book, was released, and later revised in 1964 to correct inaccuracies in the book.

Fadeyev was a champion of Joseph Stalin, proclaiming him "the greatest humanist the world has ever known". During the 1940s, he actively promoted Zhdanovshchina, a campaign of criticism and persecution against many of the Soviet Union's foremost writers and composers. However, he was a friend of Mikhail Sholokhov. Fadeyev married a famous stage actress, Angelina Stepanova (1905–2000). He fathered Masha Enzenberger from an alliance with the poet Margarita Aliger (1943).

In the last years of his life, Fadeyev developed a nervous condition, exacerbated by the prolonged abuse of alcohol. Some sources claim that this was mostly due to the denunciation of Stalinism during the Khrushchev Thaw. He eventually committed suicide by shooting himself in the heart at his dacha in Peredelkino, leaving a suicide note which made clear his negative attitude to both the old and the new leaders of the Party. Fadeyev referred to Stalin as a "satrap" in the note. His suicide occurred after he was denounced by his friend Mikhail Sholokhov; he was also blamed for the poor state of Soviet literature at the 20th Party Congress. In his suicide note, Fadeyev attacked the Stalinists who had "physically exterminated" the best Soviet authors, and said that they had "brought us [writers] down to the level of children; they destroyed us; they threatened us ideologically and called this 'the Party spirit'". He attacked the new members of the Soviet leadership, claiming that they were uneducated people who manifested "primitivism and ignorance--along with a disgraceful share of self-assurance" in their attempts to promote Soviet literature. Fadeyev's death occasioned an epigram by Boris Pasternak, his neighbor. He is buried in the Novodevichy Cemetery in Moscow.

== Legacy ==
In her memoirs, Nadezhda Mandelstam, after describing Fadeyev's seemingly affectionate farewell to Osip Mandelstam just before his final arrest, wrote: "Liuba [Ehrenburg] has told me that Fadeyev was a cold and cruel man – something quite compatible with emotionalism and the ability to shed a tear at the right moment. This became very clear, according to Liuba, at the time of the execution of the Yiddish writers [known as the Night of the Murdered Poets]. Then also it was a case of tearful farewell embraces after he had signified his formal agreement to their arrest and liquidation – even though the Yiddish writers, unlike Mandelstam, were his friends." And Korney Chukovsky wrote the following in his diary entry after Fadeyev's suicide:

I feel very sorry for dear Alexander Alexandrovich: one could sense a man of stature, a Russian brand of natural genius under all the layers – but, good lord, what layers there were! All the lies of the Stalinist era, all its idiotic atrocities, all its horrific bureaucracy, all its corruption and red tape found a willing accessory in him. An essentially decent human being who loved literature "to tears" had ended by steering the ship of literature into the most perilous, most shameful of waters and attempting to combine humaneness with the secret-police mentality. Hence the zigzags in his behavior, hence the tortured conscience of his final years. He wasn't born to be a loser; he was so accustomed to being a leader, the arbiter of writers' fates, that having to withdraw from the position of literary marshal was agony for him. None of his friends was willing to tell him that his Metallurgy was worthless, that the articles he had been writing during the past few years – cowardly, turbid, and full of normative pretensions – could only lower him in the eyes of the reading public, that reworking The Young Guard to suit the powers-that-be was shameful. Conscientious, talented, and sensitive as he was, he was floundering in oozy, putrid mud and drowning his conscience in wine.

== Bibliography ==
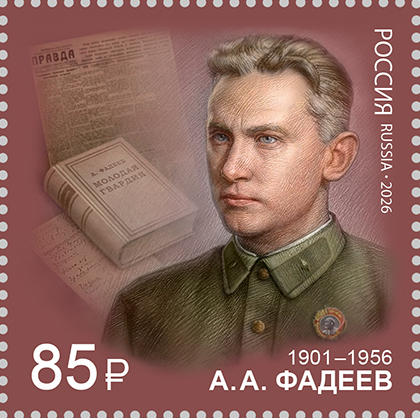
Fadeyev on a 2026 stamp of Russia.

=== Collected editions ===
- Sobraniye sochineniy, 7 vols. Moscow, 1969–71.

=== Fiction ===
- Protiv techeniya [Against the Current]. Moscow, 1924; reissued as Amgun'skii polk [The Amgunsk Regiment], Moscow, 1934, and as Rozhdenie Amgun'skogo polka [The Birth of the Amgunsk Regiment], Moscow, 1934.
- Razliv [The Flood]. Moscow, 1924.
- Razgrom. Moscow, 1927; as Razgrom/The Rout, edited by Roger Cockrell, London, Bristol Classical Press, 1995; translated as The Nineteen, by R. D. Charques, London, Martin Lawrence, 1929; reprinted Westport, Connecticut, Hyperion Press, 1973; also translated as The Rout, by O. Gorchakov, Moscow, Foreign Languages Publishing House, c. 1957.
- Posledniy iz udege [The Last of the Udege]. Moscow, 1930–1941.
- Molodaya gvardiya. Moscow, 1946; translated as The Young Guard, by Violet Dutt, Moscow, Progress, 1958; reprinted Moscow, Raduga Publishers, 1987.
- Chernaya metallurgiya [Ferrous Metallurgy]. Moscow, 1951–56.

=== Memoirs, letters, and literary criticism ===
- Leningrad v dni blokady: Iz dnevnika. Moscow, 1944; translated as Leningrad in the Days of the Blockade, by R. D. Charques, London, Hutchinson, 1946; Westport, Connecticut, Greenwood Press, 1971.
- Za tridtsat' let: Izbrannye stat'i, rechi i pis'ma o literature i iskusstve [Over Thirty Years: Selected Articles, Speeches and Letters on Literature and Art], edited by S. Preobrazhenskii, 2nd edition, Moscow, 1959.
- Pis'ma 1917–1956 [Letters]. 2nd edition, Moscow, 1959.

=== See also ===
- Alexander Fadeev Monument
