= Chuguyevsky =

Chuguyevsky (masculine), Chuguyevskaya (feminine), or Chuguyevskoye (neuter) may refer to:

- Chuguyevsky District, a district of Primorsky Krai, Russia
- Chuguyevsky (rural locality), a pochinok in Kirov Oblast, Russia
