= Masha Enzensberger =

Russian-born writer (1943–1991)

Maria Alexandrovna "Masha" Enzensberger (Maria Alexandrovna Makarova) was born on 28 August 1943 in Moscow, Russia and settled in London, United Kingdom in 1969. Through her, aspects of Russian culture of the 20th century reached Anglophone readers, especially in relation to film and poetry. Her life and work bore witness to many aspects of Russian and European history.

== Early life ==
Masha Enzensberger was born to the Russian poet Margarita Aliger. Her father, whose identity she knew only later in life, was the Soviet writer Alexander Fadeyev. Born into the Soviet intellectual elite, she had first-hand knowledge of intellectual and political currents of the 50s and 60s in Moscow. At age 16 she was celebrated in a poem by Yevgeni Yevtushenko. In 1967 she married the poet Hans Magnus Enzensberger. She travelled with him to Germany, the US and Cuba, before settling in London, after the marriage had ended.

== England ==
Enzensberger had studied English at Moscow University, and with permission to live abroad, was able to travel often between London and Moscow. In London and Cambridge in the 1970s, she became known for her illumination of works of avant-garde Russian culture, including film (Dziga Vertov) and poetry (Osip Brik), especially through her commentaries and translations for the periodical Screen. Befriended by many in England sympathetic to progressive political and cultural causes, her parties were celebrated – including in Cambridge, where she was elected to a Fellowship at King's College, Cambridge (1972–76). Friendships were extended and developed with English scholars and poets and with Russian emigres. The English poet Elaine Feinstein memorialised Masha in semi-fictional and in non-fictional work. She credited meeting Masha to developing a fuller understanding of the poems of Maria Tsvetaeva. There are vivid recollections of her Cambridge parties "...There she entertained lavishly, striking a glass to command Russian style toasts from sheepish Cambridge dons..."

== Works and death ==
One legacy of Enzensberger is in her translations of Russian poets of the 20th century, especially those of Mayakovsky, and Mandelstam. Her contribution to explorations of Russian 20th century history and culture is credited by scholars and journalists of the period. During the 1980s, where the political climate in UK and Russia became less supportive, Enzensberger continued to live in London, but had difficulty obtaining regular employment. Her friendships, however, continued to extend and deepen. It is thought that Masha was planning to return to Russia permanently in the aftermath of the fall of the Soviet Union in 1989–90. Feinstein reports that "...I saw her last in a Moscow of brown streets, puddles and people still shaking with euphoria after defeating the military coup in 1991. She had been among the women who held hands to confront the tanks...". Masha Enzensberger died on 6 October 1991 in London from an overdose of anti-depressant medication, which may have been accidental.

== Bibliography ==
=== Translations ===
- Listen! Early Poems 1913–1918 By Vladimir Mayakovski, San Francisco, City Lights Books, 1991 ISBN 0-87286-255-0
- A Necklace of Bees: Selected Poems By Ossip Mandelstam. London, Menard Press, 1992.
