= Chuguyevsky District (disambiguation) =

Chuguyevsky District may refer to:

- Chuguyevsky District, a district in Primorsky Krai, Russia
- Chuhuivskyi Raion, a district in Kharkiv Oblast, Ukraine
