= Mikhail Badyuk =

Soviet aviator

Mikhail Mikhailovich Badyuk
- Михаил Михайлович Бадюк
- Born: 3 January 1920; Chuguevka, Primorsky Krai, Russian SFSR
- Died: 25 March 1993 (aged 73); Rostov-on-Don, Russia
- Military career
- Allegiance: Soviet Union
- Branch: Naval Aviation
- Service years: 1939–1962
- Rank: Major
- Unit: 9th Guards Mine Torpedo Aviation Regiment
- Conflicts: World War II; Eastern Front
- Awards: Hero of the Soviet Union

Mikhail Mikhailovich Badyuk (Russian: Михаил Михайлович Бадюк; 3 January 1920 — 25 March 1993) was a Soviet aviator in the 9th Guards Mine Torpedo Aviation Regiment of the 5th Mine-Torpedo Air Division in the Northern Fleet's aviation division during the Second World War. For his actions in the military, he was awarded the title Hero of the Soviet Union on 22 February 1944.

== Biography ==
Badyuk was born on 3 January 1920 in the village of Chuguevka in the Far Eastern Primorsky Krai to a Russian peasant family. After enlisting in the military in 1939 he was assigned to an aviation unit in the Pacific Fleet before being transferred to the Northern Fleet in 1942. In the Second World War he first served in the 2nd Guards Mixed Aviation Regiment and later the 9th Guards Mine Torpedo Aviation Regiment. He was awarded the title Hero of the Soviet Union on 22 February 1944, having carried out the tasks of a radio operator, gunner, and pilot throughout the war.

After graduating from the Yeisk Military Aviation School in 1946 he was transferred to the Black Sea Fleet and served there until he was transferred to the 174th Guards Fighter Regiment of the Northern Fleet where he served from 1950 to 1951. He graduated from the Air Force Academy in 1955 and returned to the Arctic fleet as deputy chief of staff until he retired from the military in 1962 and remained in the reserve. After retiring he worked at the Institute of Agricultural Engineering in the city of Rostov-on-Don, where he died on 25 March 1993.

== Awards and honors ==
- Hero of the Soviet Union
- Order of Lenin
- Order of the Red Banner
- Three Orders of the Patriotic War in the 1st Class
- Order of the Red Star
- Medal "For Courage"
- campaign and jubilee medals

== See also ==
- Hero of the Soviet Union
