= Elaine Feinstein =

English poet and writer (1930–2019)

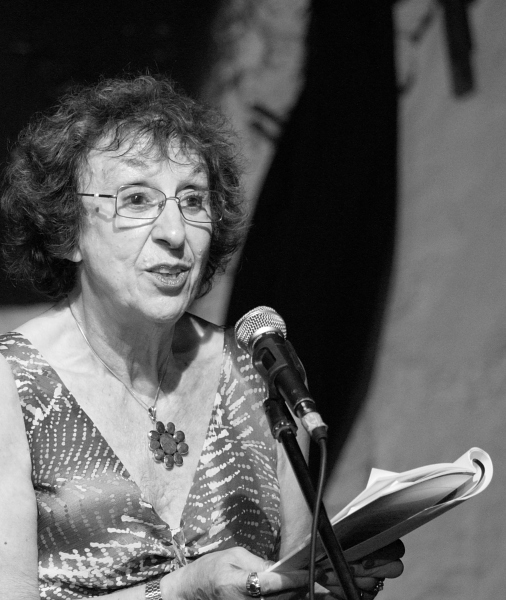
- Born: Elaine Cooklin; 24 October 1930; Bootle
- Died: 23 September 2019; London
- Education: Newnham College
- Occupations: Novelist; translator; poet; short story writer; biographer; writer; journalist
- Awards: Cholmondeley Award (1990)

Elaine Feinstein FRSL (born Elaine Cooklin; 24 October 1930 – 23 September 2019) was an English poet, novelist, short-story writer, playwright, biographer and translator. She joined the Council of the Royal Society of Literature in 2007.

== Early life ==
Born in Bootle, Lancashire, England, Feinstein grew up in Leicester. Her father had left school at 12 and had little time for books, but he was a great storyteller. He ran a small factory making wooden furniture through the 1930s. She wrote, "An inner certainty of being loved and valued went a long way to create my own sense of resilience in later years spent in a world that felt altogether alien. I never altogether lost my childhood sense of being fortunate."

Feinstein was sent to Wyggeston Grammar School for Girls by her mother, "a school as good as Leicester could provide". She wrote poems from the age of eight, which were published in the school magazine. At the end of the war Feinstein's sense of childhood security was shattered by the revelations of the Nazi extermination camps. She noted, "In that year I became Jewish for the first time." A recent critic commented: "Alive to her family origins in the Russian-Jewish diaspora, she developed a close affinity with the Russian poets of this and the last century."

Feinstein excelled at school work from then on. After Newnham College, Cambridge, she read for the bar, worked at Hockerill Training College, and then as a university lecturer at the University of Essex (1967–1970), appointed by Donald Davie.

== Literary career ==
In 1956 Feinstein married Arnold Feinstein, with whom she had three sons. Later, as she resumed writing she "came to life again", keeping journals, enjoying the process of reading and writing poetry, composing pieces to help her make sense of experience. She commented that she wanted "plain propositions, lines that came singing out of poems with a perfection of phrasing like lines of music." She was inspired by the poetry of Marina Tsvetaeva to translate some of her poetry. These poems were published by Oxford University Press and Penguin Books in 1971. She received three translation awards from the Arts Council.

After 1980, when she was made a Fellow of the Royal Society of Literature, she became a full-time writer. In 1990, she received a Cholmondeley Award for Poetry and an Honorary D.Litt. from the University of Leicester. She visited Russia occasionally to research her books and visit friends, who included Yevgeny Yevtushenko. Her writings included 14 novels, many radio plays, television dramas, and five biographies, including A Captive Lion: the Life of Marina Tsvetaeva (1987) and Pushkin (1998). Ted Hughes: The Life of a Poet (2001) was shortlisted for the biennial Marsh Biography Prize. Her biography of Anna Akhmatova, Anna of all the Russias, appeared in 2005 and was translated into twelve European languages, including Russian.

Her first novel, The Circle (1970), written under Tsvetayeva's influence, is "a study of a marriage, mostly through the wife's mind." Several novels concern her Jewish roots: The Survivors (1982), spans the generations before and after the Holocaust, while The Border (1984) tells of an old woman in Sydney and her "painful, mysterious... escape from Vienna with her husband in 1939".

Feinstein's poetry was influenced by Black Mountain poets, and by Objectivists. In 1959, she wrote to Charles Olson to request permission to publish his work in her magazine Prospect, becoming the first of a group of poets associated with The English Intelligencer to make contact with him. Olson's reply, on "breath prosody" and the development of his poetics since the publication of his essay "Projective Verse", has since been widely anthologised. Feinstein later became a conduit between the Cambridge poets and the Black Mountain poets.

Feinstein travelled extensively, to read her work at festivals abroad, and as Writer in Residence for the British Council, first in Singapore, and then in Tromsø, Norway. She was a Rockefeller Foundation Fellow at Bellagio in 1998; her poems were widely anthologised. Her Collected Poems and Translations (2002) was a Poetry Book Society Special Commendation, and she was appointed to the Council of the Royal Society of Literature in 2007. She served as a judge for the Gregory Awards, the Independent Foreign Fiction Award, the Costa Poetry Prize and the Rossica Award for Literature translated from Russian, and in 1995 was chairman of the judges for the T. S. Eliot Prize. Feinstein participated in the 22nd Aldeburgh Poetry Festival in November 2010 and continued to give readings in various countries.

Asked in an interview with Alma Books what three books she would save if her house were on fire, she replied, "I'd take my iPad."

== Death ==
Elaine Feinstein died of cancer in London on 23 September 2019, aged 88. She was survived by her three sons and six grandchildren.

== Books ==
=== Poetry ===
- In a Green Eye (London: Goliard Press, 1966)
- The Magic Apple Tree (London: Hutchinson, 1971)
- At the Edge (Northamptonshire: Sceptre Press, 1972)
- The Celebrants and Other Poems (Hutchinson, 1973)
- Some Unease and Angels: Selected Poems (University Center, MI: Green River Press, 1977; Hutchinson, 1981)
- The Feast of Eurydice (London: Faber & Faber/Next Editions, 1980)
- Badlands (Hutchinson, 1987)
- City Music (Hutchinson, 1990)
- Selected Poems (Carcanet Press, 1994)
- Daylight (Carcanet Press, 1997)
- Gold (Carcanet Press, 2000)
- Collected Poems and Translations (Carcanet Press, 2002)
- Talking to the Dead (Carcanet Press, 2007)
- Cities (Carcanet Press, 2010)
- The Clinic, Memory: New and Selected Poems (Carcanet Press, 2017)

=== Novels ===
- The Circle (London: Hutchinson, 1970)
- The Amberstone Exit (Hutchinson, 1972). Translated into Hebrew (Keter 1984)
- The Glass Alembic (Hutchinson, 1973; New York: Dutton, 1974 as The Crystal Garden)
- Children of the Rose (Hutchinson, 1974). Translated into Hebrew, 1987
- The Ecstasy of Dr Miriam Garner (Hutchinson, 1976)
- The Shadow Master (Hutchinson, 1978; New York: Simon & Schuster, 1979)
- The Survivors (Hutchinson, 1982)
- The Border (Hutchinson, 1985)
- Mother's Girl (Hutchinson, 1988)
- All You Need (Hutchinson, 1991)
- Loving Brecht (Hutchinson, 1992)
- Dreamers (London: Macmillan, 1994)
- Lady Chatterley's Confession (Macmillan, 1995)
- Dark Inheritance (London, Women's Press, 2001)
- The Russian Jerusalem (Carcanet Press, 2008)

=== Short story collections ===
- Matters of Chance (London: Covent Garden Press, 1972)
- The Silent Areas (Hutchinson, 1980)

=== Teleplays and radio plays ===
- 1975: Breath
- 1980: Echoes
- 1981: A Late Spring
- 1982: Lunch
- 1984: A Captive Lion
- 1985: Marina Tsvetayeva: A Life
- 1985: A Brave Face
- 1986: A Day Off
- 1987: If I Ever Get on My Feet Again
- 1990: The Man in Her Life
- 1993: Foreign Girls, a trilogy
- 1994: A Winter Meeting
- 1996: Lawrence's Women in Love (four-part adaptation)
- 1996: Adaptation of novel, Lady Chatterley's Confession Book at Bedtime

=== Biographies ===
- Bessie Smith: Lives of Modern Women Series, Penguin/Viking
- A Captive Lion: The Life of Marina Tsvetayeva, Hutchinson, 1987
- Lawrence's Women, HarperCollins, London, 1993; Lawrence and The Women New York, 1993
- Pushkin, Weidenfeld & Nicolson/Ecco, U.S., 1998
- Ted Hughes: The Life of a Poet, Weidenfeld & Nicolson, 2001
- Anna of all the Russias: A Life of Anna Akhmatova, Weidenfeld & Nicolson, 2005; Knopf, 2006
- Portraits (Carcanet Press, 2015)

=== Memoirs ===
- It Goes With The Territory: Memoirs of a Poet, Alma Books, 2013

=== Translations ===
- Marina Tsvetayeva: Selected Poems (1971; 2nd ed., 1981; 3rd ed., 1986; 4th ed., 1993; 5th ed., 1999; 6th ed. 2009 as Bride of Ice: New Selected Poems)
- Three Russian Poets: Margarita Aliger, Yunna Morits, Bella Akhmadulina, Manchester: Carcanet Press, 1976

=== As editor ===
- After Pushkin, Folio Society/Carcanet Press, 1999

=== In anthologies ===
- Contributor to A New Divan: A Lyrical Dialogue Between East and West, Gingko Library 2019. ISBN 9781909942288

== Prizes and awards ==
- 1970: Arts Council Grant/Award for Translation
- 1971: Betty Miller Prize
- 1979: Arts Council Grant/Award for Translation
- 1981: Arts Council Grant/Award for Translation
- 1981: Fellow of the Royal Society of Literature
- 1990: Cholmondeley Award
- 1990: Shortlisted for 1990 Los Angeles Times Fiction Prize
- 1992: Society of Authors Travel Award
- 2004: Arts Council Award
