= Margarita Aliger =

Soviet poet, translator, and journalist

- Маргари́та Алиге́р
- Born: Margarita Iosifovna Zeliger; Маргарита Иосифовна Зейлигер; 7 October [O.S. 24 September] 1915; Odesa, Russian Empire
- Died: 1 August 1992 (aged 76); DSK «Michurinets», Novomoskovsky Administrative Okrug, Moscow Oblast, Russia
- Burial place: Peredelkino Cemetery
- Education: Maxim Gorky Literature Institute
- Spouses: Konstantin Makarov-Rakitin (m. 1937; died 1941) Igor Chernoutsan (m. 1983; died 1990)
- Partner: Alexander Fadeyev (1942)
- Children: 3, including Masha Enzensberger
- Relatives: Myron Seiliger (uncle); Hans Magnus Enzensberger (ex-son-in-law)
- Writing career
- Language: Russian
- Years active: 1933–1992

Margarita Iosifovna Aliger (Russian: Маргари́та Ио́сифовна Алиге́р, IPA: [mərɡɐˈrʲitə ɪˈosʲɪfəvnə ɐlʲɪˈɡʲɛr]; née Zeliger; 7 October [O.S. 24 September] 1915 – August 1, 1992) was a Soviet-Russian poet, translator, and journalist.

== Early life and education ==
Margarita Iosifovna Zeliger (Russian: Маргарита Иосифовна Зейлигер) was born on 7 October [O.S. 24 September] 1915 in Odesa, Russian Empire (present-day, Ukraine) to a Russian Jewish family. Aliger's uncle was the physicist and university professor Myron Seiliger.

As a teenager Aliger worked at a chemical plant. From 1934 to 1937 she studied at the Maxim Gorky Literature Institute.

== Career ==
The main themes of her early poetry were the heroism of the Soviet people during industrialization (Year of birth, 1938; Railroad, 1939; Stones and grass, 1940) and during World War II (Lyrics, 1943). Her most famous poem is "Zoya" (1942), about Zoya Kosmodemyanskaya, a young girl killed by Nazis. This work was one of the most popular poems during the Soviet era. From 1940 to 1950, the poetry of Aliger was characterised by a mix of optimistic semi-official verses ("Leninskie mountains", 1953), and poems in which Aliger tried to analyse the situation in her country in a realistic way ("Your Victory", 1944 – 1945). In 1956, in a gathering of Khrushchev with the intelligentsia he admonished the writers for interfering with the political system. It is noted that Aliger was the only writer to speak up against him at the event. It was after the retirement that he apologized to her for his behavior. Aliger wrote numerous essays and articles about Russian literature and her impressions on travelling ("On poetry and poets", 1980; "The return from Chile", 1966).

== Personal life ==
Aliger's first husband was the composer Konstantin Makarov-Rakitin, who was killed at the front near Yartsevo in 1941 after the death of their infant son (their daughter Tatyana [1940–1974] became a poet and translator), a double tragedy that left her devastated. The following year she had an affair with the author Alexander Fadeyev; from this union was born a daughter Maria (Masha Enzenberger), who married Hans Magnus Enzensberger and lived abroad for twenty years, killing herself shortly after a brief return to Russia in 1991. Aliger's second and final husband was the Central Committee official Igor Chernoutsan (1918–1990). She survived all her husbands and children, dying shortly after her daughter Maria Enzensberger. Margarita Aliger is buried in Peredelkino next to her daughters.

== Selected works ==
- God rozhdeniia (Year of Birth) (1938)
- Zoya (1942)
- Your victory (1945)
- Great Expectations
- Two (1956)
- Leninskie gory (Lenin Hills)
- Sinii chas (Blue Hour) (1970)
