= A Captive Lion =

1987 book by Elaine Feinstein

A Captive Lion is a 1987 biography of Marina Tsvetayeva by Elaine Feinstein. It includes selected poems, Simon Karlinsky's two volume study of the author and Janet Marin King's translations of her prose.
