= Alexander Fadeev Monument =

Monument to Alexander Fadeev
- Памятник Александру Фадееву
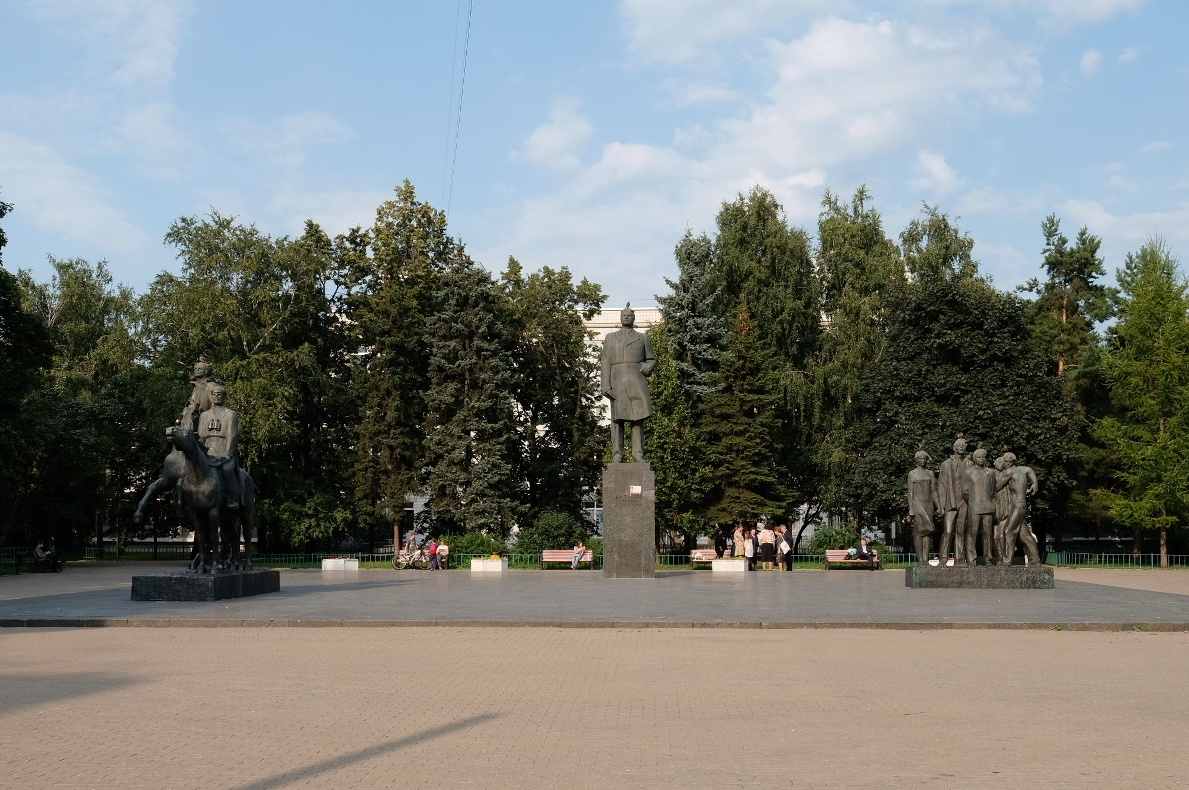
- Interactive map of Monument to Alexander Fadeev
- Location: Moscow, Miusskaya square
- Coordinates: 55°46′35″N 37°35′31″E
- Material: Bronze, granite
- Completion date: 1973
- Opening date: 1973

The Alexander Fadeev Monument (Russian: Памятник Александру Фадееву) is a sculptural ensemble dedicated to the Soviet writer Alexander Aleksandrovich Fadeyev (1901–1956) and the heroes of his works "Defeat" and "Young Guards". Established in Moscow on the Miusskaya square in front of the Palace of Pioneers and Schoolchildren. The authors of the monument are sculptor V. A. Fedorov, architects M. E. Konstantinov, V. N. Fursov. The monument has the status of an identified cultural heritage site.

== Description ==
The grand opening of the monument took place on January 25, 1973. The ceremony began with the speech of the chairman of the executive committee of the Moscow City Council V. F. Promyslov. Following that, the first secretary of the board of the Writers' Union of the USSR, G. M. Markov, spoke about the work of A. A. Fadeyev. The ceremony was also attended by candidates for membership in the Politburo of the CPSU Central Committee, P. N. Demichev and M. S. Solomentsev.

The sculptural ensemble is on the podium-site of granite blocks. In the center there is a bronze sculpture by A. A. Fadeyev on a pedestal made of gray granite. The writer is depicted full-length, in his right hand he holds a book. The sculptor gave a characteristic Fadeev's pose and manner to keep his head. To the left of the central sculpture are the heroes of the novel The Defeat. The bronze equestrian figures of Levinson and Metelitsa stood on the stirrups, as if preparing to rush into battle. On the right are five Komsomol members, members of the underground organization Young Guard.
