= Mixed/dual cycle =

Thermodynamic cycle for combustion engines

The dual combustion cycle (also known as the mixed cycle, Trinkler cycle, Seiliger cycle or Sabathe cycle) is a thermal cycle that is a combination of the Otto cycle and the Diesel cycle, first introduced by Russian-German engineer Gustav Trinkler, who never claimed to have developed the cycle himself. Heat is added partly at constant volume (isochoric) and partly at constant pressure (isobaric), the significance of which is that more time is available for the fuel to completely combust. Because of lagging characteristics of fuel this cycle is invariably used for Diesel and hot spot ignition engines. It consists of two adiabatic and two constant volume and one constant pressure processes.

Pressure-Volume diagram of Sabathe cycle

Temperature-Entropy diagram of Sabathe cycle

The dual cycle consists of following operations:

- Process 1-2: Isentropic compression
- Process 2-3: Addition of heat at constant volume.
- Process 3-4: Addition of heat at constant pressure.
- Process 4-5: Isentropic expansion.
- Process 5-1: Rejection of heat at constant volume.

== Bibliography ==
- Cornel Stan: Alternative Propulsion for Automobiles, Springer, 2016, ISBN 9783319319308, p. 48
