= Renate Rössing =

German photographer (1929–2005)

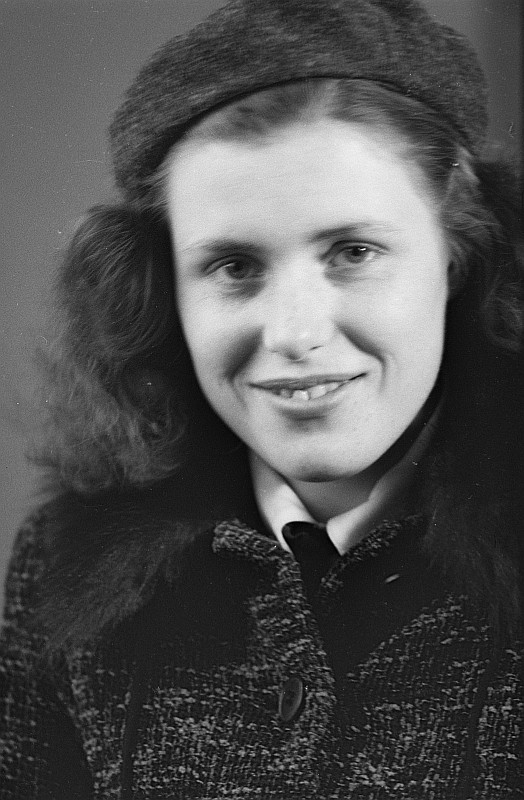
- Renate Rössing-Winkler self-portrait, 1948
- Born: Renate Winkler; 15 April 1929; Dresden, Free State of Saxony, Germany
- Died: 12 July 2005; Leipzig, Free State of Saxony, Germany
- Education: Hochschule für Grafik und Buchkunst, Leipzig
- Occupations: Photographer... Landscapes and architecture... Photojournalism... Portraiture... Daily life
- Spouse: Roger Rössing (1929-2006)
- Parent(s): Willy Winkler (1900-1934); Margarete Winkler Schieschke (1903-1945)

Renate Rössing (born Renate Winkler: 15 April 1929 – 11 July 2005) was a German photographer. Her career continued beyond the changes of 1989/90. Prior to that, as an East German citizen, she enjoyed privileges which enabled her to travel abroad. She is nevertheless best known for pictures taken in and around her home cities of Leipzig and Dresden during the 1950s and 1960s. Her work embraced photojournalism, portraiture and landscapes. For historians, some of her most interesting pictures deal with daily life during the years of postwar reconstruction in the German Democratic Republic (East Germany).

In the late 1940s Renate Winkler teamed up with fellow photography student Roger Rössing (de). After this they worked closely together: authorship of their pictures was attributed to "Rössing-Winkler" or, following their marriage in 1951, simply to "Rössing". In most cases it therefore becomes impossible to know which of them was holding the camera for any individual picture. Rolf Richter, a journalist who was also a close friend of the couple, recalls that Renate was often the more adventurous of the two when it came to selecting locations. She would crawl to the edge of flat roofs on tall buildings in order to capture a more striking panorama. It was also generally Renate who took responsibility for image composition and for the placement of image and text.

== Biography ==
Renate Winkler was born and grew up in Dresden. Willy Rössing, her father, died young in 1934, the year of her fifth birthday. On the night of 13 February 1945 the family home was completely destroyed by British and American bombing. Renate survived, buried for several days under the rubble: Margarete Winkler, her mother, died. For the rest of her life Renate's body carried the phosphorus scars from the skin burns she received that night. Following her rescue she got hold of an old basic camera from somewhere and set about photographing the bombscape that had been Dresden. Although her work was not overtly political, it was never any secret that throughout her adult life Renate Rössing-Winkler was a committed pacifist.

She applied to study at the Film Academy in Potsdam in order to study for a career as a documentary filmmaker but was informed that the class was already full. She had more success with the Academy for Book and Graphic Artistry ("Hochschule für Grafik und Buchkunst") in Leipzig, however. She enrolled to study photography in 1948. Student contemporaries included the man who later became the academy's long-standing director, Bernhard Heisig, the sculptor and graphic-artist Wolfgang Mattheuer, the painter Werner Tübke and Günter Rössler, who would later gain fame (or notoriety) for his pioneering work in nude photography. The focus of her course was on advertising and reportage. Her photography tutor was Johannes Widmann, who found her hugely talented, but very shy and withdrawn. He asked another of his students, Roger Rössing, to look after her. Shortly afterwards they set up home together in a couple of rented rooms at Leipzig-Stötteritz (de) on the southern edge of the city. They lived at the same address till Renate Rössing's death in 2005, although during that time some rooms were added. They had married in 1951.

After two or three years she lost her student funding because, it was said, she had failed to fulfill her social obligations (...wegen "Nichterfüllung der gesellschaftlichen Pflichten"): in 1951 she was obliged to quit her course. Roger Rössing showed solidarity by leaving the academy at the same time. As students and directly after abandoning their courses the Rössings supported themselves primarily through photo-journalism in and around Leipzig. As matters turned out, their shared artistry ensured that they would be able to pursue a long and successful freelance career in photography despite the evident setback of their shortened student careers.

The Rössings' active career ran for approximately 55 years, most prolifically in Leipzig itself, and in Dresden, but also of cities, landscapes and people in Romania, Bulgaria and Hungary. In addition, there was at least one working visit each to North Africa and Central Asia. Although they started out as photo-journalists, supplying newspapers and magazines, over time there was an increasing emphasis of publishing books containing photographs of people, scenes and places. There are suggestions that in the end approximately 90 volumes were published: the Rössing Foundation website makes mention of "over 100 books and written works in which it is pointless to [try and] separate out the contributions of Renate and Roger". (Note: "Es ist müßig, in den über 100 Büchern und Schriften die Leistungen beider zu trennen.")

== Published output (selection) ==
- Roger und Renate Rössing: Menschen in der Stadt. Fotografien 1946–1989. Lehmstedt, Leipzig 2006, ISBN 3-937146-32-6.
- Roger und Renate Rössing: Rössings Sammelsurium. Texte zur Erinnerung an Renate Rössing (1929–2005). Connewitzer Verlagsbuchhandlung, Leipzig 2005, ISBN 3-937799-19-2.
- Roger und Renate Rössing: Leipzig in den Fünfzigern. Kiepenheuer, Leipzig 2003, ISBN 3-378-01063-0.
- Roger und Renate Rössing: Parkansichten. Bilder aus historischen Parkanlagen zwischen Eisenach und Cottbus. Brockhaus, Leipzig 1991, ISBN 3-325-00269-2.
- Roger und Renate Rössing: Leipzig in Farbe. Brockhaus, Leipzig 1984, ISBN 3-7972-0109-5.

== Weblinks ==
- Roger and Renate Rössing at Deutsche Fotothek, Archive of Photographers.
