= Chuguyevka (rural locality) =

Rural locality in Primorsky Krai, Russia

Chuguyevka Чугуевка
- selo
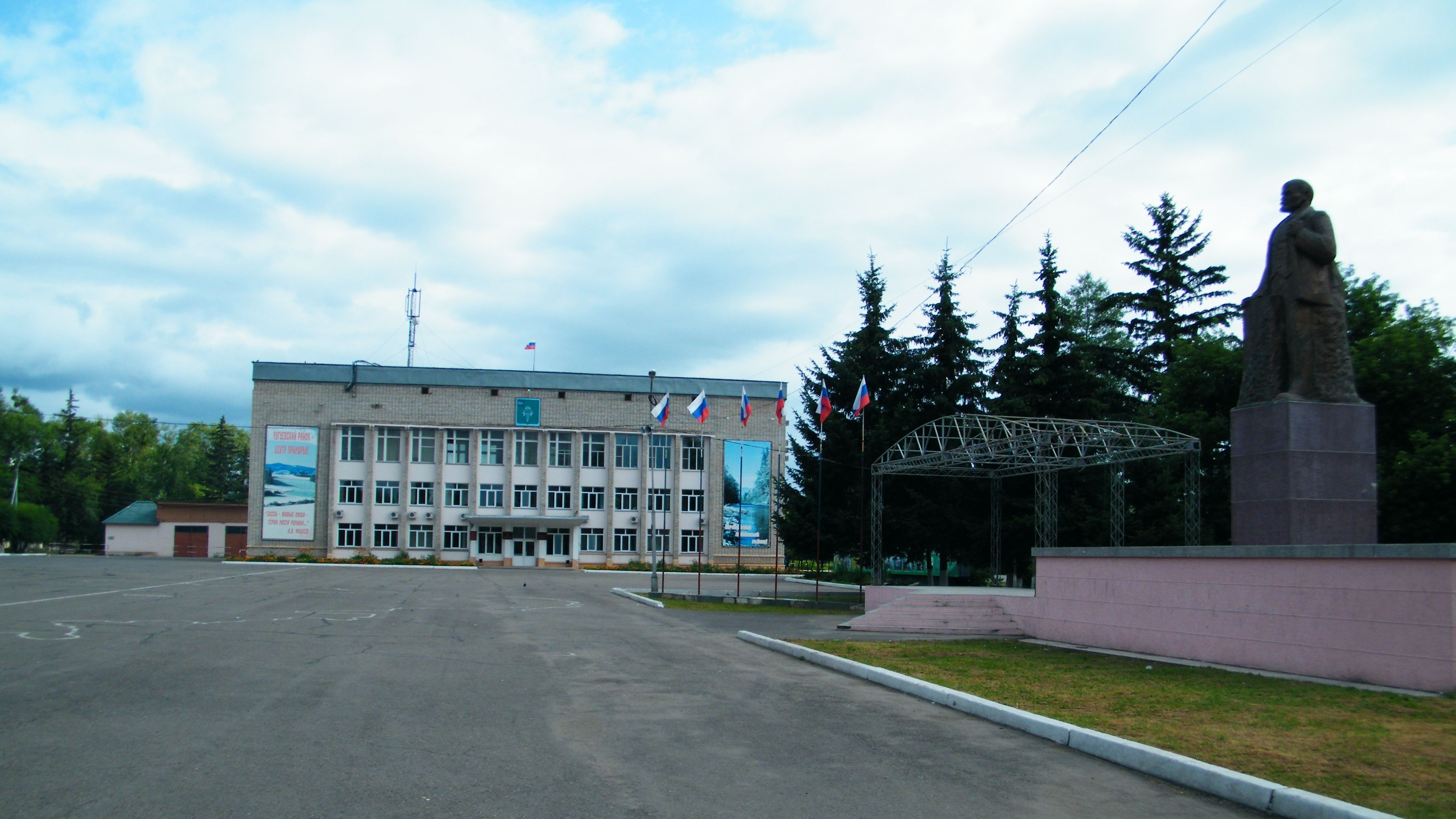
- Chuguyevka, July 2011
- Interactive map of Chuguyevka
- Location of Chuguyevka Chuguyevka (Primorsky Krai)
- Coordinates: 44°10′00″N 133°51′30″E
- Country: Russia
- Federal subject: Primorsky Krai
- Founded: 1903

Population (2010 Census)
  - Total: 12,171
  - Estimate (2021): 11,101 (−8.8%)
- Time zone: UTC+10 (MSK+7)
- Postal code: 692623
- OKTMO ID: 05655437101

Chuguyevka (Russian: Чугуевка) is a rural locality (a selo) and the administrative center of Chuguyevsky District, Primorsky Krai, Russia. The Chuguyevka air base is located to its south.

Population: 12,171 (2010 census); 13,680 (2002 census); 12,427 (1989 Soviet census).

There is a General regime colony – institution UC-267/31 GUIN of the Russian Ministry of Justice for the Primorsky Territory (Novochuguevka village, 44.207012°N 133.841016°E)

== Famous people ==
- The writer Alexander Fadeev spent his childhood and teenage years in Chuguevka. On the street 50 Let Oktyabrya there is a literary and memorial museum of A. Fadeev.
- At the air base of the 11th Separate Air Defense Army of the USSR in Chuguevka, a pilot instructor, Art. Lieutenant Viktor Belenko, who took off on his MiG-25 6 September 1976 from Sokolovka airfield and flew to Japan.
- Hero of the Soviet Union Alexey Lapik lived and worked in the village; a street is named in his honor.
- Mikhail Badyuk was born and raised in the village – an air gunner-radio operator, a participant of WWII, Hero of the Soviet Union.
