= Chuguyevsky District =

Chuguyevsky District Чугуевский район (Russian)
- District
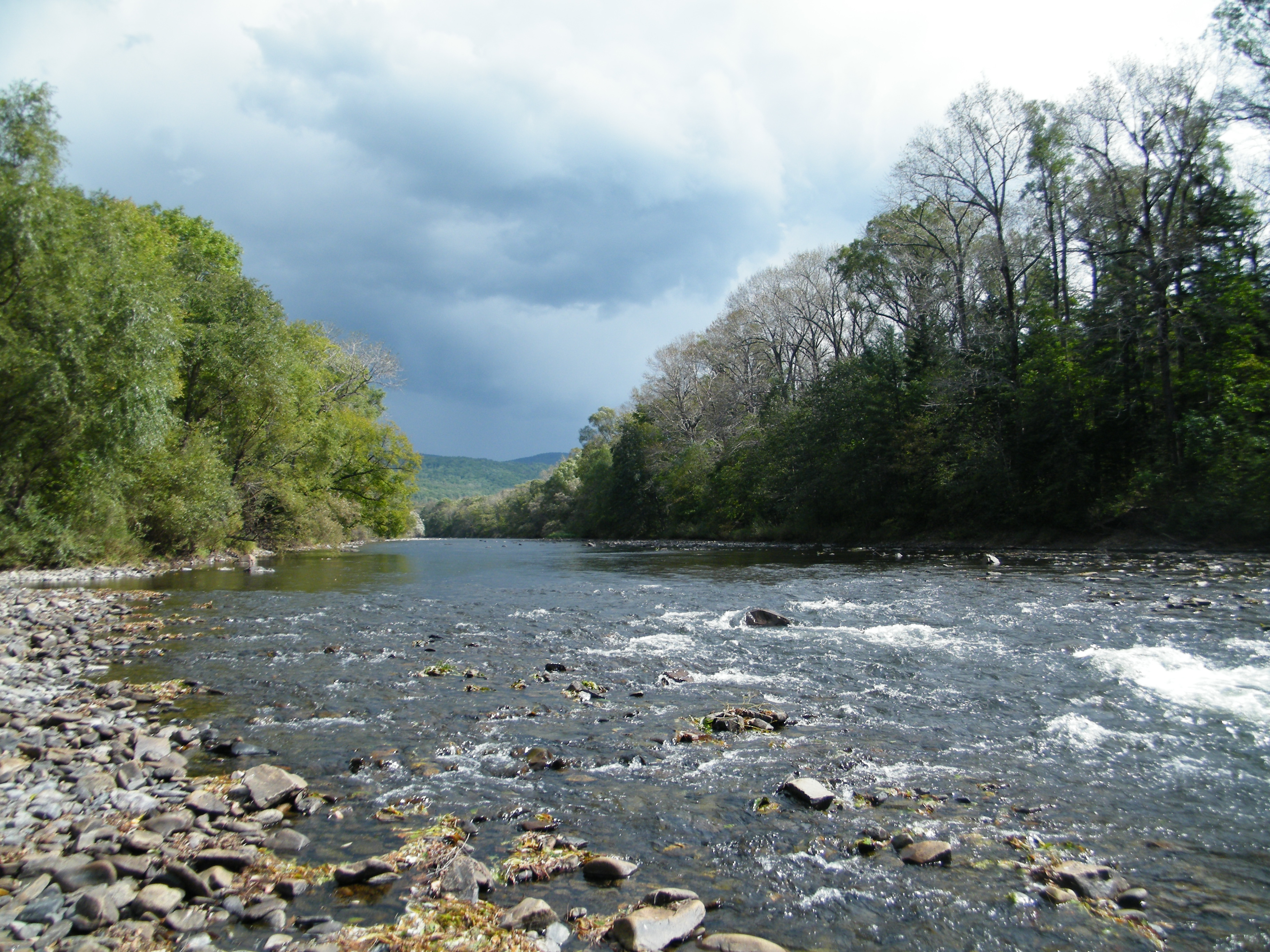
- The Pavlovka River in Chuguyevsky District

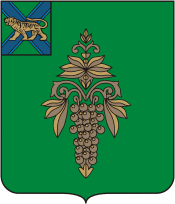
- Coat of arms
- Location of Chuguyevsky District in Primorsky Krai
- Coordinates: 44°28′N 134°12′E
- Country: Russia
- Federal subject: Primorsky Krai
- Established: 23 March 1935
- Administrative center: Chuguyevka

Area
  - Total: 12,346.5 km^{2} (4,767.0 sq mi)

Population (2010 Census)
  - Total: 24,937
  - Density: 2.0198/km^{2} (5.2312/sq mi)
  - Urban: 0%
  - Rural: 100%

Administrative structure
  - Inhabited localities: 32 rural localities

Municipal structure
  - Municipally incorporated as: Chuguyevsky Municipal District
  - Municipal divisions: 0 urban settlements, 3 rural settlements
- Time zone: UTC+10 (MSK+7)
- OKTMO ID: 05555000
- Website: Chuguevsky

Chuguyevsky District (Russian: Чугу́евский райо́н) is an administrative and municipal district (raion), one of the twenty-two in Primorsky Krai, Russia. It is located in the center of the krai. The area of the district is 12,346 square kilometers (4,767 sq mi). Its administrative center is the rural locality (a selo) of Chuguyevka. Population: 24,937 (2010 census); 28,913 (2002 census); 30,909 (1989 Soviet census). The population of Chuguyevka accounts for 48.8% of the district's total population.

== Geography ==
The territory is rugged by the ranges and spurs of Sikhote-Alin mountain system and almost totally covered with forests and bushes mainly of coniferous-deciduous kind. There is a game reserve in the territory of the district which is remarkable for its highland landscape with specific fauna and endemic insect species. In 2007, Zov Tigra national park based on this game preserve was established in the district.

== Economy ==
The district's industry is represented by the krai's largest timber industry enterprises which are involved in commercial timber processing, saw timber, and technological wood chips and plywood production. Development and utilization of perlites, zeolites, and vermiculites as well as forest food resources are considered prospective.

There is a large deposit of perlite and vermiculite which can be used as a filler in a concrete-processing industry. A zeolite deposit is exploited in the district. There are stocks of the gravel-sand mixture and pebble, and a unique deposit of decorative collectible stones.

Agriculture is specialized in potato growing, milk and meat cattle breeding. The arable area comprises some western part of the district, with its rich alluvial soils of the upper to middle valleys of the Ussuri River.
