= Myron Seiliger =

Мирон Павлович Зейлигер Russian pronunciation: [miron pavlovitɕ zʲəɪlʲiɡɛrʲ] (1874–1952), (English transcription: Miron Pavlovich Zeyliger), birthname: Меер Пинхусович Зейлигер (English transcription: Meer Pinkhusovich Zeyliger), known as: Myron Seiliger, was a Russian physicist and university professor who developed the Seiliger cycle, a hypothetical model that describes how the Diesel engine works.

== Life and career ==
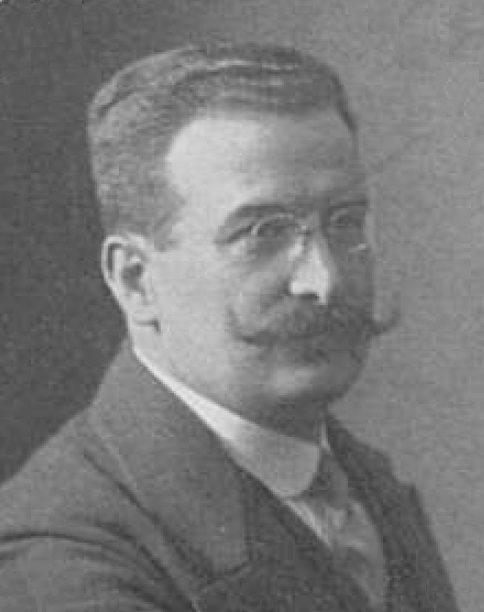
Meer Pinkhusovich Zeyliger

Seiliger, who was born in Odessa, studied at the Institute of Technology in Saint Petersburg. Later, he became a professor there and lectured in thermodynamics and internal combustion engines. In 1910, Seiliger developed the dual cycle, which was later named Seiliger cycle after him. After the Russian Revolution, Seiliger left Russia; in October 1924, he moved to France, where he became a professor of the RWTI Paris and continued lecturing. Also, Seiliger was a member of the Society of Russian Engineers.

== Published works ==
- Graphische Thermodynamik und Berechnen der Verbrennungs-Maschinen und Turbinen, Springer, Berlin/Heidelberg, 1922, ISBN 978-3-662-42983-9
- Die Hochleistungs-Dieselmotoren, Springer, Berlin/Heidelberg, 1926, ISBN 978-2-8101-1186-2
- Kompressorlose Dieselmotoren und Semidieselmotoren, Springer, Berlin/Heidelberg, 1929, ISBN 978-3-662-25489-9
