= Western imperialism in Asia =

The influence and imperialism of the West peaked in Asian territories from the colonial period beginning in the 16th century, and substantially reduced with 20th century decolonization. It originated in the 15th-century search for trade routes to the Indian subcontinent and Southeast Asia, in response to Ottoman control of the Silk Road. This led to the Age of Discovery, and introduction of early modern warfare into what Europeans first called the East Indies, and later the Far East. By the 16th century, the Age of Sail expanded European influence and development of the spice trade under colonialism. European-style colonial empires and imperialism operated in Asia throughout six centuries of colonialism, formally ending with the independence of Portuguese Macau in 1999. The empires introduced Western concepts of nation and the multinational state.

European political power, commerce, and culture in Asia gave rise to growing trade in commodities—a key development in the rise of the free market economy. In the 16th century, the Portuguese broke the monopoly of the Arabs and Italians in trade between Asia and Europe by its discovery of the sea route to India around the Cape of Good Hope. The ensuing rise of the rival Dutch East India Company gradually eclipsed Portuguese influence in Asia. (Note: For fifty or sixty years, the Portuguese enjoyed the exclusive trade to China and Japan. In 1717, and again in 1732, the Chinese government offered to make Macao the emporium for all its foreign trade, and to receive all duties on imports; but, by a strange infatuation, the Portuguese government refused, and the decline in Portuguese influence dates from that period.) Dutch forces first established independent bases in the East and between 1640-60 wrested Malacca, Ceylon, some southern Indian ports, and the lucrative Japan trade from the Portuguese. The English and French established settlements in India and trade with China and their acquisitions surpassed the Dutch. After the Seven Years' War in 1763, the British eliminated French influence in India and established the East India Company as the most important political force on the Indian subcontinent.

Before the 19th century Industrial Revolution, demand for oriental goods such as porcelain, silk, spices, and tea remained the driving force behind European imperialism. The European stake in Asia was confined largely to trading stations and outposts necessary to protect trade. Industrialization, however, dramatically increased European demand for Asian raw materials. The 1870s Long Depression provoked a scramble for new markets for Western European products and services in Africa, the Americas, Eastern Europe, and especially Asia. This coincided with an era known as "the New Imperialism", which saw a shift in focus from trade and indirect rule to colonial control of large overseas territories as political extensions of their mother countries. Between the 1870s and World War I in 1914, the UK, Netherlands and France—the established colonial powers in Asia—added to their empires in West Asia, Indian Subcontinent, and Southeast Asia. The Empire of Japan following the Meiji Restoration; the German Empire after the Franco-Prussian War in 1871; Tsarist Russia; and the US following the Spanish–American War in 1898, emerged as new imperial powers in East Asia and the Pacific Ocean area.

In Asia, the World Wars were played out as struggles among imperial powers, with conflicts involving the European powers along with Russia and the rising American and Japanese. None of the colonial powers however, possessed the resources to withstand the strains of both wars and maintain their direct rule in Asia. Although nationalist movements throughout the colonial world led to the political independence of nearly all of Asia's remaining colonies, decolonization was intercepted by the Cold War. West Asia, South Asia, Southeast Asia, and East Asia remained embedded in a world economic, financial, and military system in which the great powers competed to extend their influence. However, the rapid post-war economic development and rise of the industrialized developed countries of Republic of China on Taiwan, Singapore, South Korea, Japan and the developing countries of India, China, along with the collapse of the Soviet Union, have greatly diminished European influence in Asia. The US remains influential with trade and military bases in Asia.

== Early European exploration of Asia ==
European exploration of Asia started in ancient Roman times along the Silk Road. The Romans had knowledge of lands as distant as China. Trade with India through the Roman Egyptian Red Sea ports was significant in the first centuries of the Common Era.

=== Medieval European exploration of Asia ===
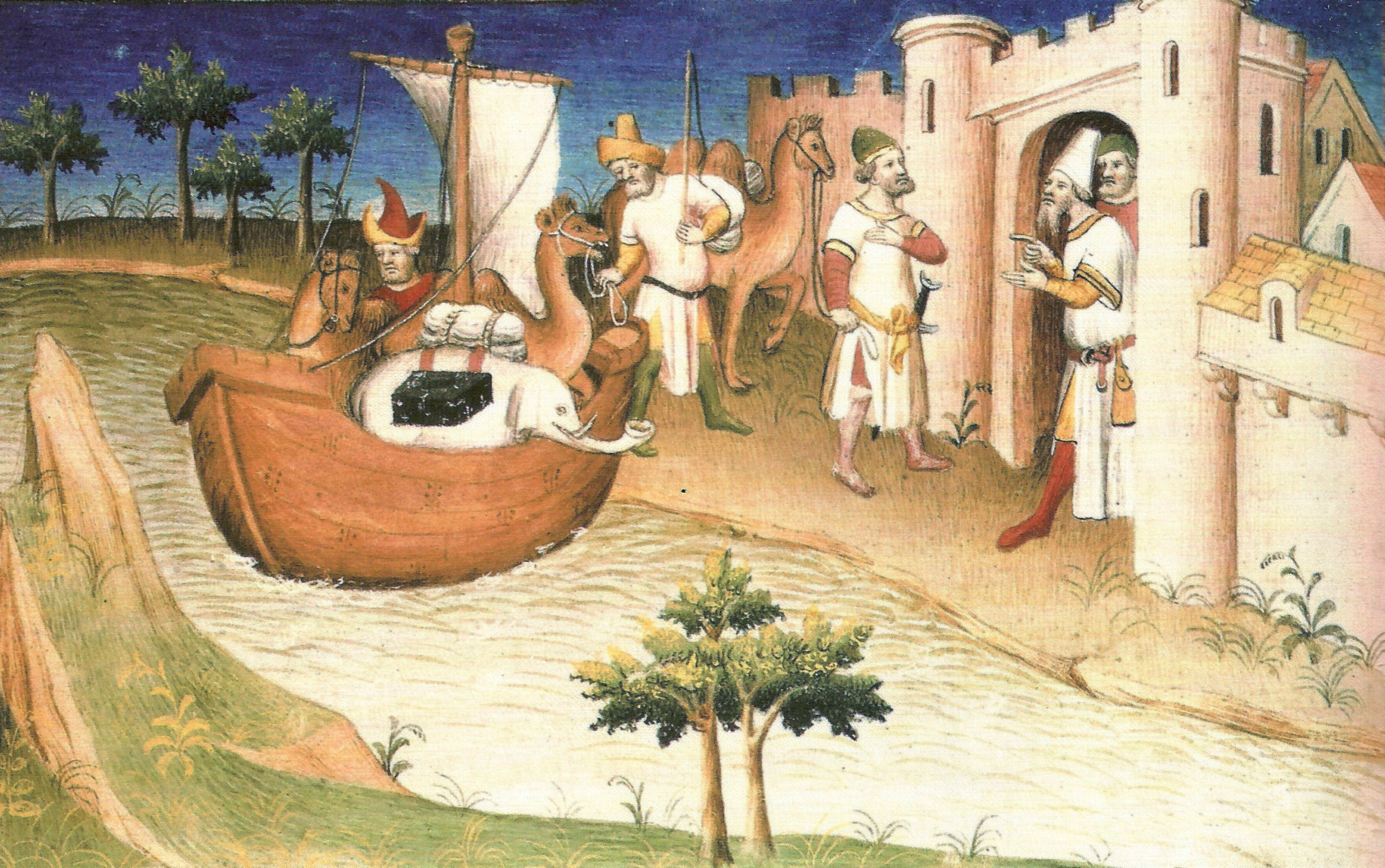
Illustration of Marco Polo's arrival in a Chinese city

In the 13th and 14th centuries, a number of Europeans, many of them Christian missionaries, had sought to penetrate into China. The most famous of these travelers was Marco Polo. But these journeys had little permanent effect on east–west trade because of a series of political developments in Asia in the last decades of the 14th century, which put an end to further European exploration of Asia. The Yuan dynasty in China, which had been receptive to European missionaries and merchants, was overthrown, and the new Ming rulers were found to be unreceptive of religious proselytism. Meanwhile, the Ottoman Turks consolidated control over the Eastern Mediterranean, closing off key overland trade routes. Thus, until the 15th century, only minor trade and cultural exchanges between Europe and Asia continued at certain terminals controlled by Muslim traders.

=== Oceanic voyages to Asia ===
Western European rulers determined to find new trade routes of their own. The Portuguese spearheaded the drive to find oceanic routes that would provide cheaper and easier access to South and East Asian goods. This chartering of oceanic routes between East and West began with the unprecedented voyages of Portuguese and Spanish sea captains. Their voyages were influenced by medieval European adventurers, who had journeyed overland to the Far East and contributed to geographical knowledge of parts of Asia upon their return.

In 1488, Bartolomeu Dias rounded the southern tip of Africa under the sponsorship of Portugal's John II, from which point he noticed that the coast swung northeast (Cape of Good Hope). While Dias' crew forced him to turn back, by 1497, Portuguese navigator Vasco da Gama made the first open voyage from Europe to India. In 1520, Ferdinand Magellan, a Portuguese navigator in the service of the Crown of Castile ('Spain'), found a sea route into the Pacific Ocean.

== Portuguese and Spanish trade and colonization in Asia ==
=== Portuguese monopoly over trade in the Indian Ocean and Asia ===
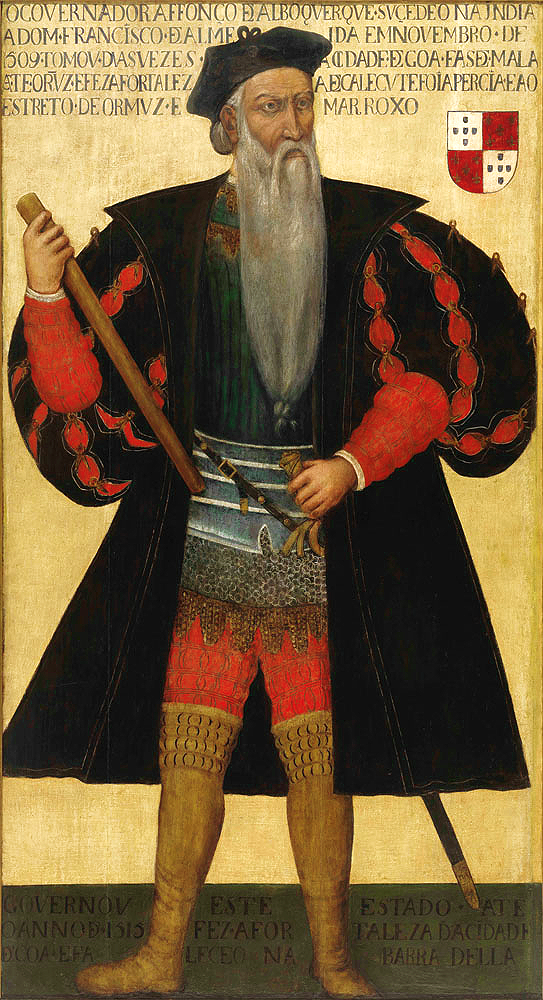
Afonso de Albuquerque

In 1509, the Portuguese under Francisco de Almeida won the decisive battle of Diu against a joint Mamluk and Arab fleet sent to expel the Portuguese of the Arabian Sea. The victory enabled Portugal to implement its strategy of controlling the Indian Ocean.

Early in the 16th century, Afonso de Albuquerque emerged as the Portuguese colonial viceroy most instrumental in consolidating Portugal's holdings in Africa and in Asia. He understood that Portugal could wrest commercial supremacy from the Arabs only by force, and therefore devised a plan to establish forts at strategic sites which would dominate the trade routes and also protect Portuguese interests on land. In 1510, he conquered Goa in India, which enabled him to gradually consolidate control of most of the commercial traffic between Europe and Asia, largely through trade; Europeans started to carry on trade from forts, acting as foreign merchants rather than as settlers. In contrast, early European expansion in the "West Indies", (later known to Europeans as a separate continent from Asia that they would call the "Americas") following the 1492 voyage of Christopher Columbus, involved heavy settlement in colonies that were treated as political extensions of the mother countries.

Lured by the potential of high profits from another expedition, the Portuguese established a permanent base in Cochin, south of the Indian trade port of Calicut in the early 16th century. In 1510, the Portuguese, led by Afonso de Albuquerque, seized Goa on the coast of India, which Portugal held until 1961, along with Diu and Daman (the remaining territory and enclaves in India from a former network of coastal towns and smaller fortified trading ports added and abandoned or lost centuries before). The Portuguese soon acquired a monopoly over trade in the Indian Ocean.

Portuguese viceroy Albuquerque (1509–1515) resolved to consolidate Portuguese holdings in Africa and Asia, and secure control of trade with the East Indies and China. His first objective was Malacca, which controlled the narrow strait through which most Far Eastern trade moved. Captured in 1511, Malacca became the springboard for further eastward penetration, starting with the voyage of António de Abreu and Francisco Serrão in 1512, ordered by Albuquerque, to the Moluccas. Years later the first trading posts were established in the Moluccas, or "Spice Islands", which was the source for some of the world's most hotly demanded spices, and from there, in Makassar and some others, but smaller, in the Lesser Sunda Islands. By 1513–1516, the first Portuguese ships had reached Canton on the southern coasts of China.

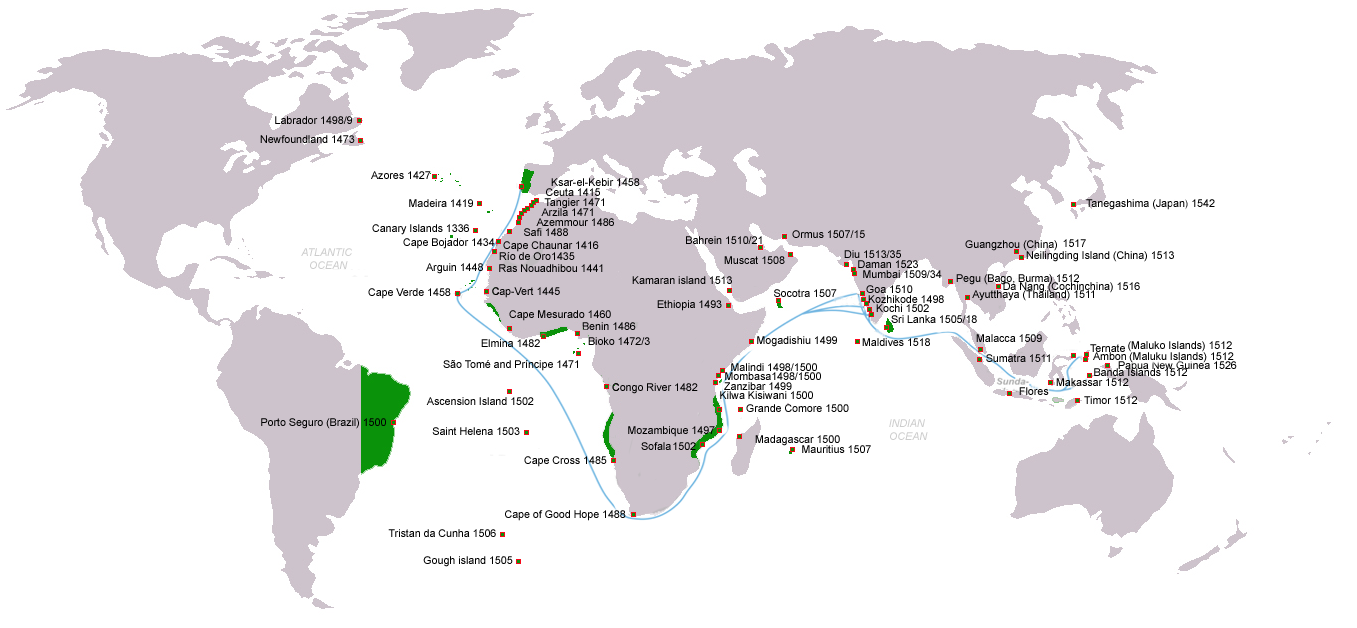
Portuguese expeditions 1415–1542: arrival places and dates; Portuguese spice trade routes in the Indian Ocean (blue); territories of the Portuguese empire under King John III rule (green)

In 1513, after the failed attempt to conquer Aden, Albuquerque entered with an armada, for the first time for Europeans by the ocean via, on the Red Sea; and in 1515, Albuquerque consolidated the Portuguese hegemony in the Persian Gulf gates, already begun by him in 1507, with the domain of Muscat and Ormuz. Shortly after, other fortified bases and forts were annexed and built along the Gulf, and in 1521, through a military campaign, the Portuguese annexed Bahrain.

The Portuguese conquest of Malacca triggered the Malayan–Portuguese war. In 1521, Ming dynasty China defeated the Portuguese at the Battle of Tunmen and then defeated the Portuguese again at the Battle of Xicaowan. The Portuguese tried to establish trade with China by illegally smuggling with the pirates on the offshore islands off the coast of Zhejiang and Fujian, but they were driven away by the Ming navy in the 1530s-1540s.

In 1557, China decided to lease Macau to the Portuguese as a place where they could dry goods they transported on their ships, which they held until 1999. The Portuguese, based at Goa and Malacca, had now established a lucrative maritime empire in the Indian Ocean meant to monopolize the spice trade. The Portuguese also began a channel of trade with the Japanese, becoming the first recorded Westerners to have visited Japan. This contact introduced Christianity and firearms into Japan.

In 1505, (also possibly before, in 1501), the Portuguese, through Lourenço de Almeida, the son of Francisco de Almeida, reached Ceylon. The Portuguese founded a fort at the city of Colombo in 1517 and gradually extended their control over the coastal areas and inland. In a series of military conflicts and political maneuvers, the Portuguese extended their control over the Sinhalese kingdoms, including Jaffna (1591), Raigama (1593), Sitawaka (1593), and Kotte (1594)- However, the aim of unifying the entire island under Portuguese control faced the Kingdom of Kandy`s fierce resistance. The Portuguese, led by Pedro Lopes de Sousa, launched a full-scale military invasion of the kingdom of Kandy in the Campaign of Danture of 1594. The invasion was a disaster for the Portuguese, with their entire army wiped out by Kandyan guerrilla warfare. Constantino de Sá, romantically celebrated in the 17th century Sinhalese Epic (also for its greater humanism and tolerance compared to other governors) led the last military operation that also ended in disaster. He died in the Battle of Randeniwela, refusing to abandon his troops in the face of total annihilation.

The energies of Castile (later, the unified Spain), the other major colonial power of the 16th century, were largely concentrated on the Americas, not South and East Asia, but the Spanish did establish a footing in the Far East in the Philippines. After fighting with the Portuguese by the Spice Islands since 1522 and the agreement between the two powers in 1529 (in the treaty of Zaragoza), the Spanish, led by Miguel López de Legazpi, settled and conquered gradually the Philippines since 1564. After the discovery of the return voyage to the Americas by Andres de Urdaneta in 1565, cargoes of Chinese goods were transported from the Philippines to Mexico and from there to Spain. By this long route, Spain reaped some of the profits of Far Eastern commerce. Spanish officials converted the islands to Christianity and established some settlements, permanently establishing the Philippines as the area of East Asia most oriented toward the West in terms of culture and commerce. The Moro Muslims fought against the Spanish for over three centuries in the Spanish–Moro conflict.

=== Decline of Portugal's Asian empire since the 17th century ===
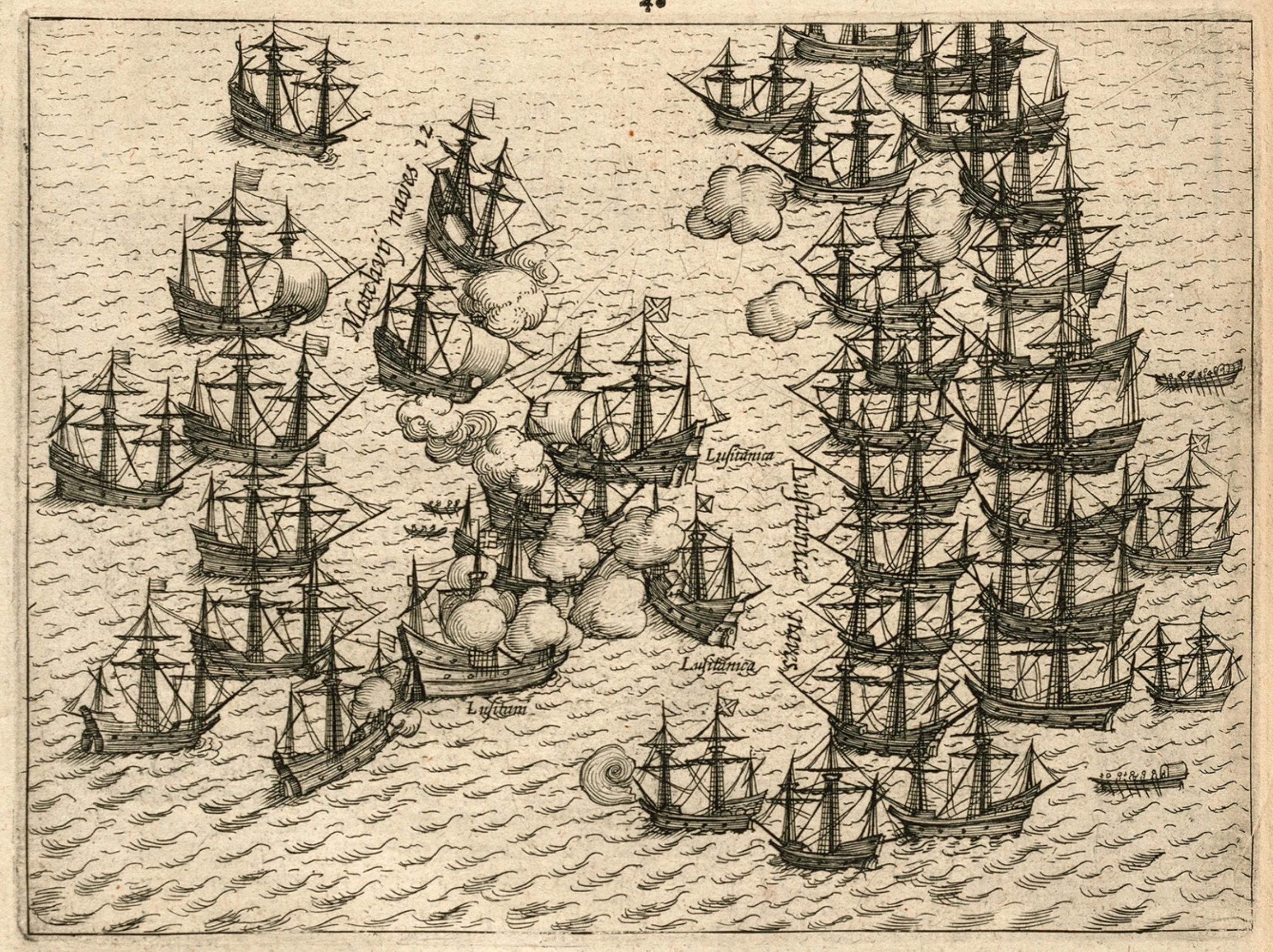
Dutch and Portuguese ships battling over the control of Malacca during the Dutch–Portuguese War, 1606

The lucrative trade was vastly expanded when the Portuguese began to export slaves from Africa in 1541; however, over time, the rise of the slave trade left Portugal over-extended, and vulnerable to competition from other Western European powers. Envious of Portugal's control of trade routes, other Western European nations—mainly the Netherlands, France, and England—began to send in rival expeditions to Asia. In 1642, the Dutch drove the Portuguese out of the Gold Coast in Africa, the source of the bulk of Portuguese slave laborers, leaving this rich slaving area to other Europeans, especially the Dutch and the English.

Rival European powers began to make inroads in Asia as the Portuguese and Spanish trade in the Indian Ocean declined primarily because they had become hugely over-stretched financially due to the limitations on their investment capacity and contemporary naval technology. Both of these factors worked in tandem, making control over Indian Ocean trade extremely expensive.

The existing Portuguese interests in Asia proved sufficient to finance further colonial expansion and entrenchment in areas regarded as of greater strategic importance in Africa and Brazil. Portuguese maritime supremacy was lost to the Dutch in the 17th century, and with this came serious challenges for the Portuguese. However, they still clung to Macau and settled a new colony on the island of Timor. It was as recent as the 1960s and 1970s that the Portuguese began to relinquish their colonies in Asia. Goa was invaded by India in 1961 and became an Indian state in 1987; Portuguese Timor was abandoned in 1975 and was then invaded by Indonesia. It became an independent country in 2002, and Macau was handed back to the Chinese as per a treaty in 1999.

=== Holy wars ===
The arrival of the Portuguese and Spanish and their holy wars against Muslim states in the Malayan–Portuguese war, Spanish–Moro conflict and Castilian War inflamed religious tensions and turned Southeast Asia into an arena of conflict between Muslims and Christians. The Brunei Sultanate's capital at Kota Batu was assaulted by Governor Sande who led the 1578 Spanish attack.

The word "savages" in Spanish, cafres, was from the word "infidel" in Arabic - Kafir, and was used by the Spanish to refer to their own "Christian savages" who were arrested in Brunei. It was said Castilians are kafir, men who have no souls, who are condemned by fire when they die, and that too because they eat pork by the Brunei Sultan after the term accursed doctrine was used to attack Islam by the Spaniards which fed into hatred between Muslims and Christians sparked by their 1571 war against Brunei. The Sultan's words were in response to insults coming from the Spanish at Manila in 1578, other Muslims from Champa, Java, Borneo, Luzon, Pahang, Demak, Aceh, and the Malays echoed the rhetoric of holy war against the Spanish and Iberian Portuguese, calling them kafir enemies which was a contrast to their earlier nuanced views of the Portuguese in the Hikayat Tanah Hitu and Sejarah Melayu. The war by Spain against Brunei was defended in an apologia written by Doctor De Sande. The British eventually partitioned and took over Brunei while Sulu was attacked by the British, Americans, and Spanish which caused its breakdown and downfall after both of them thrived from 1500 to 1900 for four centuries. Dar al-Islam was seen as under invasion by "kafirs" by the Atjehnese led by Zayn al-din and by Muslims in the Philippines as they saw the Spanish invasion, since the Spanish brought the idea of a crusader holy war against Muslim Moros just as the Portuguese did in Indonesia and India against what they called "Moors" in their political and commercial conquests which they saw through the lens of religion in the 16th century.

In 1578, an attack was launched by the Spanish against Jolo, and in 1875 it was destroyed at their hands, and once again in 1974 it was destroyed by the Philippines. The Spanish first set foot on Borneo in Brunei.

The Spanish war against Brunei failed to conquer Brunei but it totally cut off the Philippines from Brunei's influence, the Spanish then started colonizing Mindanao and building fortresses. In response, the Bisayas, where Spanish forces were stationed, were subjected to retaliatory attacks by the Magindanao in 1599-1600 due to the Spanish attacks on Mindanao.

The Brunei royal family was related to the Muslim Rajahs who in ruled the principality in 1570 of Manila (Kingdom of Maynila) and this was what the Spaniards came across on their initial arrival to Manila, Spain uprooted Islam out of areas where it was shallow after they began to force Christianity on the Philippines in their conquests after 1521 while Islam was already widespread in the 16th century Philippines. In the Philippines in the Cebu islands the natives killed the Spanish fleet leader Magellan. Borneo's western coastal areas at Landak, Sukadana, and Sambas saw the growth of Muslim states in the sixteenth century, in the 15th century at Nanking, the capital of China, the death and burial of the Borneo Bruneian king Maharaja Kama took place upon his visit to China with Zheng He's fleet.

The Spanish were expelled from Brunei in 1579 after they attacked in 1578. There were fifty thousand inhabitants before the 1597 attack by the Spanish in Brunei.

During first contact with China, numerous aggressions and provocations were undertaken by the Portuguese They believed they could mistreat the non-Christians because they themselves were Christians and acted in the name of their religion in committing crimes and atrocities. This resulted in the Battle of Xicaowan where the local Chinese navy defeated and captured a fleet of Portuguese caravels.

== Dutch trade and colonization in Asia ==
=== Rise of Dutch control over Asian trade in the 17th century ===
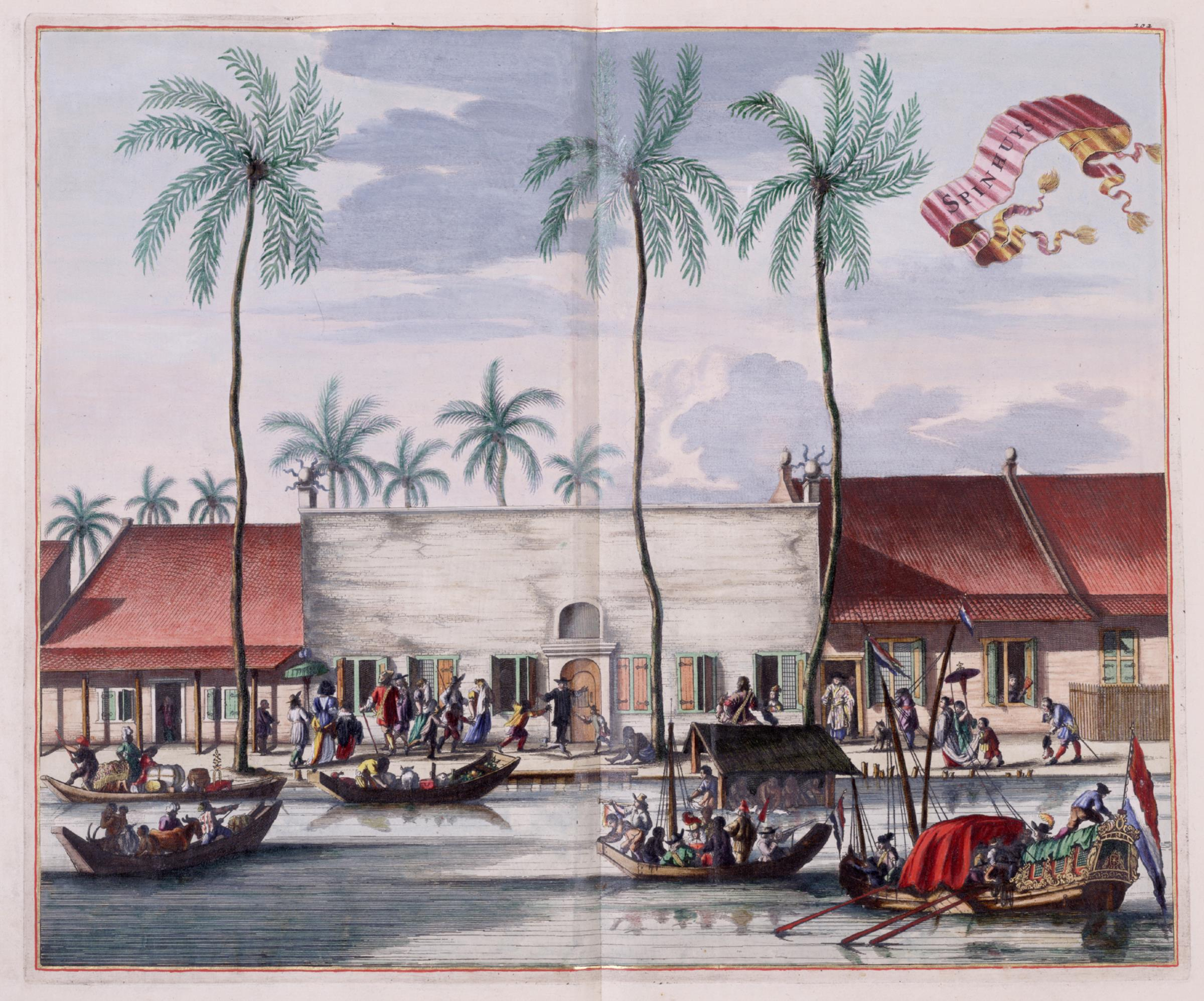
Dutch settlement in the East Indies. Batavia (now Jakarta), Java, c. 1665.

The Portuguese decline in Asia was accelerated by attacks on their commercial empire by the Dutch and the English, which began a global struggle over the empire in Asia that lasted until the end of the Seven Years' War in 1763. The Netherlands revolt against Spanish rule facilitated Dutch encroachment on the Portuguese monopoly over South and East Asian trade. The Dutch looked on Spain's trade and colonies as potential spoils of war. When the two crowns of the Iberian peninsula were joined in 1581, the Dutch felt free to attack Portuguese territories in Asia.

By the 1590s, a number of Dutch companies were formed to finance trading expeditions in Asia. Because competition lowered their profits, and because of the doctrines of mercantilism, in 1602 the companies united into a cartel and formed the Dutch East India Company, and received from the government the right to trade and colonize territory in the area stretching from the Cape of Good Hope eastward to the Strait of Magellan.

In 1605, armed Dutch merchants captured the Portuguese fort at Amboyna in the Moluccas, which was developed into the company's first secure base. Over time, the Dutch gradually consolidated control over the great trading ports of the East Indies. This control allowed the company to monopolise the world spice trade for decades. Their monopoly over the spice trade became complete after they drove the Portuguese from Malacca in 1641 and Ceylon in 1658.

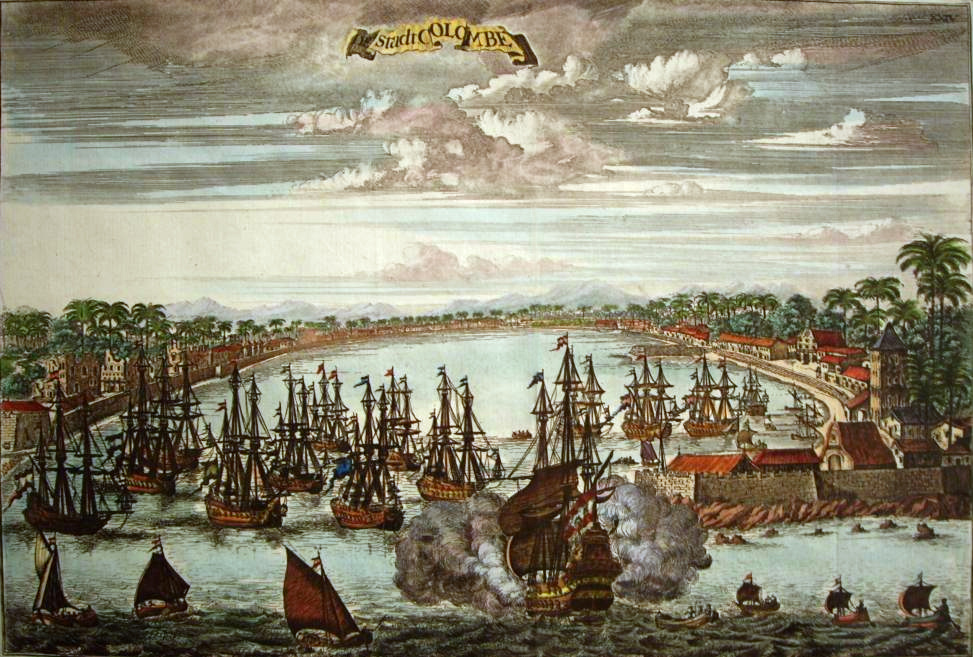
Colombo, Dutch Ceylon, based on an engraving of circa 1680

Dutch East India Company colonies or outposts were later established in Atjeh (Aceh), 1667; Macassar, 1669; and Bantam, 1682. The company established its headquarters at Batavia (today Jakarta) on the island of Java. Outside the East Indies, the Dutch East India Company colonies or outposts were also established in Persia (Iran), Bengal (now Bangladesh and part of India), Mauritius (1638-1658/1664-1710), Siam (now Thailand), Guangzhou (Canton, China), Taiwan (1624–1662), and southern India (1616–1795).

Ming dynasty China defeated the Dutch East India Company in the Sino-Dutch conflicts. The Chinese first defeated and drove the Dutch out of the Pescadores in 1624. The Ming navy under Zheng Zhilong defeated the Dutch East India Company's fleet at the 1633 Battle of Liaoluo Bay. In 1662, Zheng Zhilong's son Zheng Chenggong (also known as Koxinga) expelled the Dutch from Taiwan after defeating them in the siege of Fort Zeelandia. (see History of Taiwan) Further, the Dutch East India Company trade post on Dejima (1641–1857), an artificial island off the coast of Nagasaki, was for a long time the only place where Europeans could trade with Japan.

The Vietnamese Nguyễn lords defeated the Dutch in a naval battle in 1643.

The Cambodians defeated the Dutch in the Cambodian–Dutch War in 1644.

In 1652, Jan van Riebeeck established an outpost at the Cape of Good Hope (the southwestern tip of Africa, currently in South Africa) to restock company ships on their journey to East Asia. This post later became a fully-fledged colony, the Cape Colony (1652–1806). As Cape Colony attracted increasing Dutch and European settlement, the Dutch founded the city of Kaapstad (Cape Town).

By 1669, the Dutch East India Company was the richest private company in history, with a huge fleet of merchant ships and warships, tens of thousands of employees, a private army consisting of thousands of soldiers, and a reputation on the part of its stockholders for high dividend payments.

=== Dutch New Imperialism in Asia ===
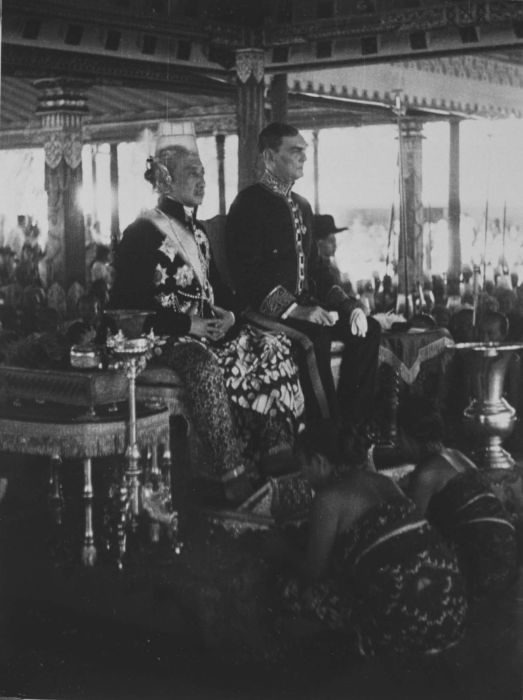
The Dutch Governor-General, highest authority in the colony and the Sultan of Jogjakarta.

The company was in almost constant conflict with the English; relations were particularly tense following the Amboyna Massacre in 1623. During the 18th century, Dutch East India Company possessions were increasingly focused on the East Indies. After the fourth war between the United Provinces and England (1780–1784), the company suffered increasing financial difficulties. In 1799, the company was dissolved, commencing official colonisation of the East Indies. During the era of New Imperialism the territorial claims of the Dutch East India Company (VOC) expanded into a fully fledged colony named the Dutch East Indies. Partly driven by re-newed colonial aspirations of fellow European nation states the Dutch strived to establish unchallenged control of the archipelago now known as Indonesia.

Six years into formal colonisation of the East Indies, in Europe the Dutch Republic was occupied by the French forces of Napoleon. The Dutch government went into exile in England and formally ceded its colonial possessions to Great Britain. The pro-French Governor General of Java Jan Willem Janssens, resisted a British invasion force in 1811 until forced to surrender. British Governor Raffles, who the later founded the city of Singapore, ruled the colony the following 10 years of the British interregnum (1806–1816).

After the defeat of Napoleon and the Anglo-Dutch Treaty of 1814 colonial government of the East Indies was ceded back to the Dutch in 1817. The loss of South Africa and the continued scramble for Africa stimulated the Dutch to secure unchallenged dominion over its colony in the East Indies. The Dutch started to consolidate its power base through extensive military campaigns and elaborate diplomatic alliances with indigenous rulers ensuring the Dutch tricolor was firmly planted in all corners of the Archipelago. These military campaigns included: the Padri War (1821–1837), the Java War (1825–1830) and the Aceh War (1873–1904). This raised the need for a considerable military buildup of the colonial army (KNIL). From all over Europe soldiers were recruited to join the KNIL. (Note: In 1819 the standing army consisted of over 7,000 European and 5,000 indigenous troops.)

The Dutch concentrated their colonial enterprise in the Dutch East Indies (Indonesia) throughout the 19th century. The Dutch lost control over the East Indies to the Japanese during much of World War II. Following the war, the Dutch fought Indonesian independence forces after Japan surrendered to the Allies in 1945. In 1949, most of what was known as the Dutch East Indies was ceded to the independent Republic of Indonesia. In 1962, also Dutch New Guinea was annexed by Indonesia de facto ending Dutch imperialism in Asia.

== British in India ==
=== Portuguese, French, and British competition in India (1600–1763) ===
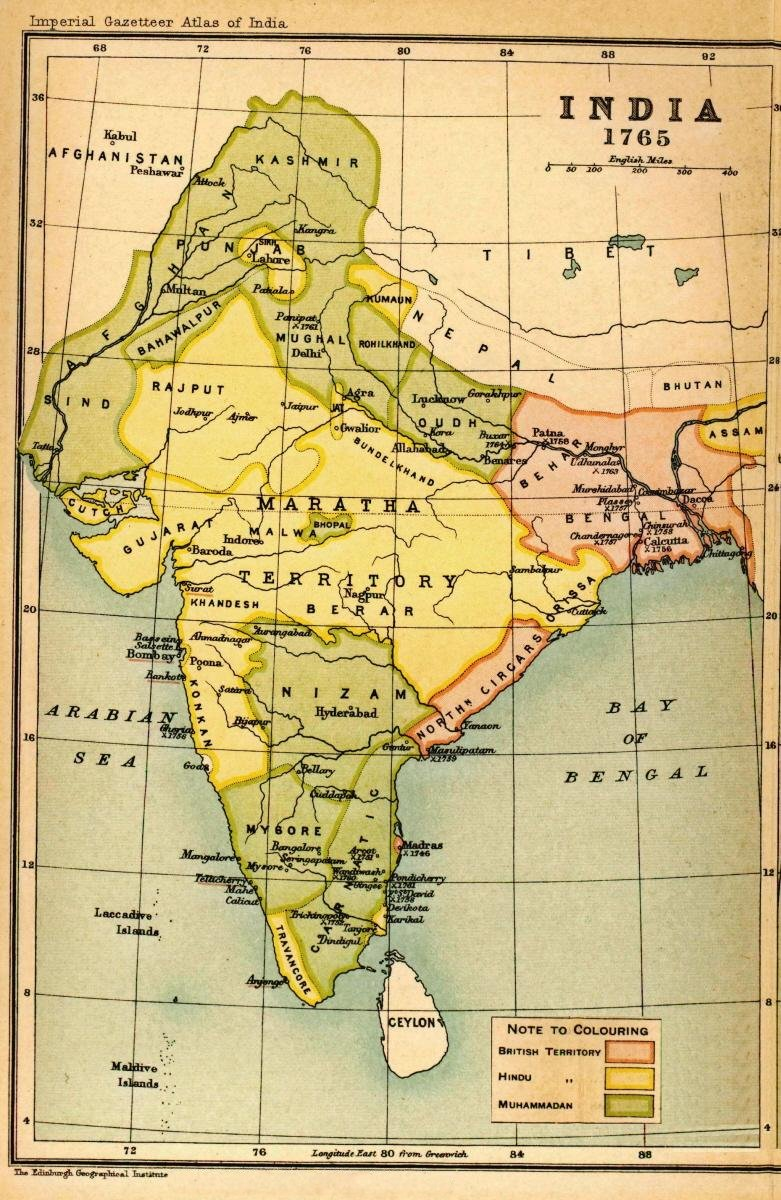
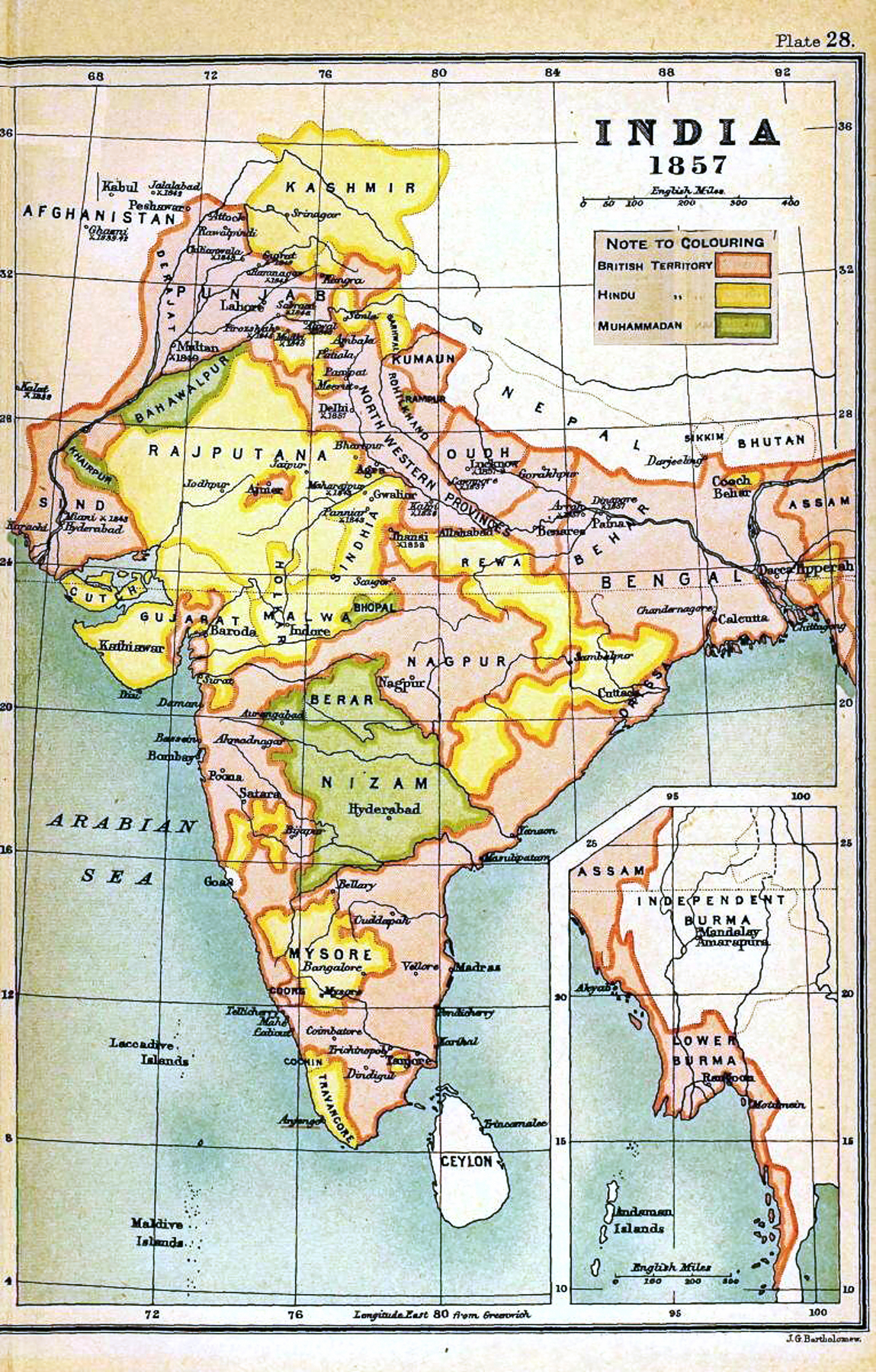
Maps of the Indian subcontinent in 1765 (left) and 1858 (right) showing British expansion in the region.

The English sought to stake out claims in India at the expense of the Portuguese dating back to the Elizabethan era. In 1600, Queen Elizabeth I incorporated the English East India Company (later the British East India Company), granting it a monopoly of trade from the Cape of Good Hope eastward to the Strait of Magellan. In 1639, it acquired Madras on the east coast of India, where it quickly surpassed Portuguese Goa as the principal European trading Centre on the Indian Subcontinent.

Through bribes, diplomacy, and manipulation of weak native rulers, the company prospered in India, where it became the most powerful political force, and outrivaled its Portuguese and French competitors. For more than one hundred years, English and French trading companies had fought one another for supremacy, and, by the middle of the 18th century, competition between the British and the French had heated up. French defeat by the British under the command of Robert Clive during the Seven Years' War (1756–1763) marked the end of the French stake in India.

=== Collapse of Mughal India ===
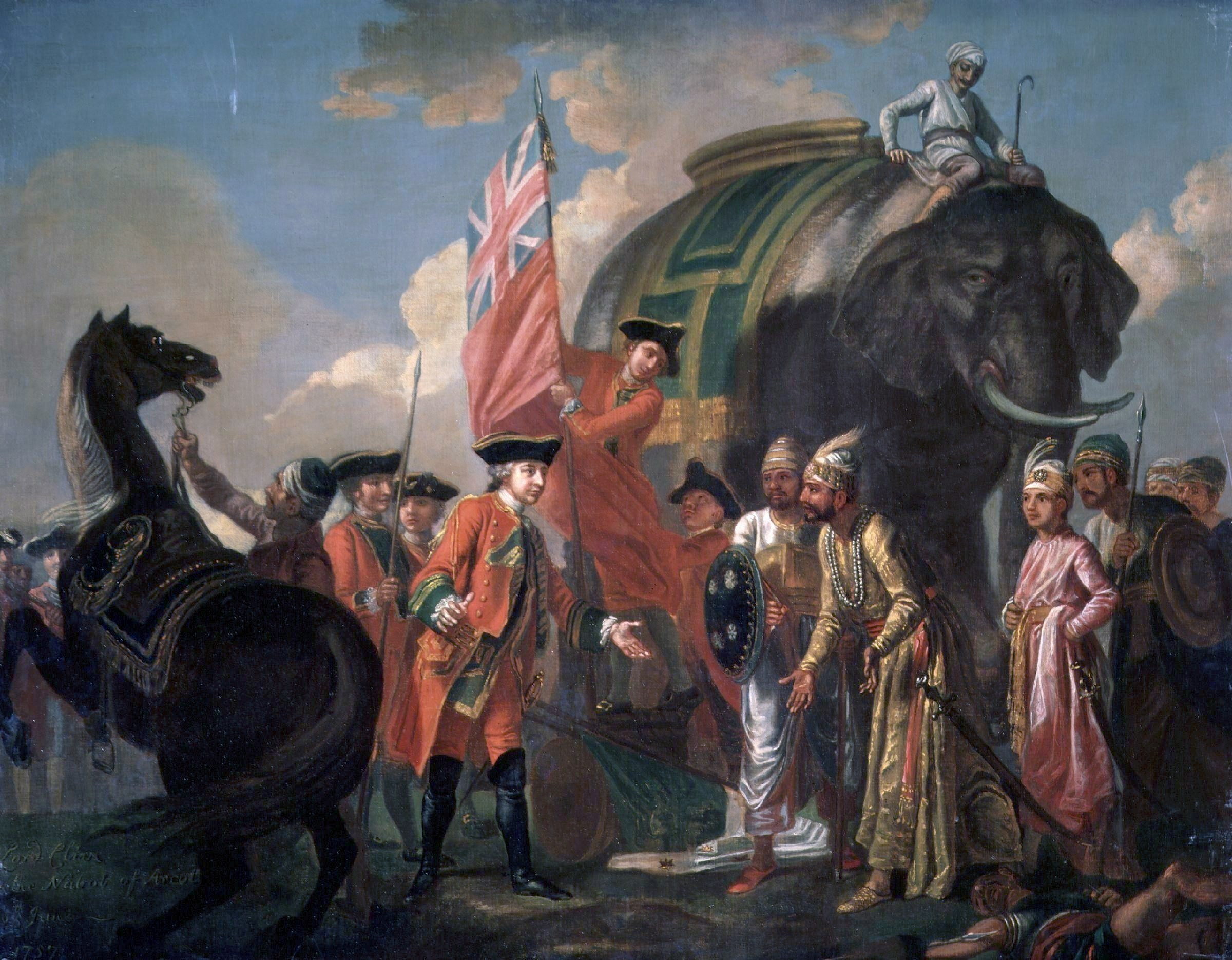
Robert Clive, 1st Baron Clive

The British East India Company, although still in direct competition with French and Dutch interests until 1763, following the subjugation of Bengal at the 1757 Battle of Plassey. The British East India Company made great advances at the expense of the Mughal Empire.

The reign of Aurangzeb had marked the height of Mughal power. By 1690 Mughal territorial expansion reached its greatest extent encompassing the entire Indian Subcontinent. But this period of power was followed by one of decline. Fifty years after the death of Aurangzeb, the great Mughal empire had crumbled. Meanwhile, marauding warlords, nobles, and others bent on gaining power left the Subcontinent increasingly anarchic. Although the Mughals kept the imperial title until 1858, the central government had collapsed, creating a power vacuum.

=== From Company to Crown ===
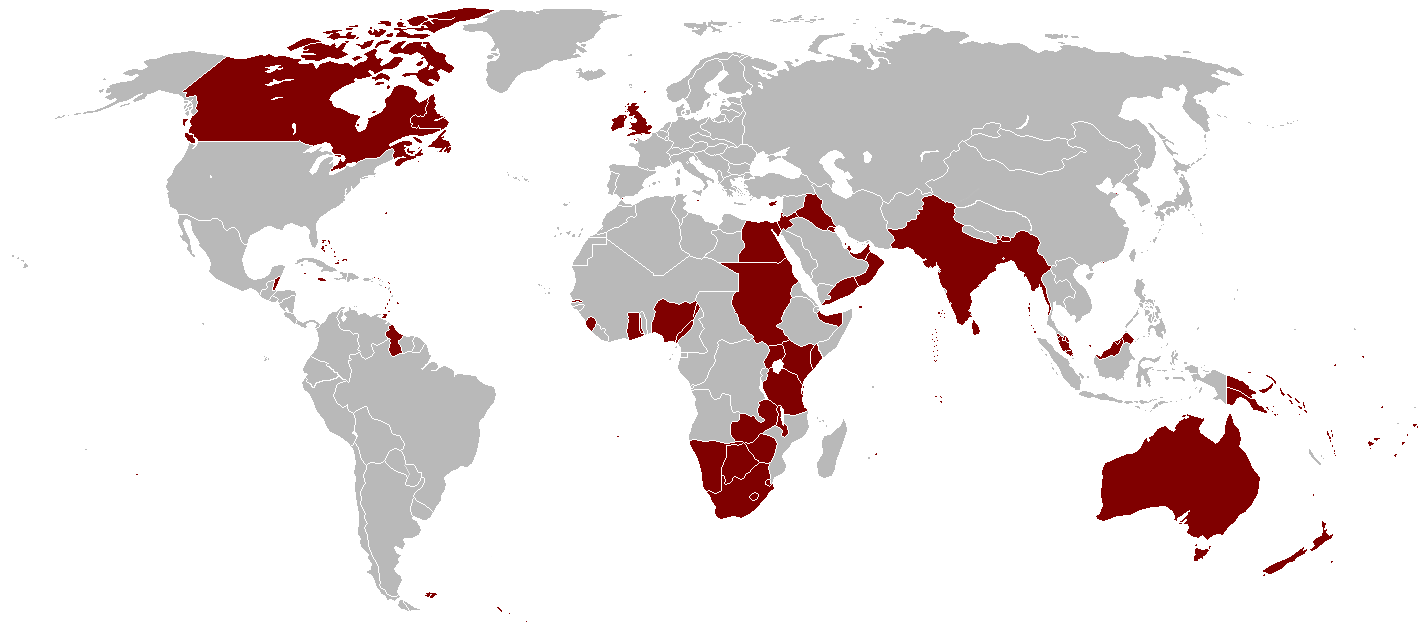
The British Empire in 1920

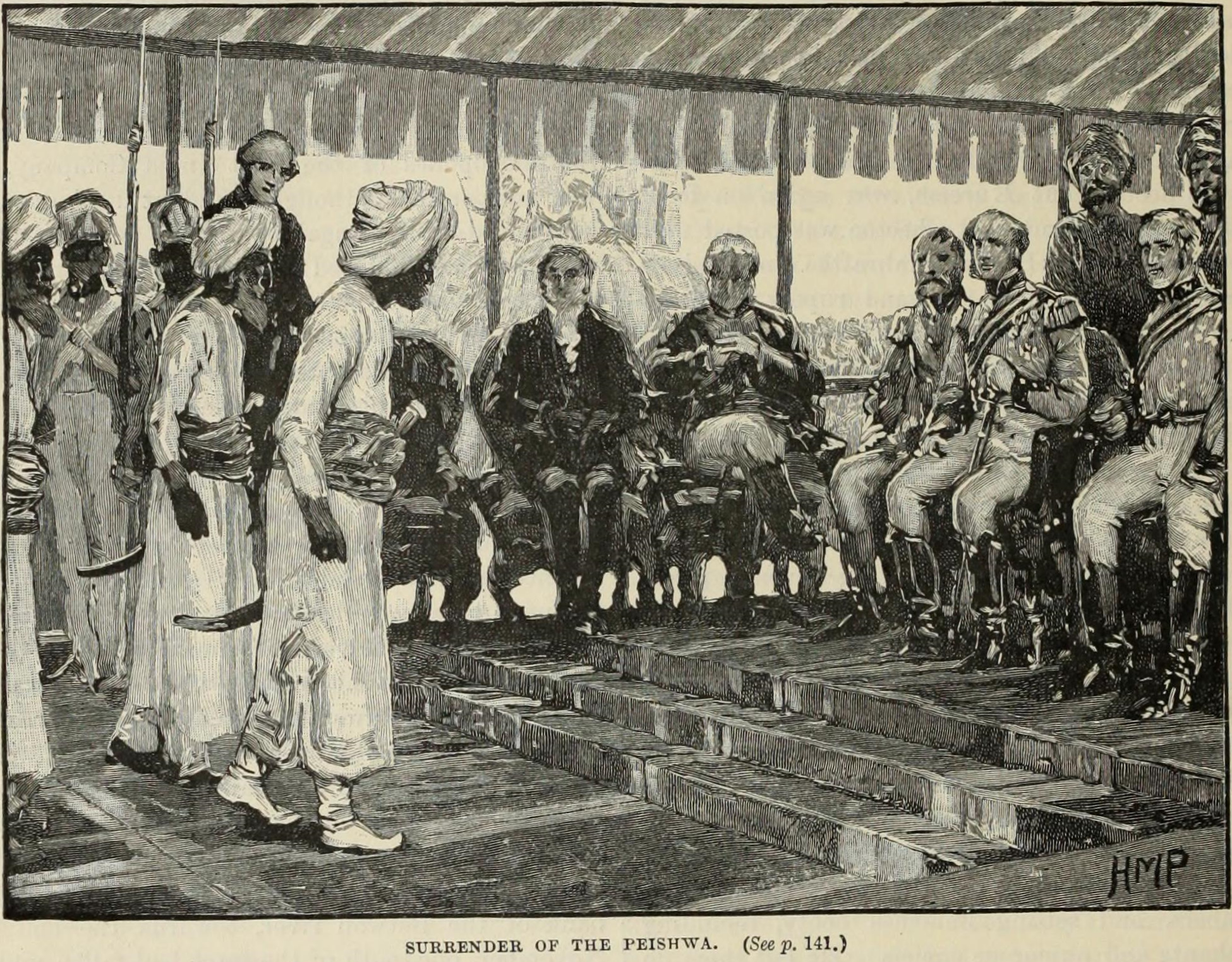
The surrender of Bajirao II in 1818.

Aside from defeating the French during the Seven Years' War, Robert Clive, the leader of the East India Company in India, defeated Siraj ud-Daulah, a key Indian ruler of Bengal, at the decisive Battle of Plassey (1757), a victory that ushered in the beginning of a new period in Indian history, that of informal British rule. While still nominally the sovereign. The transition to formal imperialism, characterized by Queen Victoria being crowned "Empress of India" in the 1870s, was a gradual process. The first step toward cementing formal British control extended back to the late 18th century. The British Parliament, disturbed by the idea that a great business concern, interested primarily in profit, was controlling the destinies of millions of people, passed acts in 1773 and 1784 that gave itself the power to control company policies.

The East India then fought a series of Anglo-Mysore wars in Southern India with the Sultanate of Mysore under Hyder Ali and then Tipu Sultan. Defeats in the First Anglo-Mysore war and stalemate in the Second were followed by victories in the Third and the Fourth. Following Tipu Sultan's death in the fourth war in the Siege of Seringapatam (1799), the kingdom would become a protectorate of the company.

The East India Company fought three Anglo-Maratha Wars with the Maratha Confederacy. The First Anglo-Maratha War ended in 1782 with a restoration of the pre-war status quo. The Second and Third Anglo-Maratha wars resulted in British victories. After the Surrender of Peshwa Bajirao II on 1818, the East India company acquired control of a large majority of the Indian Subcontinent.

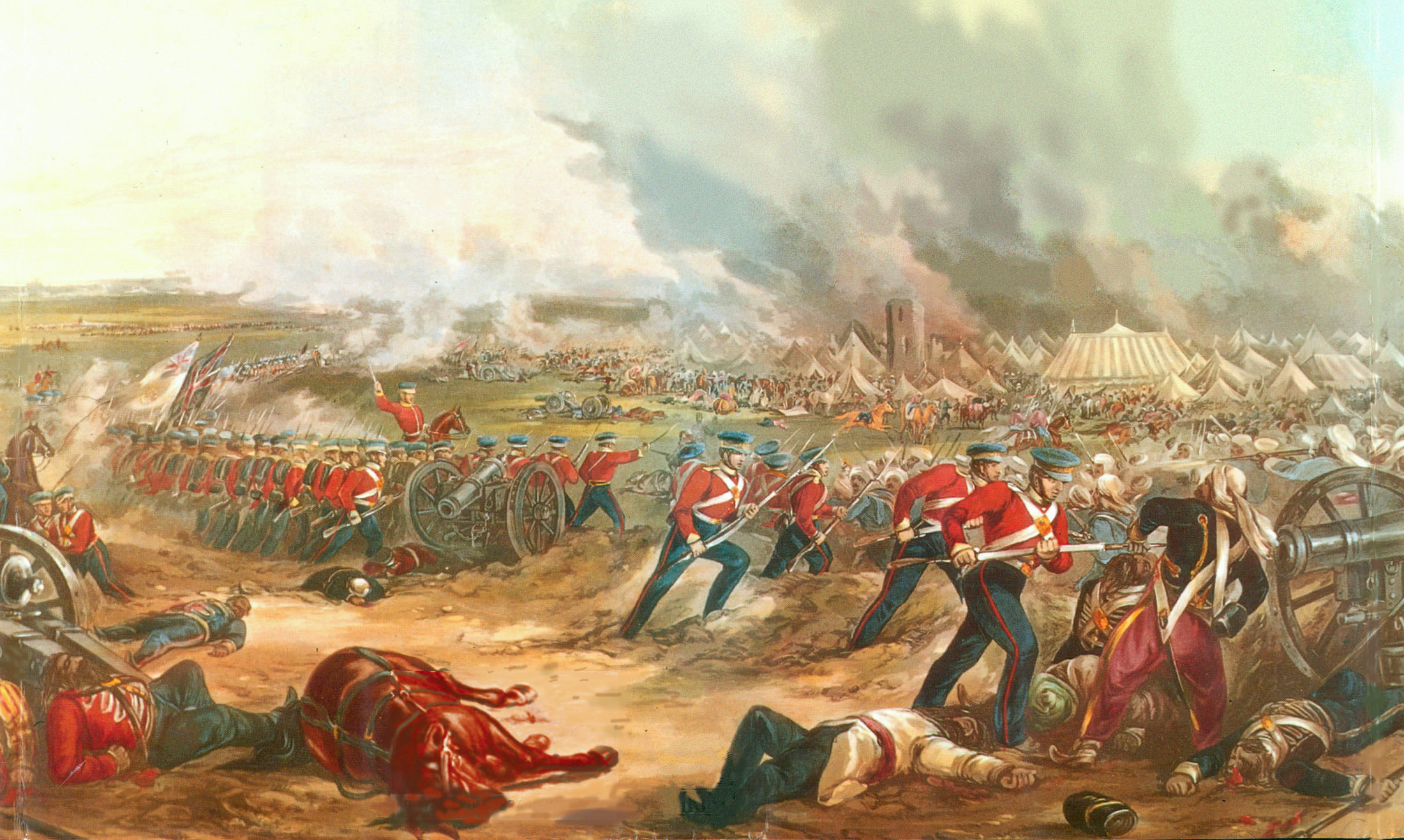
The First Anglo-Sikh War, 1845-1846

Until 1858, however, much of India was still officially the dominion of the Mughal emperor. Anger among some social groups, however, was seething under the governor-generalship of James Dalhousie (1847–1856), who annexed the Punjab (1849) after victory in the Second Sikh War, annexed seven princely states using the doctrine of lapse, annexed the key state of Oudh on the basis of misgovernment, and upset cultural sensibilities by banning Hindu practices such as sati

The 1857 Indian Rebellion, an uprising initiated by Indian troops, called sepoys, who formed the bulk of the company's armed forces, was the key turning point. Rumour had spread among them that their bullet cartridges were lubricated with pig and cow fat. The cartridges had to be bit open, so this upset the Hindu and Muslim soldiers. The Hindu religion held cows sacred, and for Muslims pork was considered haraam. In one camp, 85 out of 90 sepoys would not accept the cartridges from their garrison officer. The British harshly punished those who would not by jailing them. The Indian people were outraged, and on May 10, 1857, sepoys marched to Delhi, and, with the help of soldiers stationed there, captured it. Fortunately for the British, many areas remained loyal and quiescent, allowing the revolt to be crushed after fierce fighting. One important consequence of the revolt was the final collapse of the Mughal dynasty. The mutiny also ended the system of dual control under which the British government and the British East India Company shared authority. The government relieved the company of its political responsibilities, and in 1858, after 258 years of existence, the company relinquished its role. Trained civil servants were recruited from graduates of British universities, and these men set out to rule India. Lord Canning (created earl in 1859), appointed Governor-General of India in 1856, became known as "Clemency Canning" as a term of derision for his efforts to restrain revenge against the Indians during the Indian Mutiny. When the Government of India was transferred from the company to the Crown, Canning became the first viceroy of India.

The Company initiated the first of the Anglo-Burmese Wars in 1824, which led to total annexation of Burma by the Crown in 1885. The British ruled Burma as a province of British India until 1937, then administered her separately under the Burma Office except during the Japanese occupation of Burma, 1942–1945, until granted independence on 4 January 1948. (Unlike India, Burma opted not to join the Commonwealth of Nations.)

=== Rise of Indian nationalism ===
The denial of equal status to Indians was the immediate stimulus for the formation in 1885 of the Indian National Congress, initially loyal to the Empire but committed from 1905 to increased self-government and by 1930 to outright independence. The "Home charges", payments transferred from India for administrative costs, were a lasting source of nationalist grievance, though the flow declined in relative importance over the decades to independence in 1947.

Although majority Hindu and minority Muslim political leaders were able to collaborate closely in their criticism of British policy into the 1920s, British support for a distinct Muslim political organisation, the Muslim League from 1906 and insistence from the 1920s on separate electorates for religious minorities, is seen by many in India as having contributed to Hindu-Muslim discord and the country's eventual Partition.

== France in Indochina ==
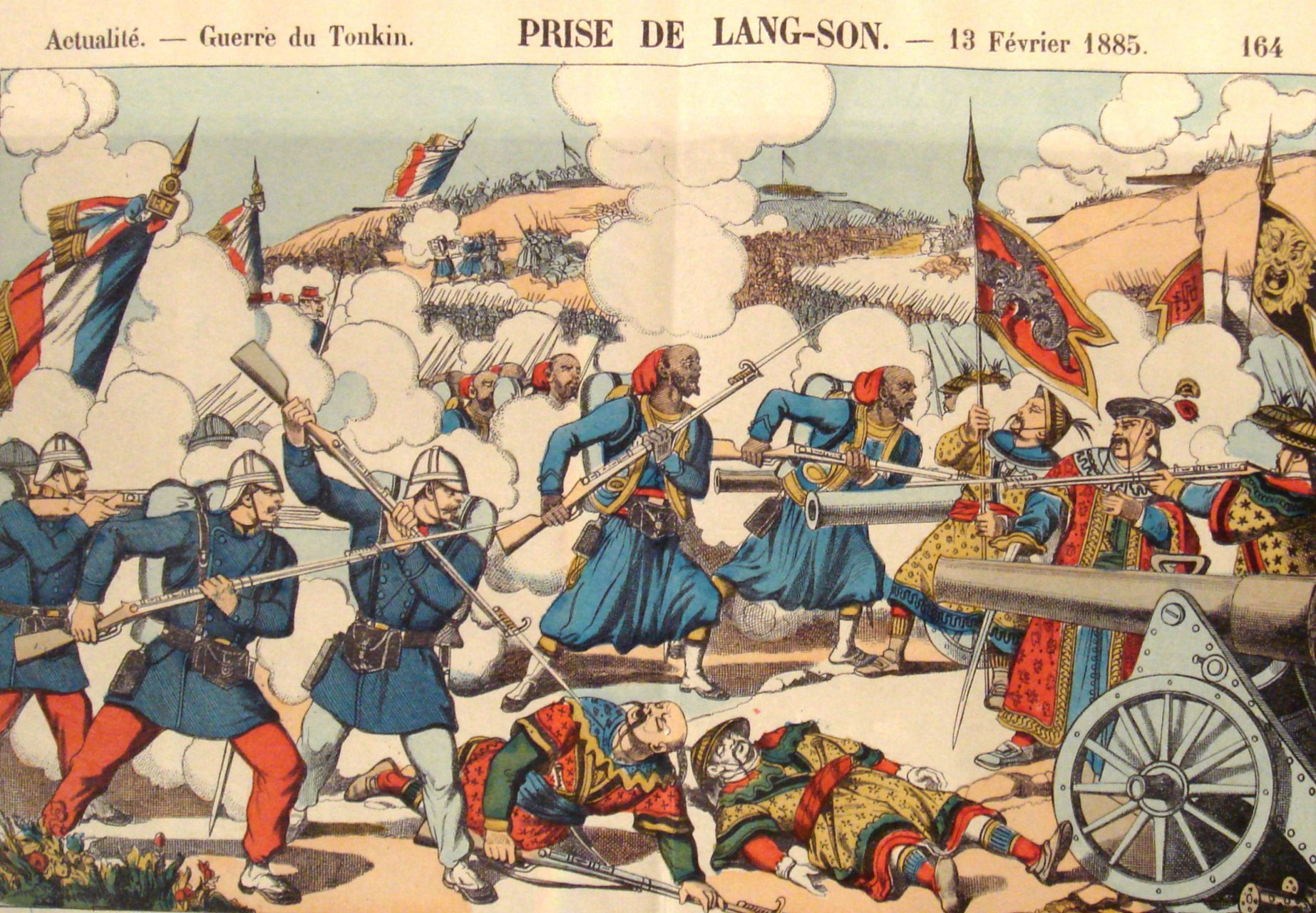
The capture of Lạng Sơn in 1885

France, which had lost its empire to the British by the end of the 18th century, had little geographical or commercial basis for expansion in Southeast Asia. After the 1850s, French imperialism was initially impelled by a nationalistic need to rival the United Kingdom and was supported intellectually by the notion that French culture was superior to that of the people of Annam (Vietnam), and its mission civilisatrice—or its "civilizing mission" of the Annamese through their assimilation to French culture and the Catholic religion. The pretext for French expansionism in Indochina was the protection of French religious missions in the area, coupled with a desire to find a southern route to China through Tonkin, the European name for a region of northern Vietnam.

French religious and commercial interests were established in Indochina as early as the 17th century, but no concerted effort at stabilizing the French position was possible in the face of British strength in the Indian Ocean and French defeat in Europe at the beginning of the 19th century. A mid-19th century religious revival under the Second Empire provided the atmosphere within which interest in Indochina grew. Anti-Christian persecutions in the Far East provided the pretext for the bombardment of Tourane (Danang) in 1847, and invasion and occupation of Danang in 1857 and Saigon in 1858. Under Napoleon III, France decided that French trade with China would be surpassed by the British, and accordingly the French joined the British against China in the Second Opium War from 1857 to 1860, and occupied parts of Vietnam as its gateway to China.

By the Treaty of Saigon in 1862, on June 5, the Vietnamese emperor ceded France three provinces of southern Vietnam to form the French colony of Cochinchina; France also secured trade and religious privileges in the rest of Vietnam and a protectorate over Vietnam's foreign relations. Gradually French power spread through exploration, the establishment of protectorates, and outright annexations. Their seizure of Hanoi in 1882 led directly to war with China (1883–1885), and the French victory confirmed French supremacy in the region. France governed Cochinchina as a direct colony, and central and northern Vietnam under the protectorates of Annam and Tonkin, and Cambodia as protectorates in one degree or another. Laos too was soon brought under French "protection".

By the beginning of the 20th century, France had created an empire in Indochina nearly 50 percent larger than the mother country. A Governor-General in Hanoi ruled Cochinchina directly and the other regions through a system of residents. Theoretically, the French maintained the precolonial rulers and administrative structures in Annam, Tonkin, Cochinchina, Cambodia, and Laos, but in fact the governor-generalship was a centralised fiscal and administrative regime ruling the entire region. Although the surviving native institutions were preserved in order to make French rule more acceptable, they were almost completely deprived of any independence of action. The ethnocentric French colonial administrators sought to assimilate the upper classes into France's "superior culture." While the French improved public services and provided commercial stability, the native standard of living declined and precolonial social structures eroded. Indochina, which had a population of over eighteen million in 1914, was important to France for its tin, pepper, coal, cotton, and rice. It is still a matter of debate, however, whether the colony was commercially profitable.

== Russia and the "Great Game" ==
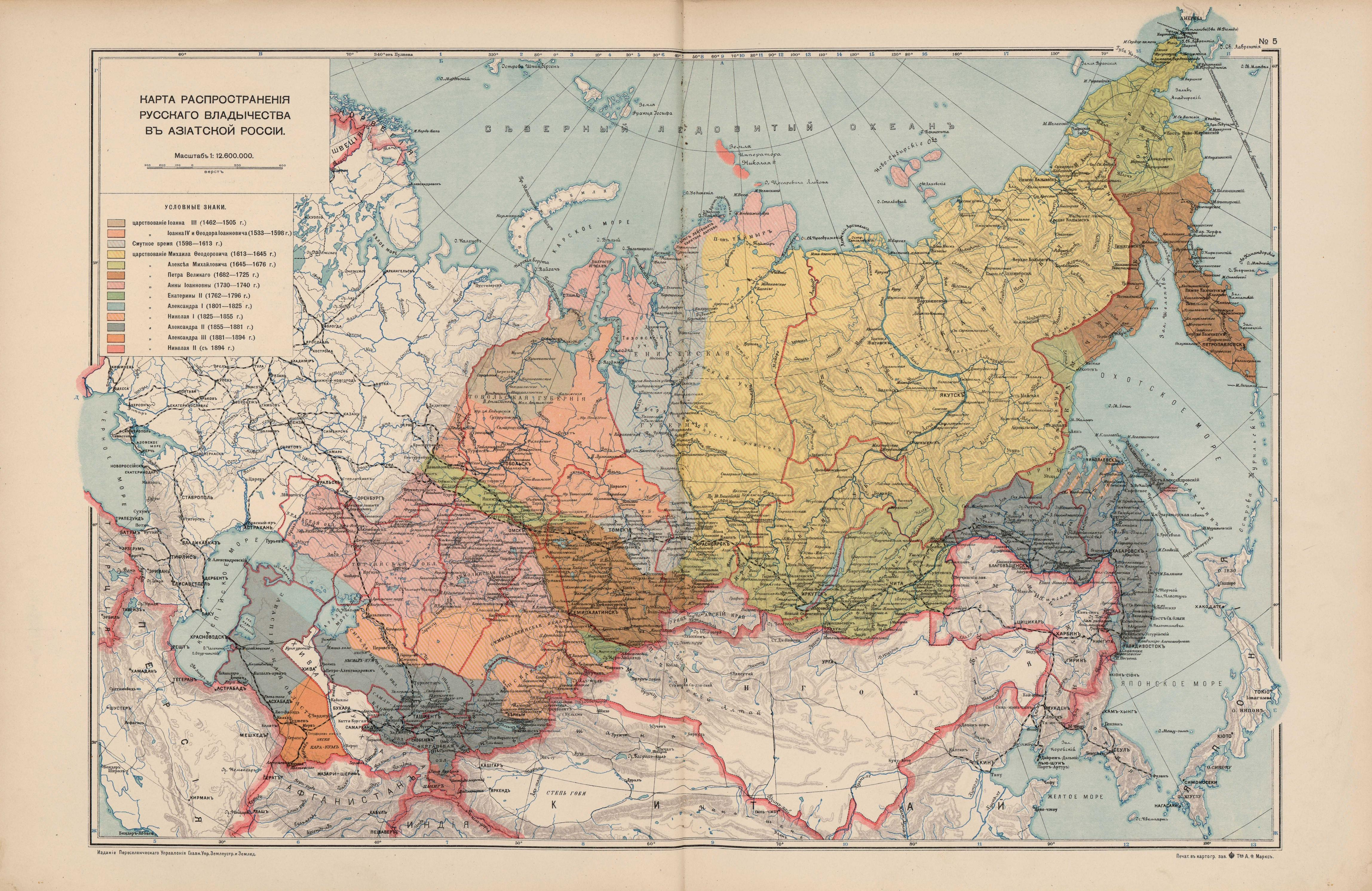
Map of the spread of Russian rule in Asia in the XVI—XIX centuries

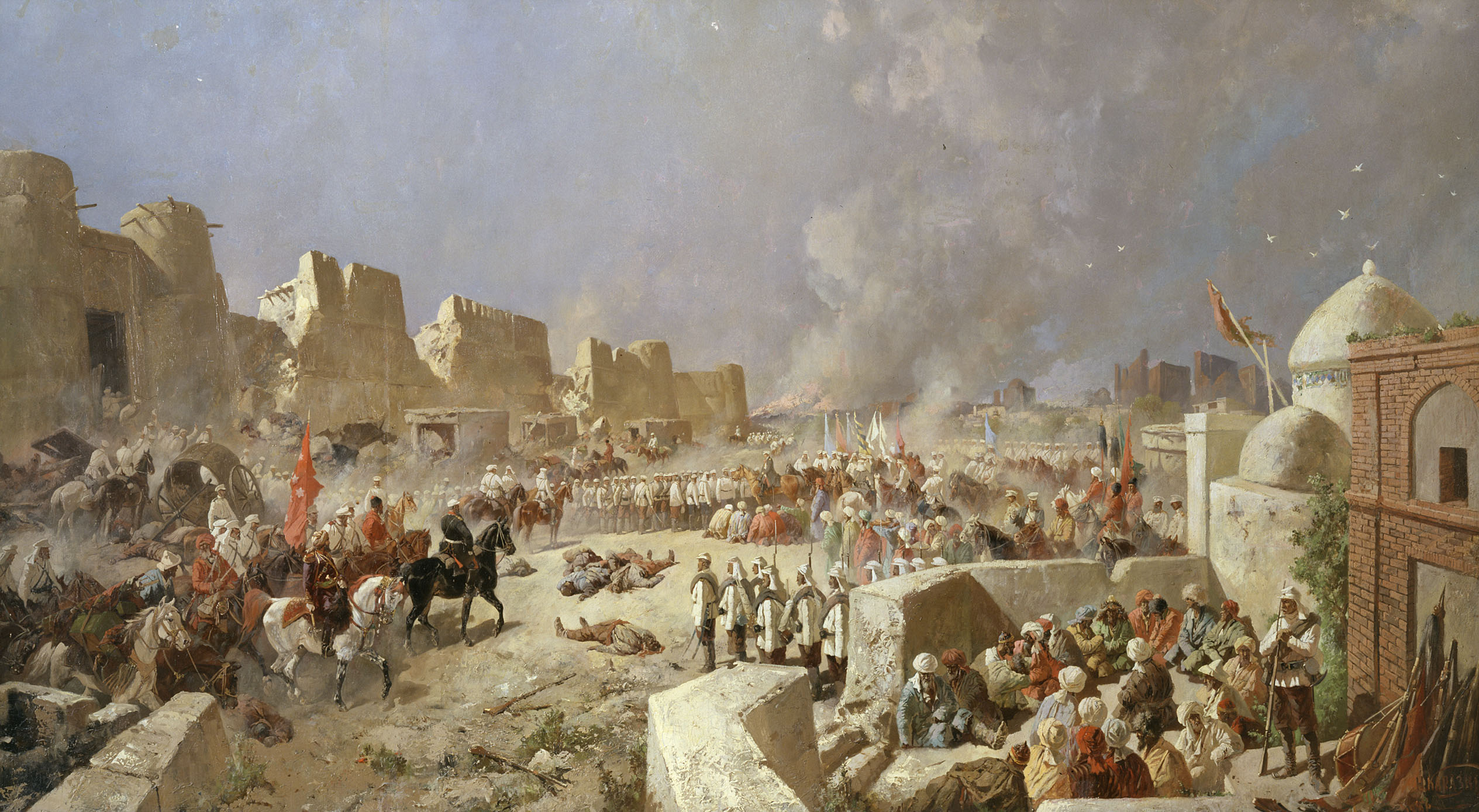
Russian troops taking Samarkand in 1868.

Tsarist Russia is not often regarded as a colonial power alongside the United Kingdom or France because of the manner of Russian expansions: unlike the United Kingdom, which expanded overseas, the Russian Empire grew from a centre outward by a process of accretion, like the United States. In the 19th century, Russian expansion took the form of a struggle of an effectively landlocked country for access to warm-water ports — for example during efforts of Russian foreign minister Alexander Gorchakov (in office: 1856 to 1882) in obtaining access to the previously demilitarised, restricted Black Sea region; and the establishment of Vladivostok as a naval port on the Pacific in 1860.

Historian Michael Khodarkovsky describes Tsarist Russia as a "hybrid empire" that combined elements of continental and "colonial" empires.

Even before the British started consolidating their hold on India, Russian expansion had crossed the Urals by the late-16th century and started moving steadily eastward to the Pacific (reached in the mid-17th century), then toward Alaska, the Caucasus and Central Asia. In the early-19th century the Russian Empire succeeded in conquering the South Caucasus and Dagestan from Qajar Iran following the Russo-Persian War (1804–1813), the Russo-Persian War (1826–1828) and the resultant treaties of Gulistan (1813) and Turkmenchay (1828), giving Russia direct borders with both Iran's as well as Ottoman Turkey's heartlands. Later, the Imperial Russian Army eventually reached the frontiers of Afghanistan as well (which had the largest foreign border adjacent to British holdings in India). In response to Russian expansion, the defense of India's land frontiers and the control of all sea approaches to the subcontinent via the Suez Canal, the Red Sea, and the Persian Gulf became preoccupations of British foreign-policy in the 19th century. Anglo-Russian rivalry in Asia has become known as "the Great Game".

According to Kazakh scholar Kereihan Amanzholov, Russian colonialism had "no essential difference with the colonialist policies of Britain, France, and other European powers".

British and Russian moves in West and Central Asia led to a brief confrontation over Afghanistan in the 1870s. In Iran, both nations set up banks to extend their economic influence. The United Kingdom went so far as to invade Tibet, a land subordinate to the Chinese Qing Empire, in 1904, but withdrew when it became clear that Russian influence was insignificant and when Chinese and Tibetan resistance proved tougher than expected.

Qing China defeated Russia in early Sino-Russian border conflicts (1652–1689), although the Russian Empire later acquired Outer Manchuria in the Amur Annexation of 1858 to 1860 whilst Britain fought China in the Second Opium War of 1856 to 1860. During the Boxer Rebellion, the Russian Empire invaded Manchuria in 1900, and the Blagoveshchensk massacre occurred against Chinese residents on the Russian side of the China–Russia border.

In 1907, the United Kingdom and Russia (then ruled by Emperor Nicholas II) signed the Anglo-Russian Entente, which, on the surface, ended their rivalry in Central Asia. As part of the Entente, Russia agreed to deal with the sovereign of Afghanistan only through British intermediaries. In turn, the United Kingdom would not annex or occupy Afghanistan. Both Russia and the United Kingdom recognised Chinese suzerainty over Tibet, since nominal control by a weak China was preferable to control by either Great Power. Persia was divided into Russian and British spheres of influence and an intervening "neutral" zone. The United Kingdom and Russia chose to reach these uneasy compromises because of growing concern on the part of both powers over German expansion in strategic areas of China and Africa.

Following the Entente, Russia increasingly intervened in Persian domestic politics and suppressed nationalist movements that threatened both Saint Petersburg and London. After the Russian Revolutions of 1917, Russia gave up its claim to a sphere of influence, though Soviet involvement (during the Stalin era) persisted alongside the United Kingdom's — notably in the Anglo-Soviet invasion of Iran in 1941 — until the 1950s.

In 1903, a German company started to construct a railroad from Constantinople to Baghdad in the Ottoman Empire. Plans envisaged extending rails to the Persian Gulf port of Basra. The Trans-Iranian Railway from the north of Iran to the south, connecting Central Asia with the Persian Gulf, though planned before World War I, only materialised with Iranian finance and American, German and Danish participation in the period 1927 to 1938. Germany wanted to gain economic influence in the region and then, perhaps, move on to India. This scheme encountered bitter resistance from the United Kingdom, Russia, and France, who divided the region, formally and informally, among themselves.

== Western European and Russian intrusions into China ==
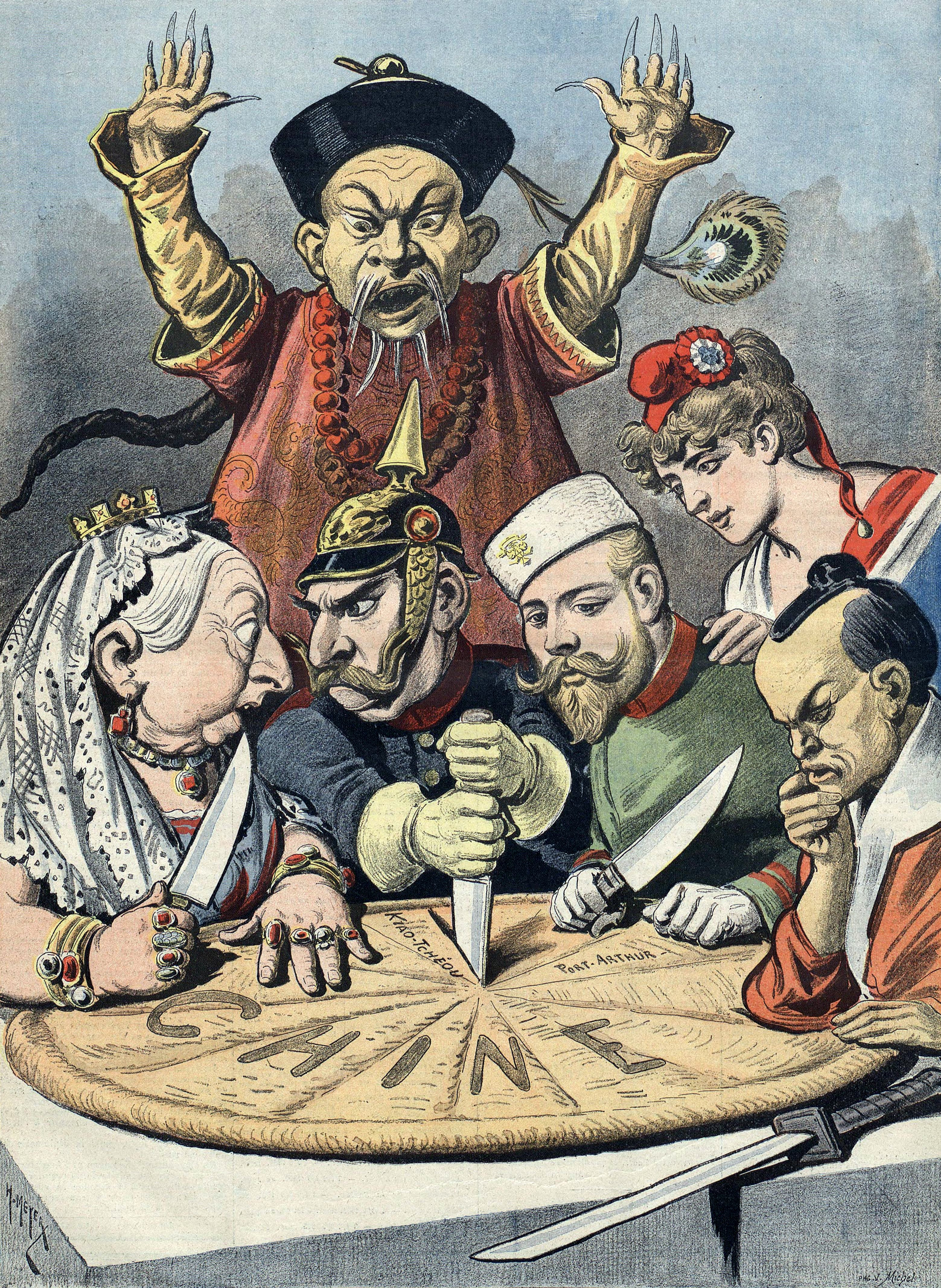
An 1898 French political cartoon depicting Britain, France, Russia, Germany, and Japan dividing China

During the 19th and 20th centuries, foreign powers practiced imperialism in China through the imposition of unequal treaties, opening of treaty ports, and establishment of foreign concessions and leased territories. Starting with the 1842 Treaty of Nanking following the Qing dynasty's defeat by Britain in the First Opium War, various foreign powers, including Britain, France, the United States, Russia, Germany, and Japan, forced China to concede sovereignty and in turn gained territorial, economic, and legal privileges from China. Chinese historians widely include China's subjugation to foreign powers as part of the "century of humiliation."

Within treaty ports, foreign powers controlled enclaves, known as concessions; and gained leases on territories that operated as de facto colonies. Foreign citizens in these areas were granted extraterritoriality, exempting them from Chinese legal jurisdiction in favor of their own consular courts. Foreign powers also maintained their own police forces, military garrisons, and independent taxation systems. The Scramble for China in the late 19th century saw a rapid acceleration of this process, as major powers carved out exclusive spheres of influence across the country, a trend only partially checked by the United States' Open Door Policy.

The foreign presence led to major changes to China's economy and society. Major treaty ports, particularly in Shanghai and Tianjin, became hubs of industrialization, Western education, and international trade. They introduced Western manufacturing, banking systems, and cultural practices to the region. At the same time, the loss of national sovereignty, along with social and legal inequalities between foreigners and natives, sparked Chinese resistance to foreign imperialism resulting in events such as the Boxer Rebellion and May Fourth movement.

The framework of unequal treaties slowly began to diminish after the establishment of the Republic of China. Amidst the Second Sino-Japanese War and World War II in the 1940s, most foreign powers relinquished their extraterritorial rights and concessions. The Chinese Communist Party abolished the remaining concessions after prevailing in the Chinese Civil War, although the final vestiges of foreign imperialism remained until the handover of Hong Kong in 1997 and the handover of Macau in 1999. The legacy of this period has greatly shaped China and is reflected today in its foreign policy, national identity, and economy.

== U.S. imperialism in Asia ==
In 1898 the U.S. annexed the former Hawaiian Kingdom following its overthrow in an 1893 coup d'etat. In 1959, Hawaii was admitted as the 50th U.S. state. Palmyra Atoll, which had been a part of the Territory of Hawaii was not included in the statehood admission and remains a U.S. territory.

Some Americans in the 19th century advocated for the annexation of Taiwan from China. Taiwanese aborigines often attacked and massacred shipwrecked western sailors. In 1867, during the Rover incident, Taiwanese aborigines attacked shipwrecked American sailors, killing the entire crew. They subsequently defeated a retaliatory expedition by the American military and killed another American during the battle.

As the United States emerged as a new imperial power in the Pacific and Asia, one of the two oldest Western imperialist powers in the regions, Spain, was finding it increasingly difficult to maintain control of territories it had held in the regions since the 16th century. In 1896, a widespread revolt against Spanish rule broke out in the Philippines. Meanwhile, the recent string of U.S. territorial gains in the Pacific posed an even greater threat to Spain's remaining colonial holdings.

In 1898, the sinking of the USS Maine in Havana harbor led to the Spanish–American War. The U.S. Asiatic Squadron destroyed the Spanish fleet at Manila and U.S. troops captured the Spanish colony of Guam and landed in the Philippines. Spain later agreed by treaty ending the war to cede the Philippines in Asia and Guam in the Pacific, along with the Caribbean island of Puerto Rico. The treaty also marked the end of Spanish rule in Cuba, which was to be granted nominal independence but remained heavily influenced by the U.S. government and U.S. business interests. One year following its treaty with Spain, the U.S. annexed the small Pacific outpost of Wake Island.

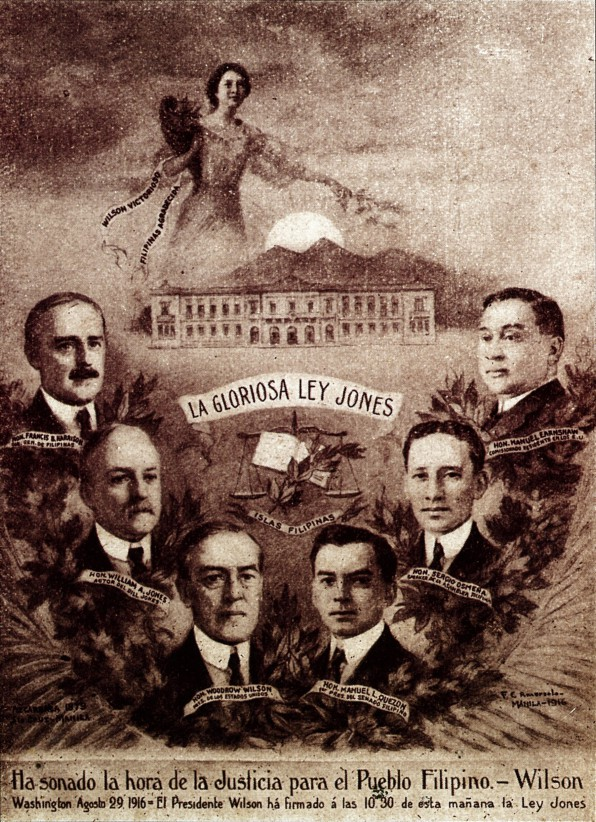
Philippine poster advertising the 1916 passage of the Jones Law that increased colonial autonomy

The Filipinos, who assisted U.S. troops in fighting the Spanish, wished to establish an independent state and, on June 12, 1898, declared independence from Spain. In 1899, fighting between the Filipino nationalists and the U.S. broke out; it took the U.S. almost fifteen years to fully subdue the insurgency. The U.S. sent 70,000 troops and suffered thousands of casualties. The Filipinos insurgents, however, suffered considerably higher casualties than the Americans. Most casualties in the war were civilians dying primarily from disease and famine.

U.S. counter-insurgency operations in rural areas often included scorched earth tactics which involved burning down villages and concentrating civilians into camps known as "protected zones". The execution of U.S. soldiers taken prisoner by the Filipinos led to disproportionate reprisals by American forces.

The Moro Muslims fought against the Americans in the Moro Rebellion.

In 1914, Dean C. Worcester, U.S. Secretary of the Interior for the Philippines (1901–1913) described "the regime of civilisation and improvement which started with American occupation and resulted in developing naked savages into cultivated and educated men". Nevertheless, some Americans, such as Mark Twain, deeply opposed American involvement/imperialism in the Philippines, leading to the abandonment of attempts to construct a permanent U.S. naval base and using it as an entry point to the Chinese market. In 1916, Congress guaranteed the independence of the Philippines by 1945.

== World War I: changes in imperialism ==
World War I brought about the fall of several empires in Europe. This had repercussions around the world. The defeated Central Powers included Germany and the Turkish Ottoman Empire. Germany lost all of its colonies in Asia. German New Guinea, a part of Papua New Guinea, became administered by Australia. German possessions and concessions in China, including Qingdao, became the subject of a controversy during the Paris Peace Conference when the Beiyang government in China agreed to cede these interests to Japan, to the anger of many Chinese people. Although the Chinese diplomats refused to sign the agreement, these interests were ceded to Japan with the support of the United States and the United Kingdom.

Turkey gave up her provinces; Syria, Palestine, and Mesopotamia (now Iraq) came under French and British control as League of Nations Mandates. The discovery of petroleum first in Iran and then in the Arab lands in the interbellum provided a new focus for activity on the part of the United Kingdom, France, and the United States (see History of the Middle East#World War I).

== Japan ==
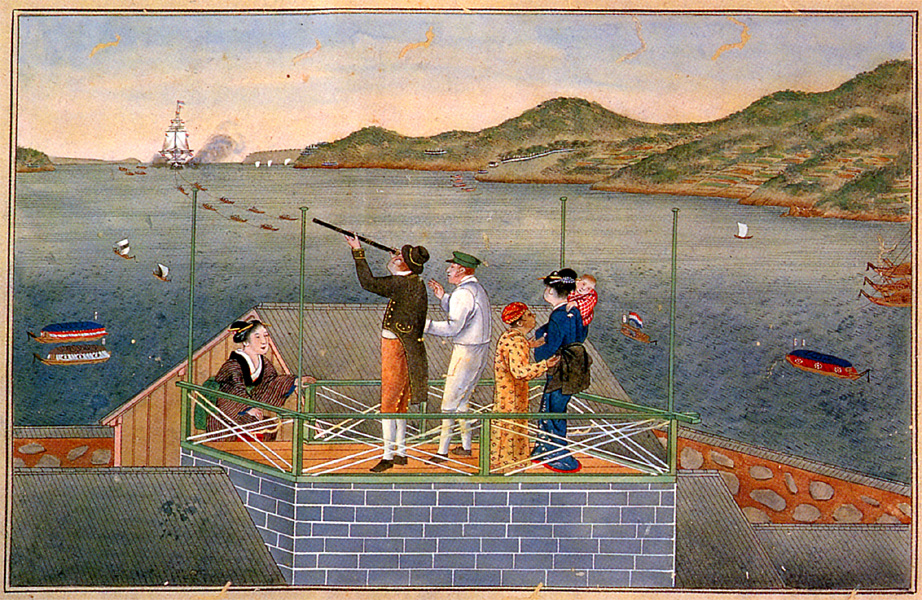
Europeans in Dejima, the Dutch trading colony in the harbor of Nagasaki, early 19th century.

In 1641, all Westerners were thrown out of Japan. For the next two centuries, Japan was free from Western contact, except for at the port of Nagasaki, which Japan allowed Dutch merchant vessels to enter on a limited basis.

Japan's freedom from Western contact ended on 8 July 1853, when Commodore Matthew Perry of the U.S. Navy sailed a squadron of black-hulled warships into Edo (modern Tokyo) harbor. The Japanese told Perry to sail to Nagasaki but he refused. Perry sought to present a letter from U.S. President Millard Fillmore to the emperor which demanded concessions from Japan. Japanese authorities responded by stating that they could not present the letter directly to the emperor, but scheduled a meeting on 14 July with a representative of the emperor. On 14 July, the squadron sailed towards the shore, giving a demonstration of their cannon's firepower thirteen times. Perry landed with a large detachment of Marines and presented the emperor's representative with Fillmore's letter. Perry said he would return, and did so, this time with even more war ships. The U.S. show of force led to Japan's concession to the Convention of Kanagawa on 31 March 1854. This treaty conferred extraterritoriality on American nationals, as well as, opening up further treaty ports beyond Nagasaki. This treaty was followed up by similar treaties with the United Kingdom, the Netherlands, Russia and France. These events made Japanese authorities aware that the country was lacking technologically and needed the strength of industrialism in order to keep their power. This realisation eventually led to a civil war and political reform known the Meiji Restoration.

The Empire of Japan in 1939

The Meiji Restoration of 1868 led to administrative overhaul, deflation and subsequent rapid economic development. Japan had limited natural resources of her own and sought both overseas markets and sources of raw materials, fuelling a drive for imperial conquest which began with the defeat of China in 1895.

Taiwan, ceded by Qing dynasty China, became the first Japanese colony. In 1899, Japan won agreements from the great powers' to abandon extraterritoriality for their citizens, and an alliance with the United Kingdom established it in 1902 as an international power. Its spectacular defeat of Russia's navy in 1905 gave it the southern half of the island of Sakhalin; exclusive Japanese influence over Korea (propinquity); the former Russian lease of the Liaodong Peninsula with Port Arthur (Lüshunkou); and extensive rights in Manchuria (see the Russo-Japanese War).

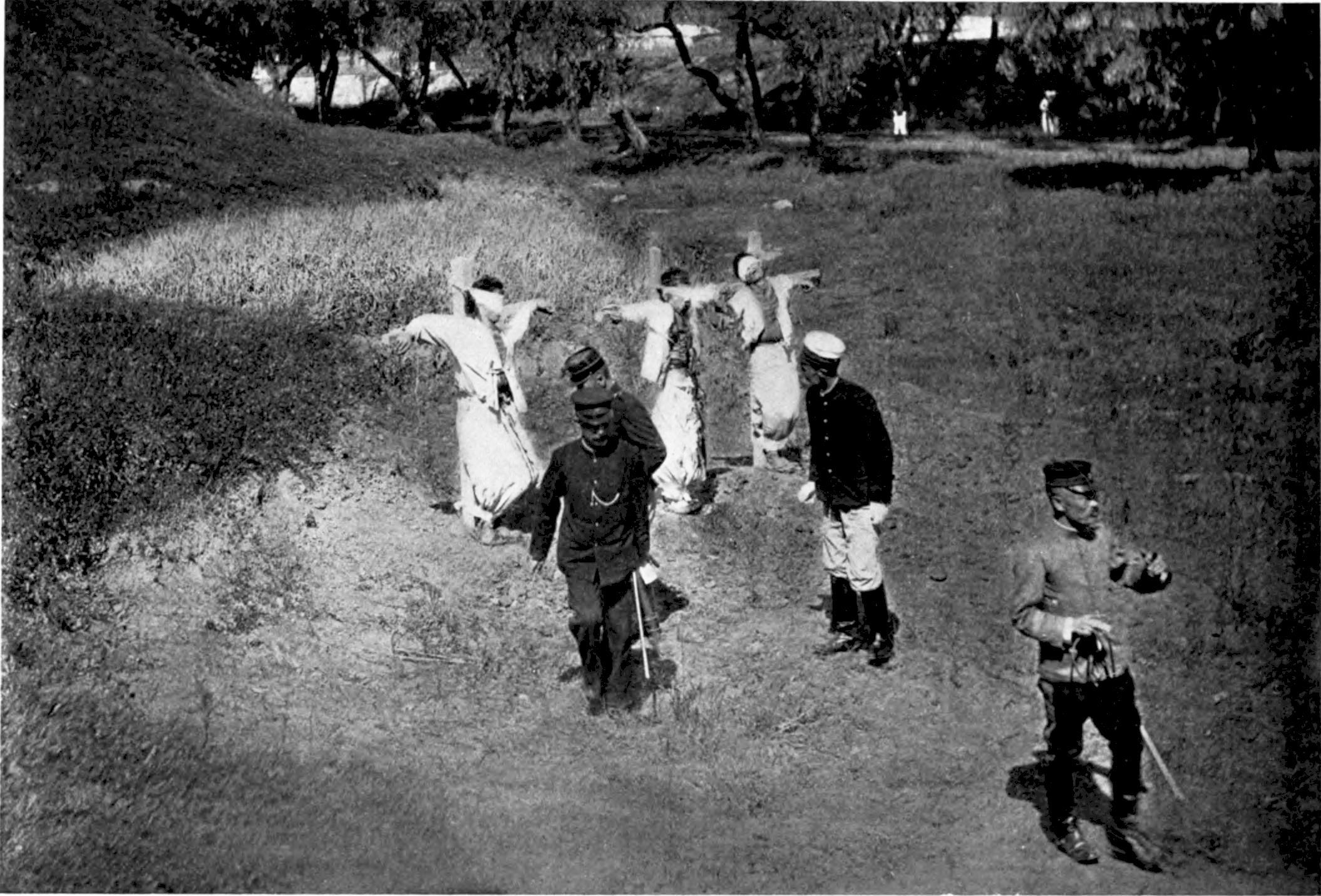
Three Koreans shot for pulling up rails as a protest against seizure of land without payment by Japanese.

The Empire of Japan and the Joseon dynasty in Korea formed bilateral diplomatic relations in 1876. China lost its suzerainty of Korea after defeat in the Sino-Japanese War in 1894. Russia also lost influence on the Korean peninsula with the Treaty of Portsmouth as a result of the Russo-Japanese war in 1904. The Joseon dynasty became increasingly dependent on Japan. Korea became a protectorate of Japan with the Japan–Korea Treaty of 1905. Korea was then de jure annexed to Japan with the Japan–Korea Treaty of 1910.

Japan was now one of the most powerful forces in the Far East, and in 1914, it entered World War I on the side of the Allies, seizing German-occupied Kiaochow and subsequently demanding Chinese acceptance of Japanese political influence and territorial acquisitions (Twenty-One Demands, 1915). Mass protests in Peking in 1919 which sparked widespread Chinese nationalism, coupled with Allied (and particularly U.S.) opinion led to Japan's abandonment of most of the demands and Kiaochow's 1922 return to China. Japan received the German territory from the Treaty of Versailles.

Tensions with China increased over the 1920s, and in 1931 Japanese Kwantung Army based in Manchuria seized control of the region without admission from Tokyo. Intermittent conflict with China led to full-scale war in mid-1937, drawing Japan toward an overambitious bid for Asian hegemony (Greater East Asia Co-Prosperity Sphere), which ultimately led to defeat and the loss of all its overseas territories after World War II (see Japanese expansionism and Japanese nationalism).

== After World War II ==
=== Decolonization and the rise of nationalism in Asia ===
In the aftermath of World War II, European colonies, controlling more than one billion people throughout the world, still ruled most of West Asia, South East Asia, and the Indian Subcontinent. However, the image of European pre-eminence was shattered by the wartime Japanese occupations of large portions of British, French, and Dutch territories in the Pacific. The destabilisation of European rule led to the rapid growth of nationalist movements in Asia—especially in Indonesia, Malaya, Burma, and French Indochina (Vietnam, Cambodia, and Laos).

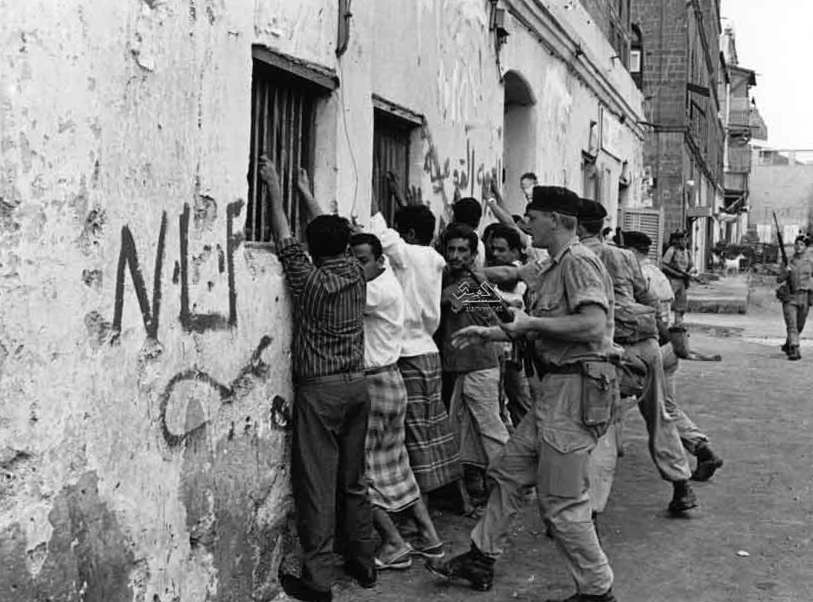
British Army's counter-insurgency campaign in the British controlled territories of South Arabia, 1967

The war, however, only accelerated forces already in existence undermining Western imperialism in Asia. Throughout the colonial world, the processes of urbanisation and capitalist investment created professional merchant classes that emerged as new Westernised elites. While imbued with Western political and economic ideas, these classes increasingly grew to resent their unequal status under European rule.

==== British in India and West Asia ====
In India, the westward movement of Japanese forces towards Bengal during World War II had led to major concessions on the part of British authorities to Indian nationalist leaders. In 1947, the United Kingdom, devastated by war and embroiled in an economic crisis at home, granted British India its independence as two nations: India and Pakistan. Myanmar (Burma) and Sri Lanka (Ceylon), which is also part of British India, also gained their independence from the United Kingdom the following year, in 1948. In West Asia, the United Kingdom granted independence to Jordan in 1946 and two years later, in 1948, ended its mandate of Palestine becoming the independent nation of Israel.

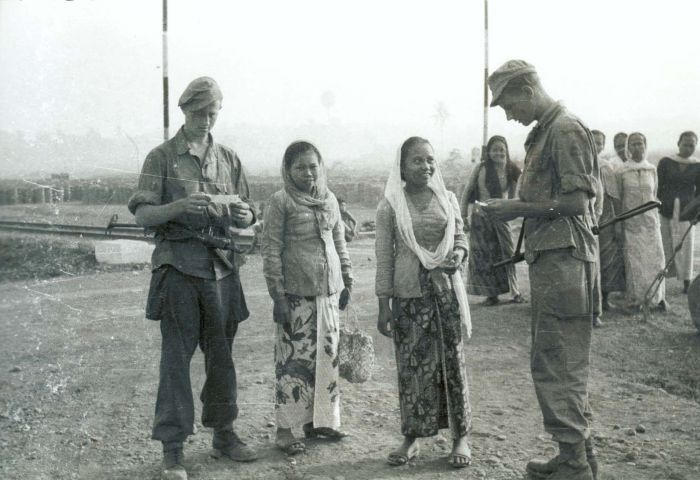
Dutch soldiers control the papers of Javanese women, 1946

Following the end of the war, nationalists in Indonesia demanded complete independence from the Netherlands. A brutal conflict ensued, and finally, in 1949, through United Nations mediation, the Dutch East Indies achieved independence, becoming the new nation of Indonesia. Dutch imperialism moulded this new multi-ethnic state comprising roughly 3,000 islands of the Indonesian archipelago with a population at the time of over 100 million.

The end of Dutch rule opened up latent tensions between the roughly 300 distinct ethnic groups of the islands, with the major ethnic fault line being between the Javanese and the non-Javanese.

Dutch New Guinea was under the Dutch administration until 1962 (see also West New Guinea dispute).

==== United States in Asia ====
In the Philippines, the U.S. remained committed to its previous pledges to grant the islands their independence but exerted pressure for the adoption of a political and economic system similar to the U.S. The Philippines became the first of the Western-controlled Asian colonies to be granted independence post-World War II.

This aim was greatly complicated by the rise of new political forces. During the war, the Hukbalahap (People's Army), which had strong ties to the Communist Party of the Philippines (PKP), fought against the Japanese occupation of the Philippines and won strong popularity among many sectors of the Filipino working class and peasantry. In 1946, the PKP participated in elections as part of the Democratic Alliance. However, with the onset of the Cold War, its growing political strength drew a reaction from the ruling government and the United States, resulting in the repression of the PKP and its associated organizations. In 1948, the PKP began organizing an armed struggle against the government and continued U.S. military presence. In 1950, the PKP created the People's Liberation Army (Hukbong Mapagpalaya ng Bayan), which mobilized thousands of troops throughout the islands. The insurgency lasted until 1956 when the PKP gave up armed struggle.

In 1968, the PKP underwent a split, and in 1969 the Maoist faction of the PKP created the New People's Army. Maoist rebels re-launched an armed struggle against the government and the U.S. military presence in the Philippines, which continues to this day.

==== France in Indochina ====
===== Post-war resistance to French rule =====
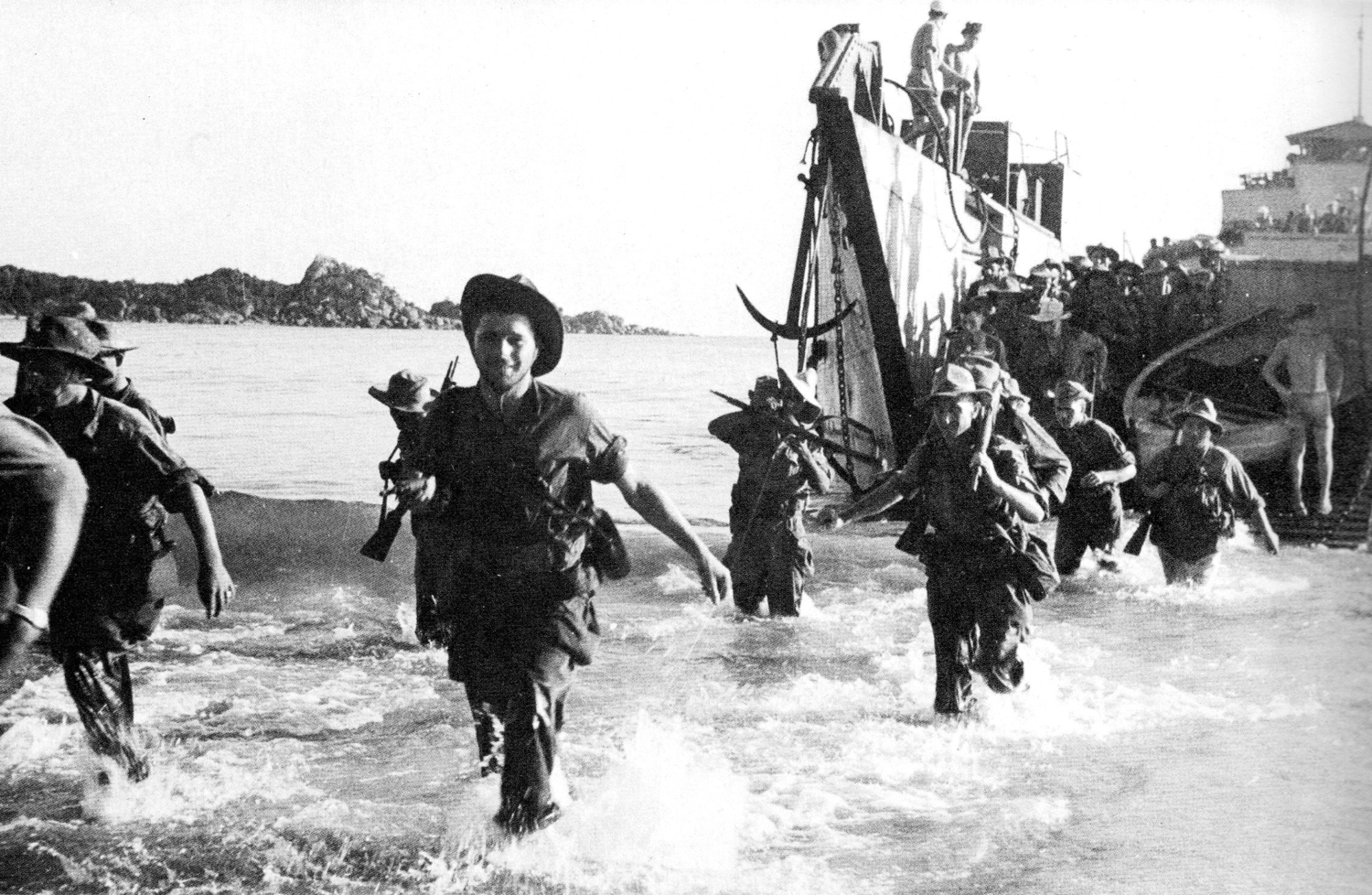
French Marine commandos wade ashore off the Annam coast in July 1950

France remained determined to retain its control of Indochina. However, in Hanoi, in 1945, a broad front of nationalists and communists, commonly referred to as the Viet Minh, led by Ho Chi Minh declared an independent Democratic Republic of Vietnam. France, seeking to regain control of Vietnam, countered with a vague offer of self-government under French rule. France's offers were unacceptable to Vietnamese nationalists; and in December 1946 the Việt Minh launched a rebellion against the French authority governing the colonies of French Indochina. The first few years of the war involved a low-level rural insurgency against French authority. However, after the Chinese communists reached the Northern border of Vietnam in 1949, the conflict turned into a conventional war between two armies equipped with modern weapons supplied by the United States and the Soviet Union. Meanwhile, the France granted the State of Vietnam based in Saigon independence in 1949 while Laos and Cambodia received independence in 1953. The US recognized the regime in Saigon, and provided the French military effort with military aid.

Meanwhile, in Vietnam, the French war against the Viet Minh continued for nearly eight years. The French were gradually worn down by guerrilla and jungle fighting. The turning point for France occurred at Dien Bien Phu in 1954, which resulted in the surrender of ten thousand French troops. Paris was forced to accept a political settlement that year at the Geneva Conference, which led to a precarious set of agreements regarding the future political status of Laos, Cambodia, and Vietnam.

== List of European colonies in Asia ==
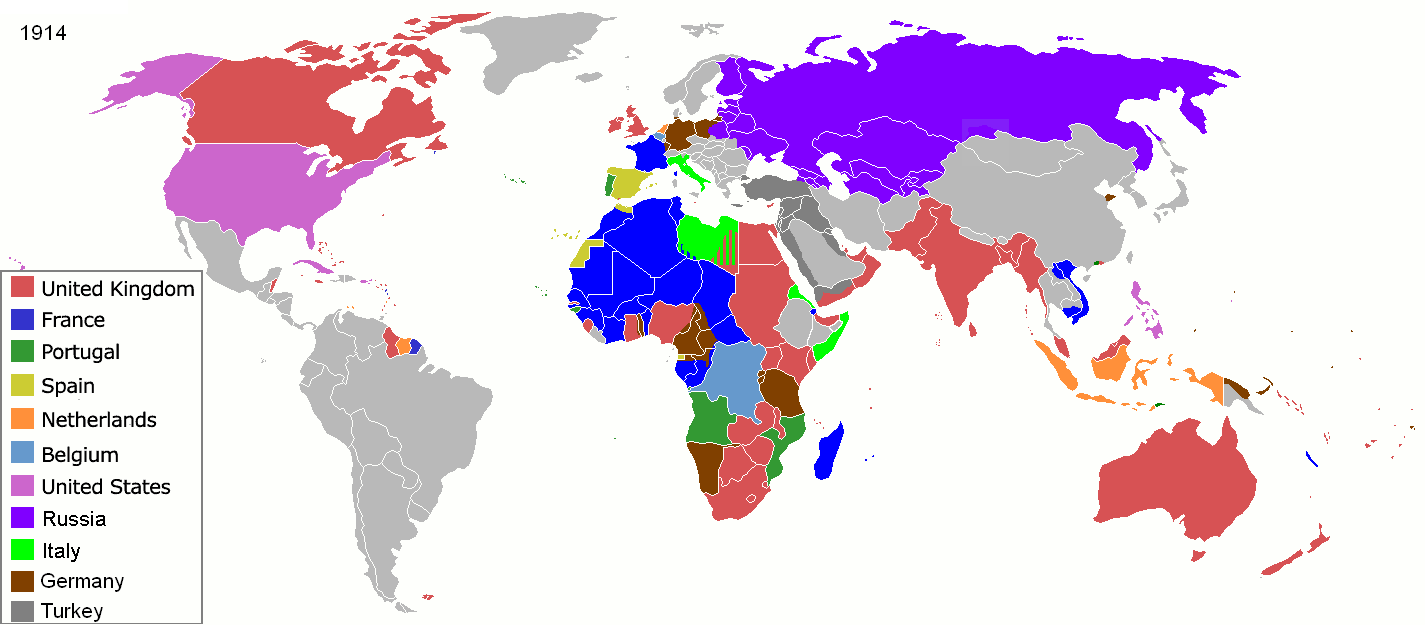
Imperial powers in 1914

British colonies in East Asia, South Asia, and Southeast Asia:

- (British rule in Burma) British Burma (1824–1948, merged with India by the British from 1886 to 1937)
- British Ceylon (1815–1948, now Sri Lanka)
- British Hong Kong (1842–1997)
- (British Raj) Colonial India (includes the territory of present-day India, Pakistan and Bangladesh)

Danish India (1696–1869)
(Sweden) Swedish Parangipettai (1733)
British India (1613–1947)

British East India Company (1757–1858)
British Raj (1858–1947)
(Kingdom of Sikkim) Sikkim (1861–1947) (British protectorate)

- (British Empire) Malaya (now part of Malaysia):

(British Empire) British Malaya, included:

Straits Settlements (1826–1946)
Federated Malay States (1895–1946)
Unfederated Malay States (1885–1946)

Federation of Malaya (under British rule, 1948–1963)
(British Empire) British Borneo (now part of Malaysia), including:

Labuan (1848–1946)
North Borneo (1882–1941)

Crown Colony of North Borneo (1946–1963)

Crown Colony of Sarawak (1946–1963)

Brunei (1888–1984) (British protectorate)
(British Empire) Singapore – British colony (1819–1959)

- Afghanistan (1879–1919) (British protectorate)
- Bhutan (1910–1947) (British protectorate)
- Nepal (1816–1923) (British protectorate)

French colonies in South and Southeast Asia:

- French India (1769–1954)
- French Indochina (1887–1953), including:

- Laos (French protectorate) (1893–1953)
- Cambodia (French protectorate) (1863–1953)
- Annam (French protectorate), Cochinchina, Tonkin (now Vietnam) (1883–1953)

Dutch, Spanish, Portuguese, American colonies and Russian territories in Asia:

- Dutch India (1605–1825)
- Dutch Bengal
- Dutch Ceylon (1656–1796)
- Portuguese Ceylon (1505–1658)
- Dutch East Indies (now Indonesia) – Dutch colony from 1602 to 1949 (included Dutch New Guinea until 1962)
- Portuguese India (1510–1961)
- Portuguese Macau – Portuguese colony, the first European colony in China (1557–1999)
- (Dutch Empire) Dutch Malacca (1641–1824)
- (Portuguese Empire) Portuguese Malacca (1511–1641)
- Portuguese Timor (1702–1975, now East Timor)
- Outer Manchuria – ceded to Russian Empire through Treaty of Aigun (1858) and Treaty of Peking (1860)
- Philippines:

(Spanish Empire) Spanish Philippines (1565–1898, 3rd longest European occupation in Asia, 333 years),
Insular Government of the Philippine Islands and Commonwealth of the Philippines, United States colony (1898–1946)

- Taiwan:

(Spanish Empire) Spanish Formosa (1626–1642)
Dutch Formosa (1624–1662)

British protectorates in West Asia:

- Bahrain

- (Portuguese Empire) Portuguese Bahrain (1521–1602)
- British Protectorate (1861–1971)

- Iraq

- Mandatory Iraq (1920–1932) (British protectorate)
- Kingdom of Iraq (1932–1958)

- Israel and Palestine

- Mandatory Palestine (1920–1948) (British Mandate)

- Jordan

- Emirate of Transjordan (1921–1946) (British protectorate)

- Kuwait

- Sheikhdom of Kuwait (1899–1961) (British protectorate)

- Lebanon and Syria

- (France) French Mandate for Syria and the Lebanon (1923–1946)

- Oman

- (Portuguese Empire) Portuguese Oman (1507–1650)
- Muscat and Oman (1892–1971) (British protectorate)

- Qatar

- British protectorate of Qatar (1916–1971)

- United Arab Emirates

- Trucial States (1820–1971) (British protectorate)

- Yemen

- (Aden Colony) Aden Protectorate (1869–1963)
- (Aden Colony) Colony of Aden (1937–1963)
- Federation of South Arabia (1962–1967)
- (British Empire) Protectorate of South Arabia (1963–1967)

== Independent states ==
- Mongolia – in Russian sphere of influence and later Soviet controlled
- Iran – in Russian sphere of influence in the north and British in the south
- Siam – the only independent state in Southeast Asia, but bordered by a British sphere of influence in the north and south and French influence in the northeast and east

== See also ==
- Vassal and tributary states of the Ottoman Empire
