= Economy of the Nguyễn dynasty until 1884 =

Economic period in Vietnam

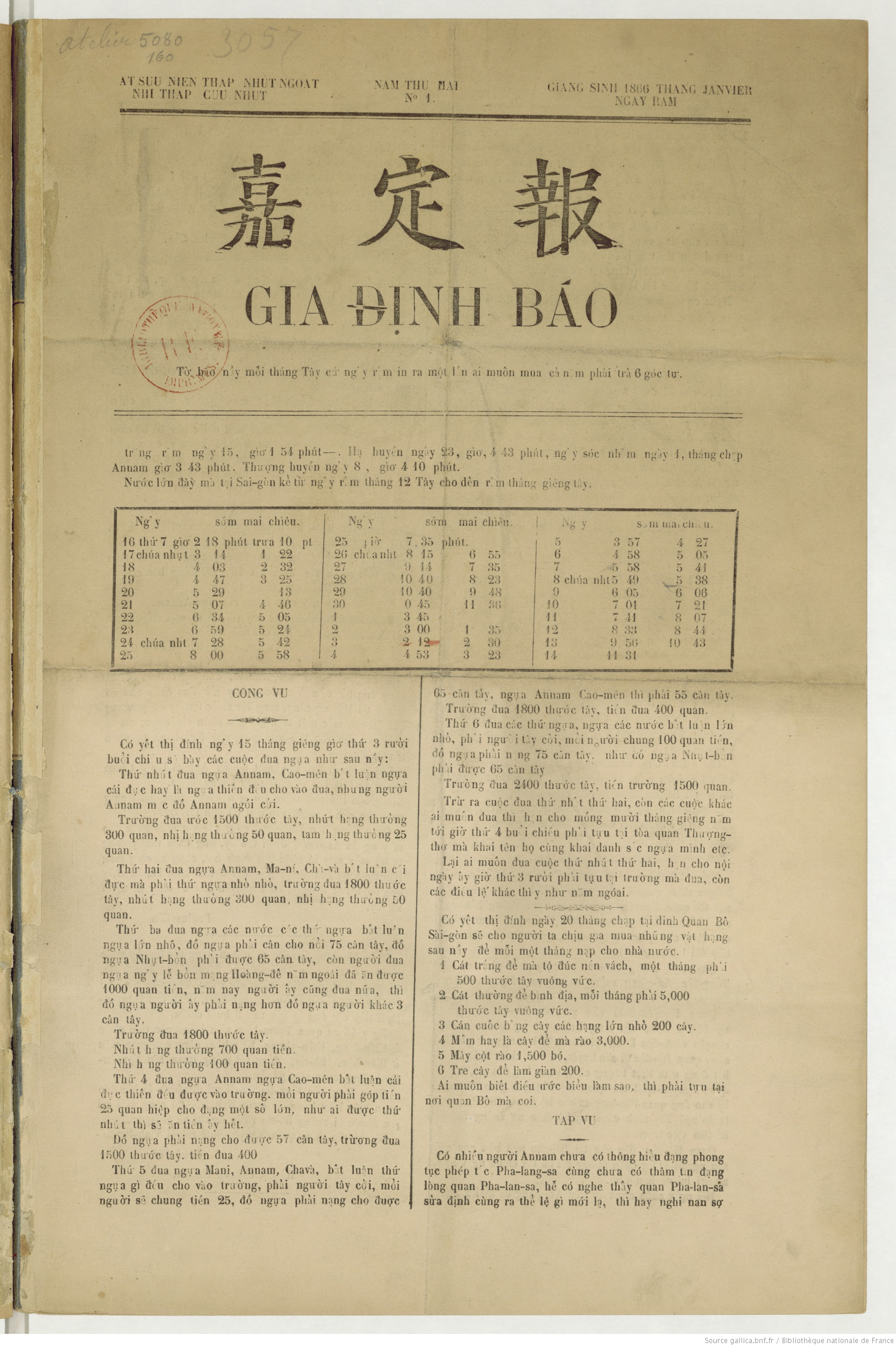
Gia Định Báo (1865)-the first Vietnamese magazine and newspaper, issued in French Cochinchina.

The economy of the nineteenth-century period of the Nguyễn dynasty was primarily agricultural. Ninety-five percent of the national economy depended on agriculture. Fragile Mining and handicraft were the only industry sectors in the country before the 1870s. International trade and business were heavily restricted by the Confucian-minded bureaucratic state. Contact with the outside world and modernisation efforts were kept constraining.

== Agriculture ==
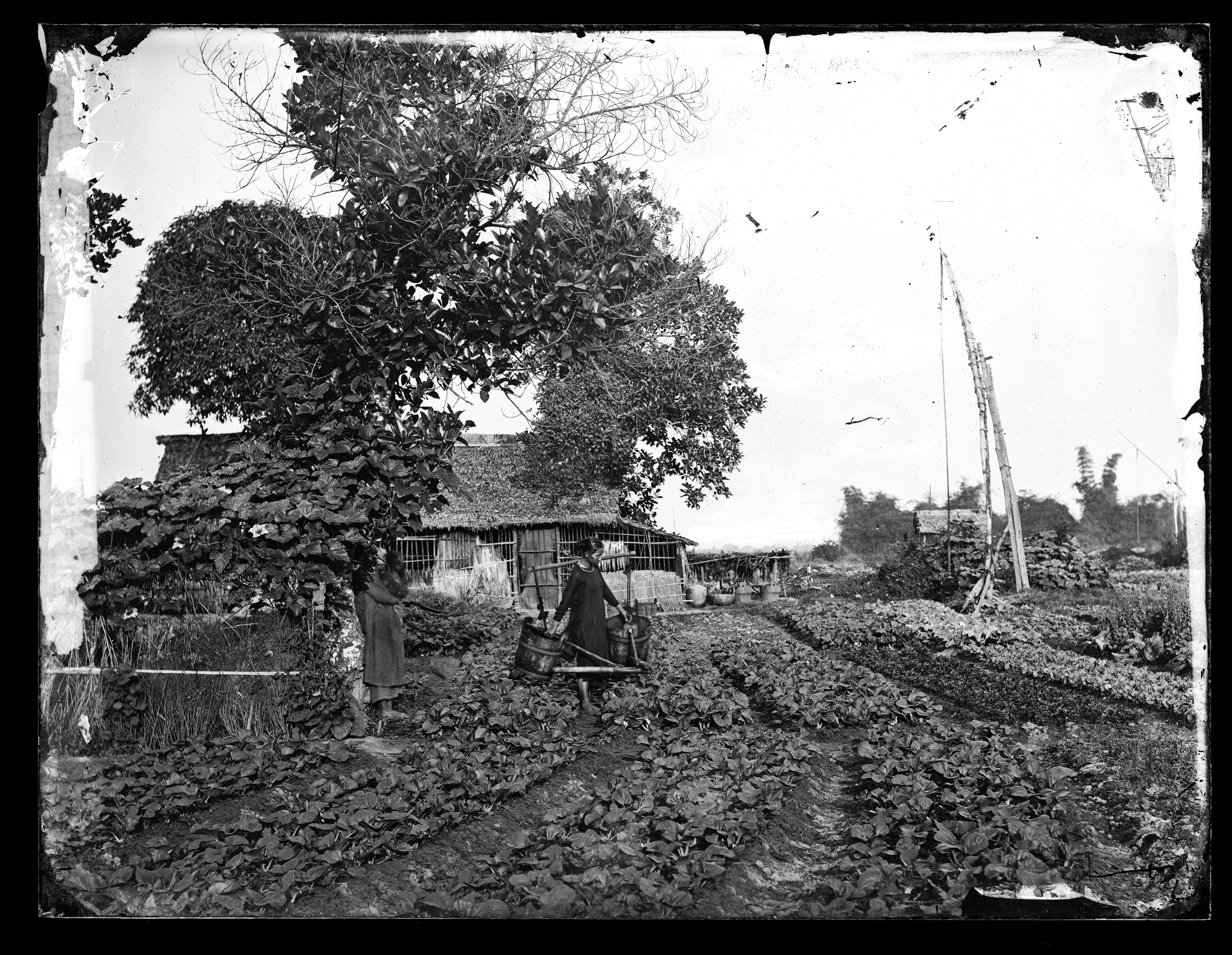
Peasants on vegetable field - photograph by John Thomson, 1867.

Rice was the most important grain. Rich peasant landlords (địa chủ) privately owned much of the farmlands. Landless peasantry tenants (tá điền) had to lend the landlord's farms and work on their fields as labours. The tenants regularly paid ground rent to their landlords after each harvest. Estimated about 70 to 80 percent of the 1840s Vietnamese countryside adult population were tenant peasants. In some villages in Northern and Central Vietnam, communal-land ownership was practiced and lands were shared among the villagers. During a year, fields could have two harvests with paying taxes to the government: summer fields (hạ điền), which began in the winter and harvested in the summer; autumn fields (thu điền), began in summer and ended in autumn; summer-autumn fields (hạ thu điền); dry fields (hán điền), depended on each region's climates.

Dikes and canals were rebuilt and checked every year to protect the crops from Vietnam's extremely harsh climates, with constant floods and typhoons that could destroy them. Beside the main crops rice, sweet potatoes, vegetables and beans, Vietnamese agricultural products were considerable abundant: salt, sugar, tea, silks, cotton, tobaccos, poultry, meat, fishes, bird nests, and various spices. Annually, rice productions were shipped to Hue from northern and southern deltas. When the French seized the river gate of the north in late 1873, the amount of rice transported to the capital had been dropped, prompted Tu Duc to negotiate and accept French's terms. Coffee tree during early 19th century was almost exclusively planted within the royal garden and other small gardens in Saigon, and just a few hundred pounds of coffee beans were produced each year. By the late of the century, Đồn điền (military settlement) in the highlands were transformed into coffee and rubber plantations by French investors. In Southern Vietnam, total cultivating lands amounted to 1.546 million acres and rice occupied 1.305 million acres. European migrants were given 300 acres of land for free and 752 by sale.

Natural disasters such as typhoons, drought, floods and famines were frequent. Severe famines struck north-central Vietnam in 1823–24, the Red River Delta in 1827, central Vietnam in 1835 and 1840, northern Vietnam in 1841. Dams and river dikes were neglected by the court by 1870s. Cholera epidemics affected national-wide famines occurred in 1806, 1820, late 1840s and 1860–70s. Locusts plagued provinces of Son Tay and Bac Ninh in 1854. 200,000 people died during the plague of 1820, and around 800,000–1,000,000 perished in the cholera outbreak of 1847–1849.

== Industry ==
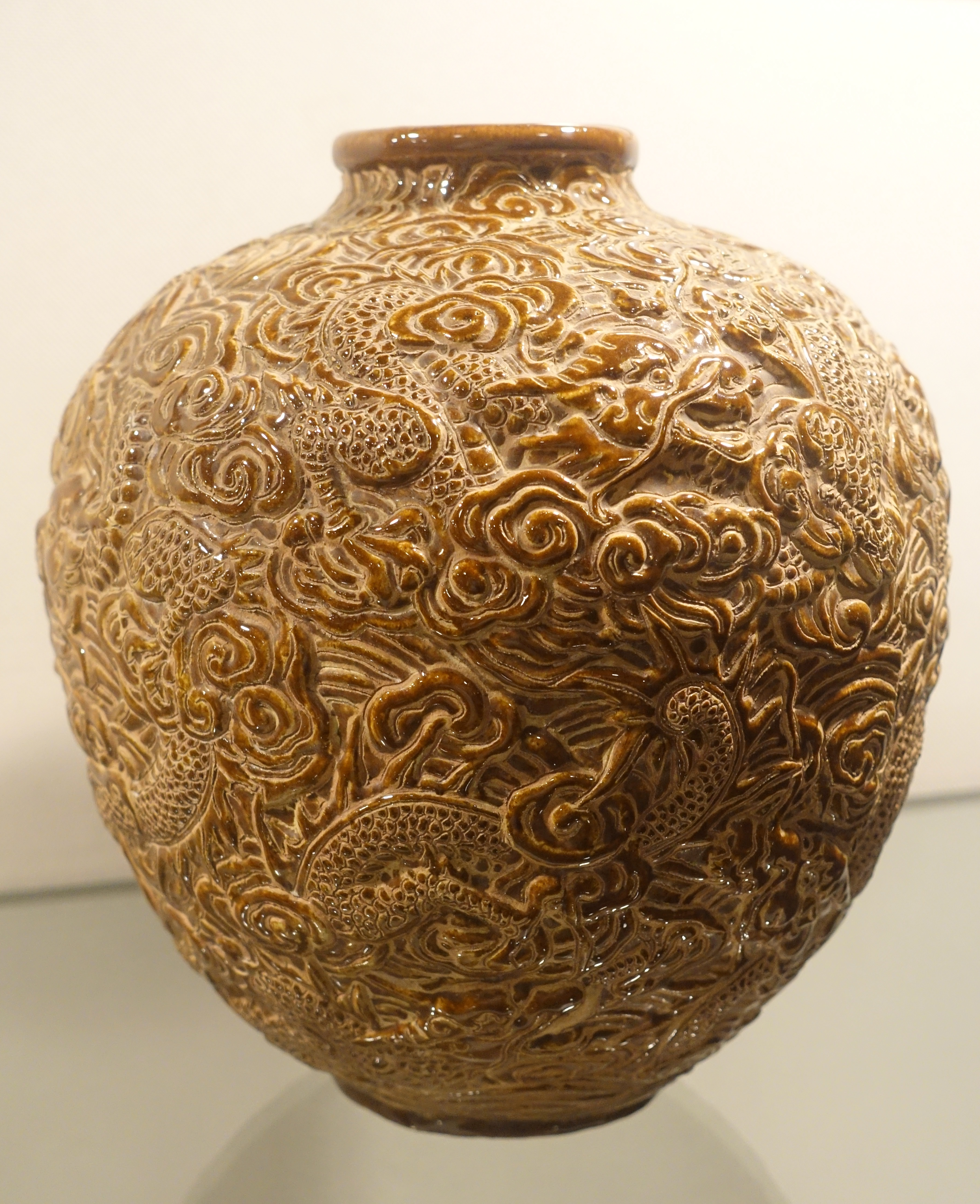
Porcelain jar manufactured by the 19th century kilns of Bien Hoa, Southern Vietnam.

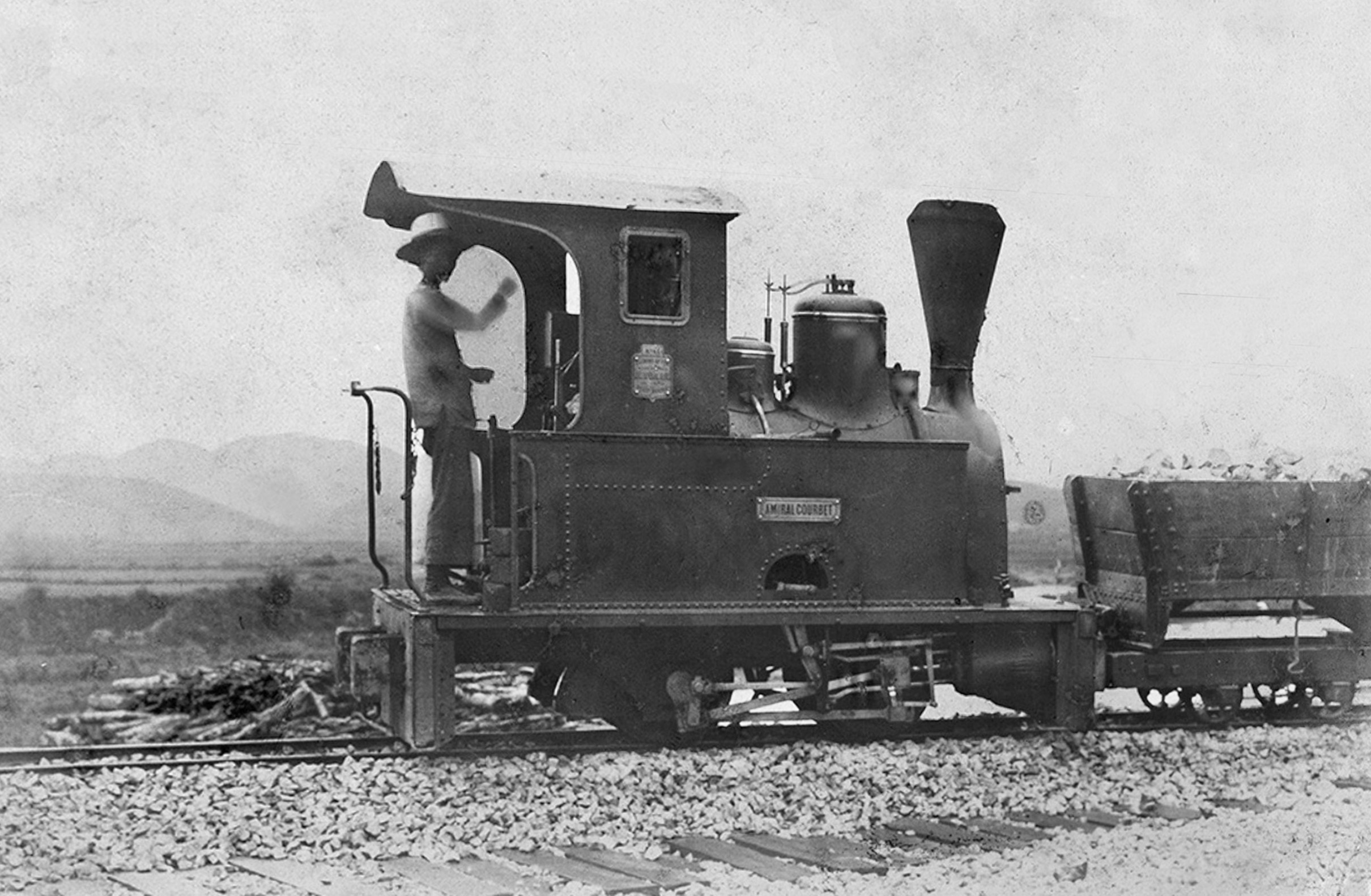
Worker on the constructing Phủ Lạng Thương-Lạng Sơn line, 1880.

The Red River Delta and its adjacent mountains were rich in minerals. From 1802 to 1858, over 124 mines of gold, silver, copper, zinc, iron, lead, sulfur, and coal in northern Vietnam were operated.

The handicraft industry on the other hand was mostly dominated by families, but there were also free workers such as carpenters and bricklayers, which organized into a small company or factory, manufactured porcelains, glasses, metal items domestically. The head of each worker's organization was a skillful worker (thợ cả) who represented them, deciding wages and work. In towns and cities, Vietnamese labours and artisans associated themselves with companies (ty) and wards (phường), which functioned as a labour union. Every year, the workers met once or twice to elect a leader and perform rites to the company's founders.

19th-century Vietnamese labour forces were never thrived to the phase of industrialization, due to the harsh constraining of the court, low productivity, the strong-affected aspects of traditional village agricultural economy, and the difficulty in competing with ethnic Chinese owned-companies who dominated Vietnamese commerce. In a report, within the month of June 1826, Saigon blacksmiths produced 80 tons of pig iron, 10 tons of cast iron, and 16 tons of crucible steel.

French investors reconstructed the infrastructures in Saigon and Cholon. Tramline connecting two cities and the first railway connecting Saigon-My Tho was opened in 1881.

== Commerce ==
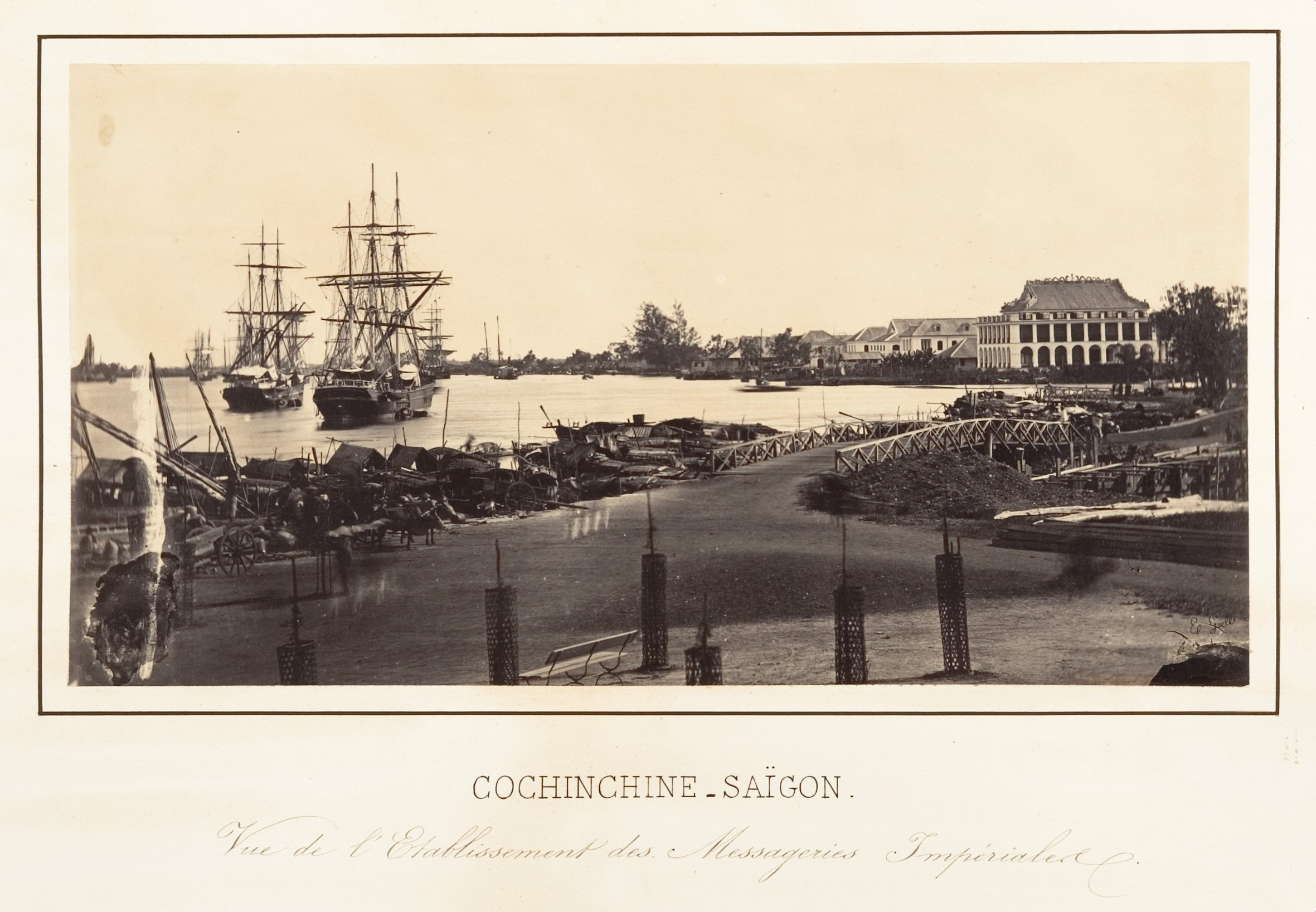
Merchant ships arrive the dock of French Saigon - 1866.

Ships were the backbone of the Vietnamese economy, goods had to be transported by sea and river rather than land routes due to the country's terrain disadvantage. A Vietnamese cargo ship that arrived in Macau in 1837 was reported: "weighing 400 tons, being 90 feet long and 20 feet wide." In 1845 and 1846, five royal cargo ships with a total tonnage of 2,400 tons arrived Singapore, according to a British report. The Singapore Chronicle recorded that on each Vietnamese ship, there were 80 sailors and 10 officers, under two captains who control the ship and the cargo.

Like in other countries in Southeast Asia, the Vietnamese commerce economy was dominated by oversea Chinese merchants. Chinese merchants who belonged to the thanh nhan (Qingmen) class thus sold Vietnamese rice and smuggled opium back to Vietnam. Emperor Minh Mang in 1827 issued an edict that prohibited the thanh nhan Chinese to engage rice trading and participate in the government bureaucracy, unless if they had changed their identities to minh huong, according to Minh Mang's assimilating policies on ethnic minorities.

The main exports of the Kingdom of Vietnam came from agricultural products such as rice, salt, sugar, silks. Minh Mạng's view on trade was "unnecessary for his self-sufficient economy" and once considered "trade was merely a favour conferred upon deserving barbarians." However, Vietnamese state-owned ships frequently sailed to Singapore, Macao, Luzon, and Bengal to trade. Vietnamese annual rice exports to British Singapore had jumped from $147 million in 1821 to $2 billion in 1865. The decrease of the latter value was caused by the French seizure of the lower Mekong, failed crops, and rapid population growth. Trade with Britain was also under state control, and trading ships were ships of the Emperor. The kingdom's main imports were manufactured goods, opium, and tea. Opium during 1840–44 counted for 59% value of total imports of Vietnam, while cotton made up 22%. Opium consumption and exports in the Mekong Delta generated 500,000 francs in 1862 to 6.7 million francs in 1881, which became the main revenue for the new French administration. Commerce in French Saigon reached $21 million US Dollar in 1882, with China and British Singapore being largest exporters ($3.2 and $3.1 million). In the port of Saigon, France accounted for 6 sailing ships and 31 steamers, Britain held 11 sailing ships, 208 steamers, and Germany owned 62 steamers. Hanoi was the busy trading city in the north. After the treaty of 1874, port cities of Haiphong and Quy Nhon were opened for trade with the world. According to Mongolian-born Australian historian Li Tana, 19th-century Vietnamese commerce by the time of the French conquest, had been linking with the global economy.
