= Lạng Sơn =

Lạng Sơn may refer to:

- Lạng Sơn province, a border province in northern Vietnam
- Lạng Sơn (city), former provincial city of Lạng Sơn province
