= Father Chapdelaine Incident =

Incident in Xilin, Guangxi

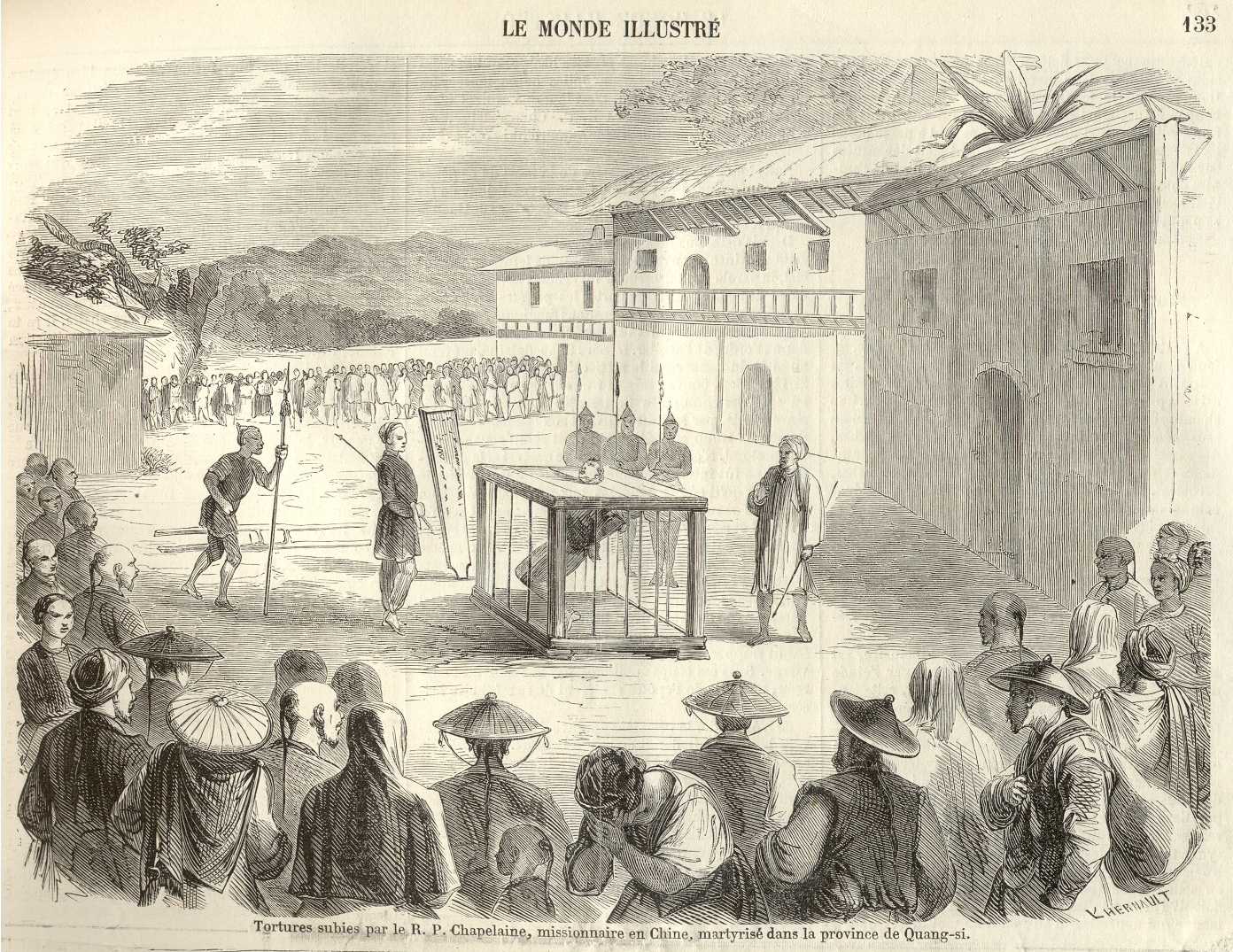
- Native name: 广西西林教案
- Date: February 25–29, 1856
- Location: Ding'an Town, Tianlin County, Guangxi, China
- Also known as: Auguste Chapdelaine Incident
- Cause: Religion conflict
- Target: Auguste Chapdelaine
- Outcome: Second Opium War
- Deaths: 3 (Auguste Chapdelaine, Bai Xiaoman and Agnes Tsao Kou Ying)
- Convicted: 26?

The Father Chapdelaine Incident (Chinese: 马神甫事件; pinyin: Mǎ shénfǔ shìjiàn), also called the Xilin Incident (Chinese: 西林教案; pinyin: Xīlín jiào'àn), occurring in 1856 during the Taiping Rebellion, was a mid-19th-century diplomatic and religious crisis in Qing-dynasty China. It concerned the arrest, trial, and death of a catholic missionary of Paris Foreign Missions Society and his followers in Xilin County, Guangxi, which escalated into international tension and contributed to the outbreak of the Second Opium War.

== Background ==
This incident was rooted in a complex interplay of religious, political, and economic factors, influenced by both domestic discontent and foreign interventions.

=== Foreign Interest ===
Western powers often sought cooperation with Christian missions as part of their broader strategies to expand influence in China. Missionaries provided cultural and linguistic expertise that facilitated diplomatic and commercial exchanges, while their presence also served to legitimize foreign intervention under the guise of religious freedom. Furthermore, Christianity was viewed as a tool to promote Western values and social reforms, which could open Chinese society to trade and political penetration. By aligning with missions, Western governments aimed not only to secure economic privileges through unequal treaties but also to establish a moral justification for their expanding presence in China.

=== Christian Activities ===
The unequal treaties gave European powers jurisdiction over missions in China and some authority over Chinese Christians. The treaty ports served as bases for foreign missionaries. If foreign missionaries entered the Chinese interior, the unequal treaties required them to be brought back to the treaty ports and delivered to the civil authorities of their nation. Typically, the foreign civil authorities would release the missionary and not impose a penalty.

Privileges obtained by France through the Treaty of Huangpu enabled it to establish its religious protectorate in China over Catholics. French minister Marie Melchior Joseph Théodose de Lagrené viewed the negotiation of the treaty as an opportunity to improve the prestige of France and the Catholic Church through religious policy, in addition to obtaining economic benefits. The treaty institutionalised benefits for French Catholics, including the ability to operate and establish religious institutions in the treaty ports, decriminalisation of Catholicism throughout China, and providing that any missionaries discovered by Chinese authorities outside the treaty ports should be escorted to a French consulate. De Lagrené further negotiated an edict which the Daoguang Emperor issued in 1846 which reaffirmed the free exercise of Catholic religious practice, mandated punishment for Chinese officials who persecuted Catholics, and restored to local Catholics all church property seized since the Kangxi Emperor's ban on Christianity in the early 18th century.

Many missionaries, including Auguste Chapdelaine, ventured into the interior to spread Christianity, often facing legal and cultural challenges.

=== Religious Tensions ===
During the Christian missionary movement in China, cultural conflicts emerged in several key areas. First, disputes arose over ancestor worship and Confucian rites, which missionaries considered idolatrous but were deeply embedded in Chinese social and moral life. Second, linguistic and conceptual differences created misunderstandings in translating theological ideas, often leading to resistance or misinterpretation. Third, the association of Christianity with Western political powers during the 19th century heightened suspicions that missionaries were agents of cultural imperialism, sparking anti-Christian movements and violent clashes.

Besides, the Taiping Rebellion was partly influenced by internal discontent and foreign intervention during the First Opium War. This Christian-inspired movement led to widespread suspicion of Christianity among Qing officials, who associated foreign missionaries with the rebellion. Consequently, missionaries were often viewed with distrust, and their activities were seen as subversive.

These tensions reflected the difficulty of reconciling universalist Christian doctrines with the long-standing traditions and hierarchical structures of Chinese society.

== Incident ==
=== Early Period ===
In 1852, while the Taiping Army's main forces were shifting toward the Yangtze River basin, Bishop Napoléon Libois of the Diocese of Guangdong and Guangxi dispatched missionary Reniu to secretly enter Guangxi. His mission was to investigate local society and religious activities. It is said that within months, he submitted a detailed and actionable report to the bishop. That same year, Bishop Libois secretly dispatched Father Chapdelaine to China for missionary work. Departing from Hong Kong, he was robbed on the Dongjiang River and turned back. He set out again in early 1853, traveling through Guangdong and Hunan into Guizhou, where he began learning the local dialect and adapting to life in China.

To enhance missionary appeal in inland China, Father Chapdelaine addressed the mountain regions' lack of medical care and the people's hardships. He distributed inexpensive medicines he carried—such as quinine pills for chills, eye drops, and painkillers—free of charge to patients, curing some illnesses. At that time, villagers believed in spirits and deities. When someone fell ill, they would consult shamans and fortune-tellers, often paying them with money and gifts—a heavy burden. In contrast, embracing Catholicism meant receiving medicine when sick without financial cost. Some villagers were thus persuaded by Chapdelaine to be baptized and join the faith.

During his time in Guizhou, Father Chapdelaine met two lay assistants: Bai Xiaoman and Cao Guiying. Bai Xiaoman, a native of Guizhou from a poor family, gained Father Chapdelaine's favor after converting and accompanied him to Guangxi for missionary work. Cao Guiying also came from extreme poverty, and her ancestors had already embraced the faith. Highly intelligent, she earned the priest's attention and was sent to study at the Xingyi Prefecture Church in Guizhou. She married at the age of twenty-nine but experienced discord with her husband's family. After her husband's death, she was expelled from her in-laws' home by her brother and sister-in-law. From then on, she actively engaged in Catholic missionary work. Later, she also accompanied Father Chapdelaine to Guangxi for missionary work.

In December 1853, accompanied by Bai Xiaoman, Cao Guiying, and servant Yalaowu, Father Chapdelaine disguised himself as a local Yi ethnic member. He entered Longlin County, Guangxi from Ma'anshan, Xingyi, Guizhou, then crossed the Tuoniang River into Xilin County. Subsequently, he operated in Baijia and Changjing, thirty li outside Ding'an Town in Xilin County. By distributing medicine and exploiting ethnic tensions, Chapdelaine successfully established Catholic missionary bases in villages like Liujia and Changjing. Subsequently, his activities gradually expanded toward the county seat and surrounding rural areas.

However, during his missionary work, Chapdelaine failed to show sufficient respect for the traditional culture of Xilin County or China as a whole. He forbade his followers from erecting memorial tablets or worshipping ancestors, and strictly prohibited intermarriage between believers and non-believers. Yet, the marriage customs in Ding'an Town emphasized freedom of marriage, and women were considered sacred and inviolable. Over time, Chapdelaine's disregard for local customs and his Confucian-influenced missionary methods sparked intense resentment among the populace, sowing the seeds of future conflict for his continued missionary work.

Chapdelaine also employed various means to seize peasants' fields and forests, and confiscate the property of widows and orphans. To expand his influence, he recruited a group of local thugs and hoodlums into the faith, shielding and encouraging them to commit crimes. Oral accounts from local residents also circulate, detailing Chapdelaine's egregious conduct. Though potentially exaggerated, these accounts reveal how deeply despised Chapdelaine had become among the locals:

Converts were forbidden from setting up altars or incense burners in their homes, and were not allowed to burn incense. They cannot sweep tombs during the Double Third Festival and the Qingming Festival, nor honor their ancestors. Only in September would they clear the grass from their ancestral graves... The priest summoned mostly women for baptism, though sometimes men too... During the ceremony, he ordered the baptized into a darkened room—no lights allowed, no shouting permitted—where he taught them prayers... Some claimed that after baptizing women, the priest kept them confined in the church for two or three days before releasing them home. After Father Chapdelaine arrived (in Xilin), one or two children aged eight or nine soon went missing, rumored to have been taken by Father Ma for slaughter... Father Ma seized our farmland and insulted women, earning the people's deep hatred. The county magistrate declared China forbade his missionary work, yet Father Ma persisted.

=== Begin ===
In 1855, Father Chapdelaine demanded that Bai San, a believer from Baijiazhai, convert his wife to Catholicism. He also sternly ordered Bai San to remove the ancestral tablets from his home. Facing fierce opposition from his wife and relatives, Bai San sought to renounce his faith. Father Chapdelaine rebuked him for lacking resolve. Later, through Cao Guiying, Chapdelaine deceived Bai San's daughter and niece into converting. Bai San's niece, humiliated by Chapdelaine during her baptism, took her own life in tears. Bai San reported Chapdelaine and his associates to the Xilin County Magistrate's Office over this incident. Just as Chapdelaine prepared to travel to the provincial capital Guilin, Chinese authorities discovered and arrested him. County Magistrate Huang Deming, who had long accepted Chapdelaine's bribes and was mindful of the provisions in the Treaty of Whampoa while also intimidated by Western military force, imposed no punishment and deported him back to Hong Kong. However, Chapdelaine returned to Xilin on December 25th of that year.

=== Course ===
Upon learning of Chapdelaine's return, Bai San reported the matter once more to the Xilin County Magistrate's Office. By this time, Zhang Mingfeng had succeeded as magistrate. On February 25, 1856, he arrested Chapdelaine and 26 other believers (sources vary between 14, 24, and 25 individuals) on charges of preaching beyond their designated boundaries. The church was sealed, and nearly 400 items—including church furnishings, liturgical vessels, priestly and nun's vestments, and Chinese or French scriptures—were confiscated. Chapdelaine was accused of spreading heresy and plotting rebellion. After Chapdelaine and others were arrested, Zhang Mingfeng initially planned to interrogate them secretly, record their confessions, and then expel them. However, upon hearing this, Bai San and others jointly posted "white-headed notices" on Ding'an Street, publicly exposing Chapdelaine's alleged crimes and pressuring Zhang Mingfeng to hold a public trial for the case. Upon hearing this, crowds gathered before the magistrate's office. Women who had been insulted by Chapdelaine and followers who had been forced to destroy their ancestral altars after joining the sect began to file complaints against him.

Unlike his predecessor Magistrate Huang Deming, Zhang Mingfeng was deeply repulsed by Chapdelaine's alleged actions and resolved to conduct a trial, severely reprimand him, and punish Chapdelaine and his associates according to the law. There is also a claim that Chapdelaine refused to bribe the magistrate, who, in a fit of spite, responded by imposing a harsher punishment.

On February 26th, the Xilin County Magistrate's Office convened a trial for Father Chapdelaine and his associates. Crowds gathered at the courthouse to observe, and the proceedings lasted three consecutive days. Many citizens came forward to accuse Chapdelaine, but he consistently denied all charges, berated Magistrate Zhang Mingfeng for oppressing Catholic missionary activities, claiming it violated the Sino-French treaty.

On February 29, after three days of trial, Chapdelaine remained unwilling to submit to Qing authority. Faced with intense public sentiment, Zhang Mingfeng sentenced Chapdelaine to death. Enraged crowds paraded his decapitated body through the streets. Some accounts claim Chapdelaine was not executed by Zhang Mingfeng but dragged by locals near Ding'an to a riverbank boulder pile where he was beaten to death. A group of local Catholics, including Cao Guiying and Bai Xiaoman, were subjected to Cangue. Bai Xiaoman was executed on February 25, while Cao Guiying's execution occurred on March 1.

=== Result ===
In July 1856, upon learning of Father Chapdelaine's execution, Bishop Philippe François Zéphirin Guillemin, Apostolic Vicar of the Vicariate Apostolic of Guangdong and Guangxi, notified the French Legation and initiated negotiations with the Qing government. The Second French Empire began demonstrating its displeasure to the Qing authorities, asserting that the magistrate of Xilin County had violated the provisions of the Treaty of Whampoa by executing Chapdelaine and imposing the death penalty through cruel methods. They thus strongly demanded the Qing government dismiss Zhang Mingfeng from office and bar him from holding any official position ever again.

However, in 1857, Ye Mingchen, the Viceroy of Liangguang, submitted a memorial to the central government. In it, he stated that the magistrate of Xilin County claimed no priest named Chapdelaine had been executed in Xilin. Instead, the executed individual was a bandit named "Ma Zinong".

== After ==
After negotiations with the Qing government failed, France raised the slogan "Fighting to Protect Catholicism". After the British Empire started the Second Opium War in October 1856, French forces joined the British in forming an allied expeditionary force in 1857 to carry out military retaliation—this became known as the British-French Allied Forces.

In June 1858, the Qing government signed the Treaty of Tientsin with France. The treaty stipulated that "Catholic missionaries may freely preach in the interior" and guaranteed the basic personal safety of missionaries. France further added six supplementary clauses to the Draft Sino-French Treaty. The first clause stipulated: Zhang Mingfeng, Magistrate of Xilin County, who dared to arbitrarily kill Father Chapdelaine, a missionary of our nation, is guilty of a crime. He shall be dismissed from his post, and it is declared that he shall not be permitted to hold any official position hereafter. Subsequently, Zhang Mingfeng was dismissed from office. However, after the furor over the Xilin Incident subsided, he was reinstated.

In 1859, the British-French allied forces invaded again. Emperor Xianfeng once more issued an edict prohibiting missionary activities. Amidst renewed anti-foreign sentiment, numerous missionaries were killed.

On October 25, 1860, China and France signed the Convention of Peking. Article VI stipulated:

... All military and civilian personnel shall be permitted to practice Catholicism, gather for sermons, and construct churches for worship. Those who arbitrarily arrest such individuals shall be subject to appropriate punishment. Furthermore, all Catholic churches, schools, cemeteries, lands, and buildings confiscated during the previous persecution of Catholics shall be returned with compensation...

Thereafter, Catholic missionary activities in the Qing Dynasty were no longer prohibited.

== Influence ==
Following this Incident, the Qing Dynasty was fully opened to western missionary activities. However, the clash between traditional Chinese culture and Christian culture remained inevitable, and the conflict between them was not resolved. This is evident in the 1860 massacre of Ding'an Town by Taiping Heavenly Kingdom forces and the subsequent Boxer Rebellion. In fact, after the implementation of the Convention of Peking, foreign missionaries gained unrestricted access to the interior, leading to a significant increase in missionary numbers and a corresponding rise in missionary incidents. Zeng Guofan thus wrote in his memorial:

Whenever a Catholic commits a crime, priests shield their co-religionists regardless of guilt or innocence; consuls likewise shield missionaries regardless of right or wrong. In disputes between Chinese and Catholics, commoners invariably suffer injustice while Catholics invariably prevail. As Catholic arrogance grows, so does the resentment of the common people. When resentment reaches its peak, it erupts—then they gather in crowds, united in their desire for vengeance.

Father Chapdelaine was beatified in 1900. Subsequently, both Father Chapdelaine and Cao Guiying were canonized by Pope John Paul II on October 1, 2000.

On July 8, 1994, the Xilin Incident Site, now located in Ding'an Town, Tianlin County, was designated as a National priority protected site in the eighth batch.

== Controversy ==
=== The Cause of Chapdelaine's Death ===
The prevailing academic consensus holds that Chapdelaine was arrested and executed on the orders of Zhang Mingfeng. However, Huang Jiaxin employs extensive historical documentation to argue that Chapdelaine was not executed by Zhang, but rather subjected to mob justice by local populace near Ding'an Town.

Wang Wenjuan contends that Chapdelaine was arrested and killed by Zhang Mingfeng in accordance with the wishes of both the ruling class and the local populace. The fundamental reason for Chapdelaine's death was that, during the highly sensitive period of the Taiping Rebellion, he had illegally penetrated the sensitive core region of Guangxi to conduct missionary work. This led local officials to believe he intended to enter Guangxi to organise a rebellion. The immediate trigger was conflict arising from cultural differences during his missionary work, which fostered profound distrust of Catholicism among the populace. This hostility was evident during the massacre of Ding'an Town by Taiping forces.

=== Chapdelaine Himself ===
Chinese publications predominantly portray Chapdelaine as a villain of many misdeeds. However, local investigations reveal some believers regarded him as a good man. Two versions of the "Real and Fake Chapdelaine" tale emerged locally: the populace believed there were two Chapdelaines—the genuine one being virtuous, the other wicked. One version holds that the genuine Chapdelaine was replaced by the wicked counterfeit while en route to Xilin County. Another suggests the county magistrate dispatched the counterfeit Chapdelaine to commit atrocities, deliberately framing the genuine Chapdelaine as a villain.

Wang Wenjuan contends that both versions of Chapdelaine are fabricated constructs. The depraved Chapdelaine was a persona created by the Qing government, motivated by considerations of ruling stability, to justify suppressing the spread of Catholicism. The virtuous Chapdelaine, conversely, was fabricated by local officials and gentry to conceal this incident. They invented the "bandit Ma Zinong" narrative to demonstrate their own lack of ill will towards Chapdelaine. The true Chapdelaine likely occupied a middle ground: not as utterly depraved as portrayed by the Qing government, yet nonetheless embroiled in numerous conflicts and disputes with the local populace.

== See also ==
- Catholic Church in China
- Chinese Martyrs
- Chinese Rites controversy
