= Anti-missionary riots in China =

Starting with the arrival in China of the Jesuit China missions in 1552, the number of Western missionaries increased gradually. The Treaty of Tientsin in 1858 gave the Christians free run in the country and the right to purchase land to build. The Western missionaries saw themselves as the godsent preachers while Chinese saw them as the barbarians (Chinese: 夷), the extension of foreign invasion, shielded by treaties and backed by their governments' gunboats. Anti missionary riots became part of the landscape, culminating in the Boxer Rebellion in 1900.

== List of anti-missionary riots ==
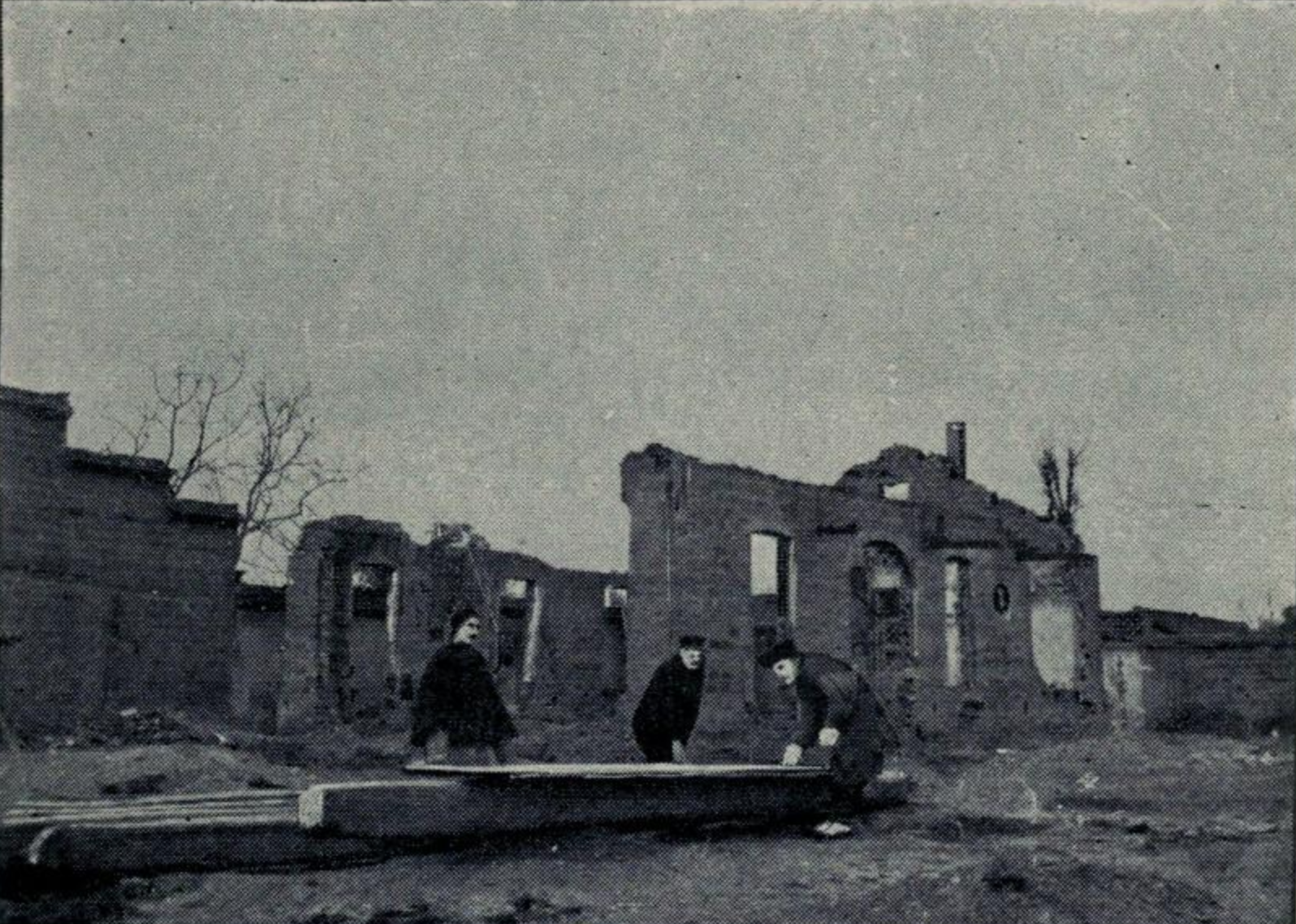
Ruins of a Canadian Methodist missionary George Everson Hartwell's house after the 1895 anti-missionary riots in Chengdu, Sichuan.

- February 1856, The Father Chapdelaine Incident (西林教案), Guangxi Province
- 29 August 1865, Youyang anti-missionary riot, Sichuan Province
- August 1868, Yangzhou riot, Jiangsu Province
- June 1870, Tianjin Massacre, Zhili Province
- 1871, Anti-Missionary Movement, southern China
- 30 August 1878, Foochow anti-missionary riot, Fujian Province
- 1886, Chongqing anti-missionary riot (traditional Chinese: 重慶教案; simplified Chinese: 重庆教案), Sichuan Province
- May 1891, Anti-missionary riots in Wuhu, Anhui Province
- May 1895, Chengdu anti-missionary riot (成都教案), Sichuan Province
- 1 August 1895, Kucheng massacre, Fujian Province
- April 1897, The Leli Incident (乐里教案), Guangxi Province
- Nov 1897, The Juye Incident (曹州教案 or 巨野教案), Shandong Province
- 1899–1901, Boxer Rebellion, multiple locations
