= Leli Incident =

- The deceased Frédéric Mazel
- Location: Loly, Lingyun County, Sicheng Prefecture, Guangxi Province, Qing China
- Date: 1 April 1897; 4:00 a.m.
- Deaths: 2
- Perpetrator: You Weihan

The Leli Incident (Chinese: 乐里教案) was a diplomatic and civil unrest incident triggered by the killing of Frédéric Mazel (Chinese: 馬仙), a French Catholic missionary traveling through Loly (present-day Leli Town, Tianlin County, Guangxi), on the night of 31 March 1897. The perpetrator, You Weihan (Chinese: 游维翰), was a member of the Tiandihui who had participated in the Sino-French War. Motivated by resentment over the war and a desire to seize money and valuables, You killed the missionary and another Chinese Catholic clergyman. The incident subsequently led to diplomatic demands and armed unrest.

== Background ==
During the Sino-French War, Guangxi organized border residents and military forces to defend the frontier and sent troops into Vietnam. After the war ended, the Qing government incorporated some former Tiandihui members into local militias but disbanded the remaining anti-French fighters without providing them with adequate support. Many were left to disperse across the border regions of Guizhou, Yunnan, and Guangxi, where they became known as roving armed bands.

You Weihan, a member of the Tiandihui, organized a force of more than a thousand men and operated along the borders of Guangxi, Yunnan, and Guizhou. During his movements, he arrived at Loly, established contact with local Tiandihui organizations, and recruited nearby residents to expand his following.

While he was in Loly, Tiandihui members and local residents told him that the Catholic church engaged in usurious lending and that its members lured naive women into the faith and used religious conversion as a pretext for sexual misconduct. Having witnessed atrocities committed by French troops during the Sino-French War, as well as the involvement of French Catholic missionaries in the invasion, You became deeply resentful. He reportedly declared, "Whenever I see a French priest, no matter how important he is, I will kill him."

== The incident ==
On 22 March 1897, Frédéric Mazel, a missionary of the Paris Foreign Missions Society, traveled from Baise to Loly and stayed at the local church. He was accompanied by two local clergymen, Wei Yasheng and Lu, who had been sent by the Changjing church to Baise to escort him.

Members of the local Tiandihui informed You Weihan, who was stationed at Hekou and Pingwang, about Mazel's presence. Believing that Mazel carried medicines and money, You decided to lead an armed force to the church to seize these possessions.

During his stay in Loly, Mazel and his companions also faced hostility from local residents. Some argued that, because they were French, they should pay for the territory France had taken from Guangxi during the war. Mazel and his companions sought assistance from local Green Standard Army troops, but their request received no response.

On the night of 31 March, You Weihan personally led an armed group from Hekou toward the church in Loly. More than ten members of his force arrived in the town after midnight. Disguised as porters working for the church, they entered the premises.

According to one account, Mazel fired a gun from his bedroom in an attempt to stop them and wounded one of You's men, prompting You to order his men to return fire. Another account states that the attackers forcibly broke open the doors, ransacked the church, and fired several shots into the bedroom. Mazel and one accompanying Chinese Catholic clergyman were killed by gunfire, while another escaped.

== Suppression and punishment ==
On 1 April 1897, the Catholic diocese of Guangxi asked the French consulate in Longzhou to demand that the Qing government apprehend the perpetrators and pay compensation. The Qing government telegraphed Guangxi Governor Shi Nianzu, instructing him to take charge of the matter.

Shi dispatched troops under Su Yuanchun, Ma Shengzhi, and Lu Rongting, together with Sicheng Prefecture prefect Wang Tian and Lingyun County magistrate Chen Fenglou, to suppress You Weihan's forces in the areas around Lucheng and Loly.

You's forces engaged the Qing troops in fierce fighting and repelled several attacks. You was eventually wounded at Baipiao and fled first through Lizhou to Donglan, then to Fuping in Enyang County. At the end of May, local militia captured him and bound him. He was first taken to his native Longzhou for identification and then transferred to Lucheng for interrogation.

On 19 August 1897, the 20th day of the seventh lunar month, You Weihan was taken to Loly and executed.

== Aftermath ==
The armed unrest involving Tiandihui groups along the borders of Guangxi, Yunnan, and Guizhou continued after You Weihan's execution. The insurgents used Sicheng Prefecture in Guangxi as their base and sent forces into various parts of Yunnan.

The Qing government deployed as many as 44 battalions to reinforce government forces. Outnumbered and outmatched, the Tiandihui insurgents suffered repeated defeats. Li Er, one of the movement's leaders, was captured and killed by Qing troops at Boyai. The remaining forces were compelled to retreat into Guangxi. The six-year armed uprising of secret-society groups along the borders of the three provinces eventually collapsed.

== See also ==
- Sino-French War
- Catholic Church in China
- Xilin Incident
- Chinese Rites Controversy
