= Henri Havret =

French Catholic priest (1848–1902)

- Born: 15 November 1848; Wassy, France
- Died: 29 September 1902 (aged 53); Xujiahui, China
- Occupation: Jesuit Priest

Henri Havret (15 November 1848 – 29 September 1902) was a French Jesuit priest and missionary active in 19th-century China.

== Life and death ==
He was born in Wassy, France on 15 November 1848.

He died in Xujiahui, China in 1901.

== Career ==
He joined the Society of Jesus (Jesuits) in 1872 and was sent to the Kiangnan Mission in China in 1874. In China, he pursued theological studies and became a priest in 1874. He lost his papers in the 1891 anti-missionary riot in Wuhu.

In 1894, he became a director of Xujiahui seminary and held the post until 1898.

== Bibliography ==
He is the author of a number of notable works written in the French language:

- L'île de Tsong-ming à l'embouchure du Yang-tse-kiang. Chang-hai. 1892.
- La province du Ngan-Hoei. Chang-hai: Imprimerie de la Mission Catholique. 1894.
- La stèle chrétienne de Si-Ngan-fou.; three volumes, published 1895-1902, on the Xi'an Stele
- T'ien-tchou, "seigneur du ciel": à propos d'une stèle bouddhique de Tch'eng-tou
- L'ile de Tsong-ming: a l'embouchure du Yang-tse-kiang
- Mélanges sur la chronologie chinoise
