= Second Opium War =

1856–1860 war between British–French forces and China

- Part of the Opium Wars
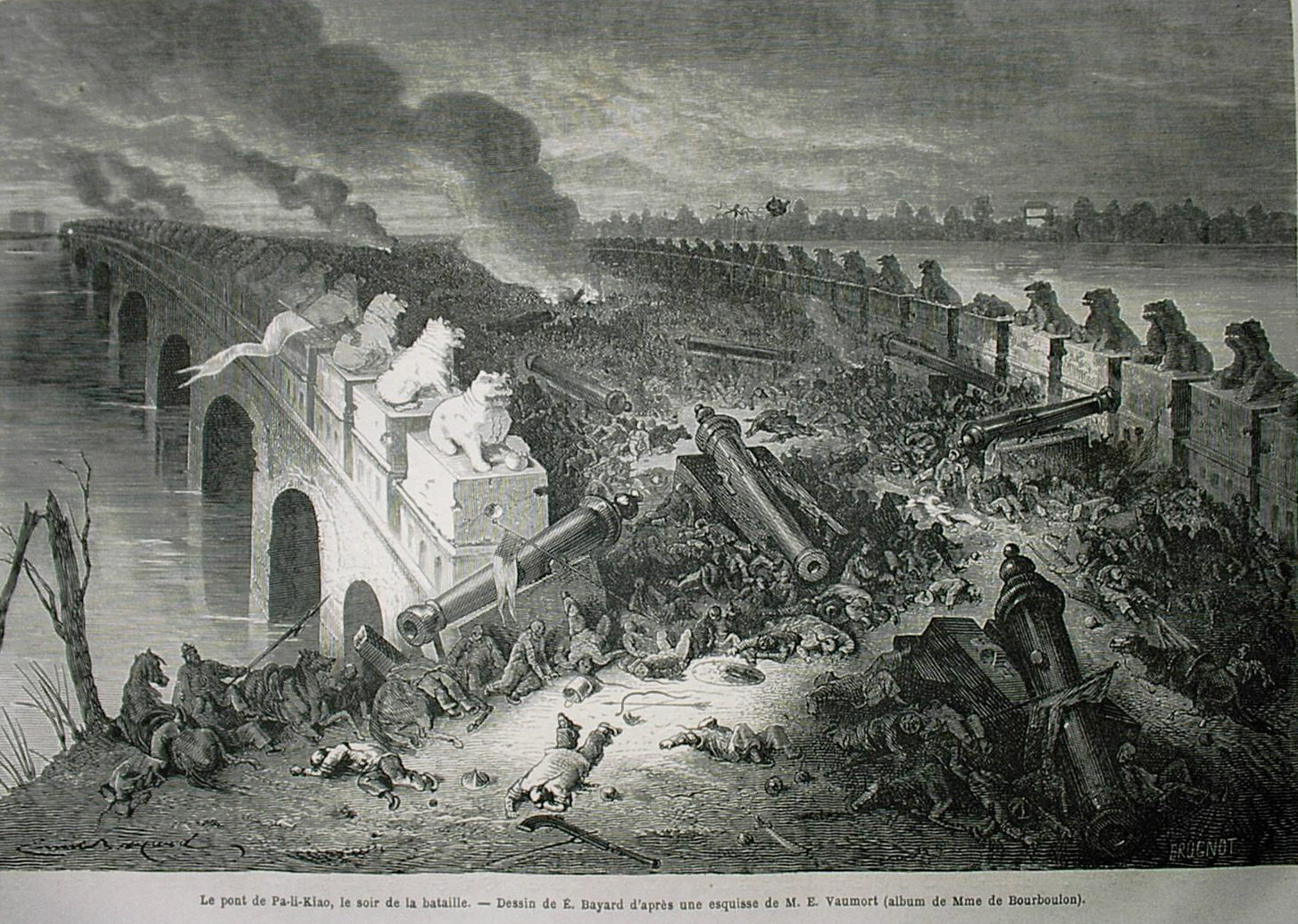
- Palikao's bridge, on the evening of the Battle of Palikao, by Émile Bayard
Date	8 October 1856 – 24 October 1860 (4 years and 16 days)
Location	China
Result	Allied victory (see § Aftermath)
Territorial changes	Kowloon Peninsula and Stonecutters Island ceded to form part of British Hong Kong; Outer Manchuria ceded to Russia

Belligerents
United Kingdom; India; France; Russia; United States	(Qing dynasty) Great Qing

Commanders and leaders
(United Kingdom of Great Britain and Ireland) Queen Victoria; (United Kingdom of Great Britain and Ireland) Henry Temple; (United Kingdom of Great Britain and Ireland) Edward Stanley; Michael Seymour; Charles Straubenzee; James Grant; Napoleon III; Charles Genouilly; Charles Montauban; Andrew Foote; Josiah Tattnall III; Alexander II; Alexander Chernyshyov; Alexey Orlov; Philipp von Brunnow	Xianfeng Emperor (Qing dynasty) Prince Gong (Qing dynasty) Ye Mingchen # (Qing dynasty) Sengge Rinchen (Qing dynasty) Yishan (Qing dynasty) Keying

Strength
13,127; 7,000	7,400 (Eight Banners and Green Standard Army)

Casualties and losses
United Kingdom; 134 killed; 642 wounded; 3 gunboats sunk; 3 gunboats grounded; 1 launch destroyed; 1 gunboat damaged; France; 25+ killed; 146+ wounded; United States; 11 killed; 23 wounded; 2 sloops damaged; 1 launch damaged	2,100–2,801 killed or wounded 2,100 captured 10+ forts captured 736 guns captured 99–109+ ships captured or destroyed

The Second Opium War (simplified Chinese: 第二次鸦片战争; traditional Chinese: 第二次鴉片戰爭), also known as the Second Anglo-Chinese War or Arrow War, was fought between the United Kingdom and France against the Qing dynasty of China between 1856 and 1860. It was the second major conflict in the Opium Wars, which were fought over the right to import opium to China, and resulted in a second defeat for the Qing and the forced legalisation of the opium trade. It caused many Chinese officials to believe that conflicts with the Western powers were no longer traditional wars, but part of a looming national crisis.

On 8 October 1856, Qing officials seized the Arrow, a British-registered cargo ship, and arrested its Chinese sailors. The British consul, Harry Parkes, protested, upon which the viceroy of Liangguang, Ye Mingchen, delivered most of the sailors to the British on 22 October, but refused to release the rest. The next day, British gunboats shelled the city of Canton. The British government decided to seek redress from China and dispatched a naval force led by Michael Seymour, and France joined in the action, citing as its reason the murder of a French missionary in China. After coordination with each other, the British and French stormed Canton in December 1857. Ye was captured and the governor of Guangdong surrendered. The alliance then moved north to demand a treaty from the Qing court, and on 20 May 1858, captured the Taku Forts, stormed Tianjin, and threatened the capital Beijing. The Qing asked for peace, and signed the Treaty of Tientsin with Great Britain and France in 1858.

However, the Xianfeng Emperor refused to ratify the treaty, after which the Qing general Sengge Rinchen restarted the war with the British and French that month. Allied reinforcements sailed from Hong Kong, and his troops were defeated. As the alliance's forces advanced toward Beijing, Parkes and a number of British and French officers were captured as hostages, and some were tortured or murdered. These events prompted Lord Elgin to order his soldiers to loot and burn the Old Summer Palace as soon as they captured Beijing. The emperor and his entourage fled to Rehe, while Prince Gong stayed to conduct the negotiations, signing the Convention of Peking with the alliance on 24 October 1860, thus ratifying the Treaty of Tientsin and bringing the Second Opium War to an end.

During and after the Second Opium War, the Qing government was also forced to sign treaties with Russia, such as the Treaty of Aigun and the Convention of Peking. As a result, China ceded more than 1.5 million square kilometres (0.58 million square miles) of territory to Russia in its north-east and north-west. With the conclusion of the war, the Qing government was able to concentrate on countering the Taiping Rebellion and maintaining its rule. Among other things, the Convention of Peking ceded the Kowloon Peninsula to the British as part of Hong Kong.

== Names ==
The terms "Second War" and "Arrow War" are both used in literature. "Second Opium War" refers to one of Britain's strategic objectives, legalizing the opium trade. China's defeat also opened up all of China to British merchants, and exempted foreign imports from internal transit duties. "Arrow War" refers to the name of the vessel which became the starting point of the conflict.

== Prelude ==
The war followed on from the First Opium War. In 1842, the Treaty of Nanking granted an indemnity and extraterritoriality to Britain, the opening of five treaty ports, and the cession of Hong Kong Island. The failure of the treaty to satisfy British goals of improved trade and diplomatic relations led to the Second Opium War (1856–1860). In China, the First Opium War is considered to have been the beginning of modern Chinese history.

Between the two wars, repeated acts of aggression against British subjects led in 1847 to the Expedition to Canton which assaulted and took, by a coup de main, the forts of the Bocca Tigris resulting in the spiking of 879 guns.

== Outbreak ==
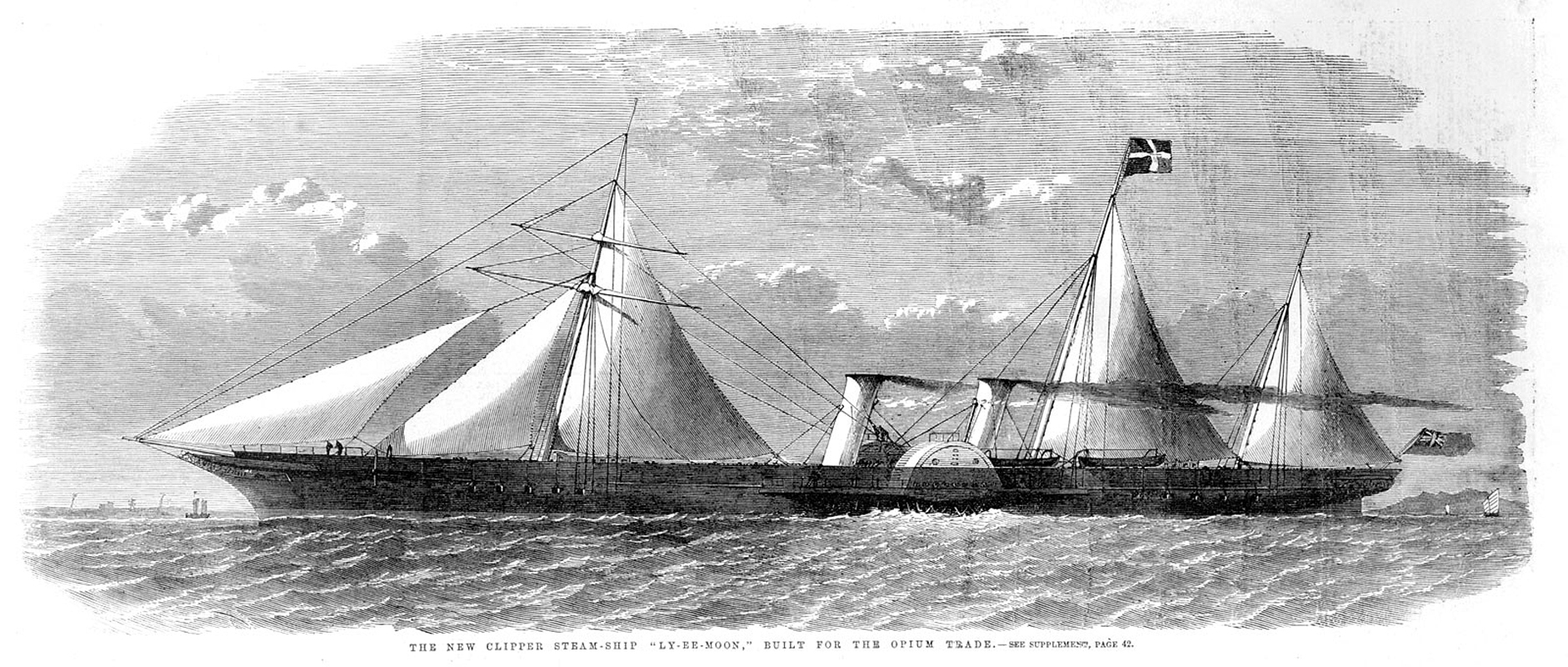
The Illustrated London News print of the steamship Ly-ee-moon, built for the opium trade, c. 1859

The 1850s saw the rapid growth of Western imperialism. Some of the shared goals of the Western powers were the expansion of their overseas markets and the establishment of new ports of call. The French Treaty of Huangpu, and the American Wangxia Treaty, both contained clauses allowing renegotiation of the treaties after 12 years of being in effect. In an effort to expand its privileges in China, Britain demanded that the Qing authorities renegotiate the Treaty of Nanjing (signed in 1842), citing its most favoured nation status. The British demands included opening all of China to British merchant companies, the legalising of the opium trade, the exemption of foreign imports from internal transit duties, the suppression of piracy, the regulation of the coolie trade, permission for a British ambassador to reside in Beijing, and that the English-language version of all treaties takes precedence over the Chinese language one.

=== Arrow incident ===
To give Chinese merchant vessels operating around treaty ports the same privileges accorded to British ships by the Treaty of Nanjing, British authorities granted the vessels British registration in Hong Kong. In October 1856, Chinese marines in Canton seized a cargo ship called the Arrow on suspicion of piracy, arresting twelve of its fourteen Chinese crew members. The Arrow, which had previously been used by pirates, was captured by the Chinese government and subsequently resold. It was then registered as a British ship and still flew the British flag at the time of its detention, though its registration had expired. Its captain, Thomas Kennedy, who was aboard a nearby vessel at the time, reported seeing Chinese marines pull the British flag down from the ship. The British consul in Canton, Harry Parkes, contacted Ye Mingchen, imperial commissioner and Viceroy of Liangguang, to demand the immediate release of the crew, and an apology for the alleged insult to the flag. Ye released nine of the crew members but refused to release the other three.

=== First Battle of Canton (1856) ===
On 23 October, the British destroyed four barrier forts. On 25 October, a demand was made that the British be allowed to enter Canton. The next day, the British began to bombard the city, firing one shot every 10 minutes. Ye Mingchen issued a bounty on every British head taken. On 29 October, the Royal Navy blasted a hole in the poorly defended and inadequate city walls. The troops entered Canton, with the flag of the United States being planted on the walls and residence of Ye Mingchen by James Keenan, the U.S. Consul. Losses were three killed and 12 wounded. Negotiations failed and the city was bombarded. On 6 November, 23 war junks attacked and were destroyed. There were pauses for talks, with the British bombarding at intervals, causing fires. On 5 January 1857, the British returned to Hong Kong.

On 3 March 1857, the British government lost a Parliamentary vote regarding the Arrow incident and what had taken place at Canton to the end of the previous year. This defeat led to a general election in April 1857 which increased the government's majority.

In April, the British government asked the United States of America and Russia if they were interested in alliances, but both parties rejected the offer. In May 1857, the Indian Mutiny became serious, and British troops destined for China were diverted to India. which was considered the priority issue.

=== Intervention of France ===
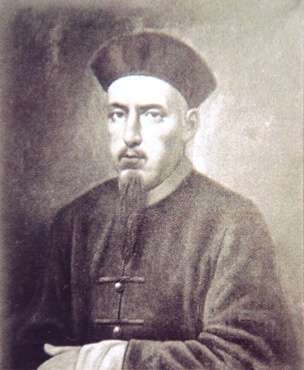
The execution of the Paris Foreign Missions Society missionary Auguste Chapdelaine was the official cause of the French involvement in the Second Opium War.

France joined the British action against China, prompted by complaints from their envoy, Baron Jean-Baptiste-Louis Gros, over the execution of a French missionary, Auguste Chapdelaine, by Chinese local authorities in Guangxi province, which at that time was not open to foreigners.

The British and the French joined forces under Admiral Sir Michael Seymour. In late 1857, a joint British and French army attacked and occupied Canton (today Guangzhou). A joint committee of the Alliance was formed. The Allies left the city governor at his post in order to maintain order on behalf of the victors. The British-French alliance maintained control of Canton for nearly four years.

The coalition then cruised north to briefly capture the Taku Forts near Tianjin in May 1858.

=== Intervention of the US and Russia ===
The United States and Russia sent envoys to Hong Kong to offer military help to the British and French, though in the end Russia sent no military aid.

The U.S. was involved in a minor concurrent conflict during the war, though it ignored the UK's offer of alliance and did not coordinate with the Anglo-French forces. In 1856, the Chinese garrison at Canton shelled a United States Navy steamer, and the U.S. Navy retaliated in the Battle of the Pearl River Forts. The ships bombarded then attacked the river forts near Canton, taking them. Diplomatic efforts were renewed afterwards, and the American and Chinese governments signed an agreement for U.S. neutrality in the Second Opium War.

=== Second battle of Canton (1857) ===
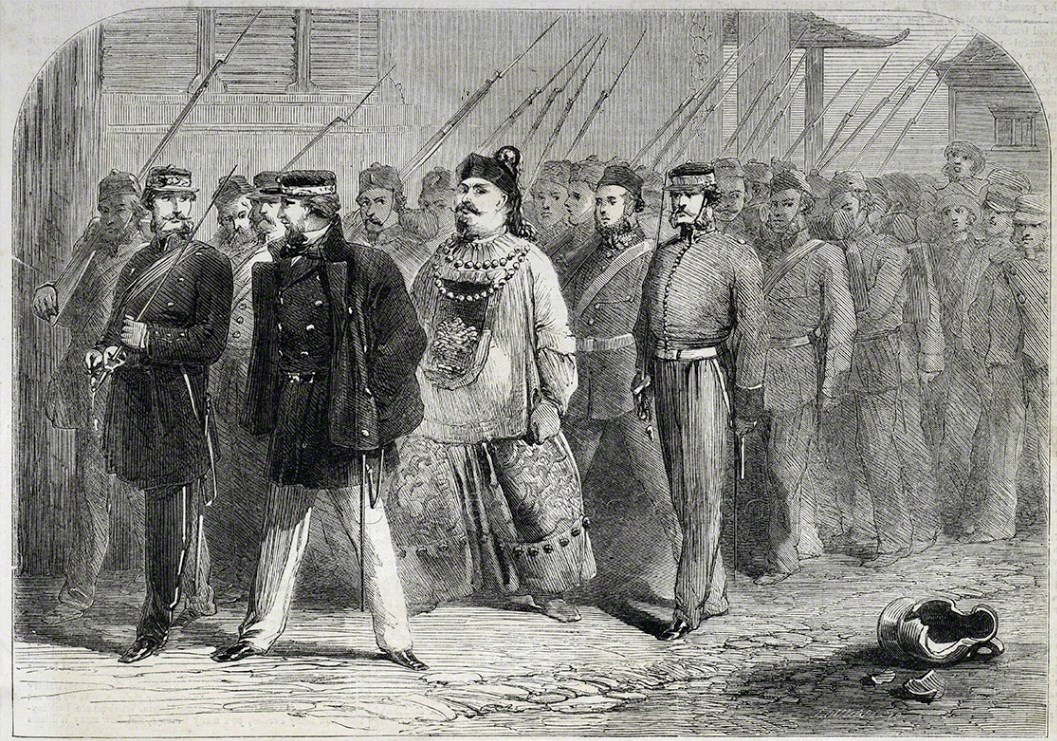
The capture of Ye Mingchen after the fall of Canton

Throughout 1857, British forces began to assemble in Hong Kong, joined by a French force. In December 1857 they had sufficient ships and men to raise the issue of the non-fulfilment of the treaty obligations by which the right of entry into Canton had been accorded. Parkes delivered an ultimatum, supported by Hong Kong governor Sir John Bowring and Admiral Sir Michael Seymour, threatening on 14 December to bombard Canton if the men were not released within 24 hours.

The remaining crew of the Arrow were then released, with no apology from Viceroy Ye Mingchen who also refused to honour the treaty terms. Seymour, Major General van Straubenzee and Admiral de Genouilly agreed the plan to attack Canton as ordered. This event came to be known as the Arrow Incident and provided the alternative name of the ensuing conflict.

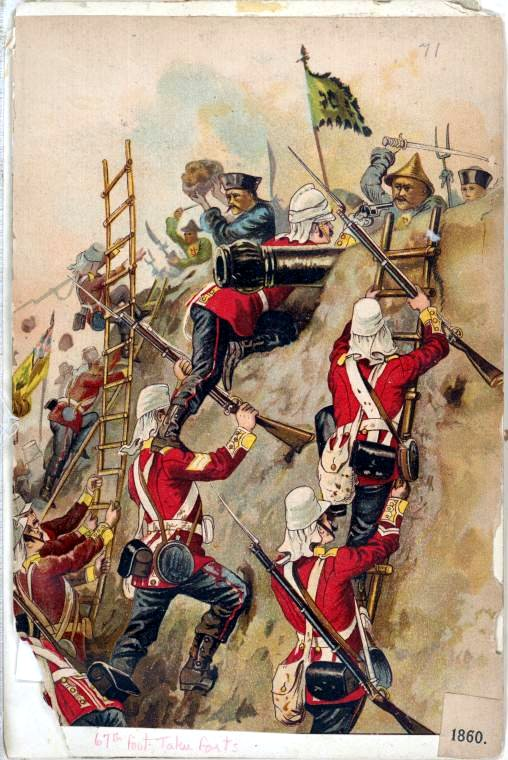
British troops taking a fort in 1860

Though the British were delayed by the Indian Rebellion of 1857, they followed up the Arrow Incident in 1856 and attacked Guangzhou from the Pearl River. Viceroy Ye Mingchen ordered all Chinese soldiers manning the forts not to resist the British incursion. After taking the fort near Canton with little effort, the British Army attacked Canton.

The capture of Canton, on 1 January 1858, a city with a population of over 1,000,000 by less than 6,000 troops, resulted in the British and French forces suffering 15 killed and 113 wounded. 200–650 of the defenders and inhabitants became casualties. Ye Mingchen was captured and exiled to Calcutta, India, where he starved himself to death.

Meanwhile, in Hong Kong, there was a possible attempt to poison John Bowring and his family in January, known as the Esing Bakery incident. However, if it was deliberate, the baker who had been charged with lacing bread with arsenic bungled the attempt by putting an excess of the poison into the dough, such that his victims vomited sufficient quantities of the poison that they had only a non-lethal dose left in their system. Criers were sent out with an alert, preventing further injury.

When known in Britain, the Arrow incident (and the British military response) became the subject of controversy. The British House of Commons on 3 March passed a resolution by 263 to 249 against the Government saying:

That this House has heard with the concern of the conflicts which have occurred between the British and Chinese authorities on the Canton River; and, without expressing an opinion as to the extent to which the Government of China may have afforded this country cause of complaint respecting the non-fulfilment of the Treaty of 1842, this House considers that the papers which have been laid on the table fail to establish satisfactory grounds for the violent measures resorted to at Canton in the late affair of the Arrow, and that a Select Committee be appointed to inquire into the state of our commercial relations with China.

In response, the Whig Prime Minister Lord Palmerston attacked the patriotism of the Whigs who sponsored the resolution, and Parliament was dissolved, causing the British general election of March 1857.

The Chinese issue figured prominently in the election, at which Palmerston won an increased majority, silencing the voices within the Whig faction who supported China. The new parliament decided to seek redress from China based on the report about the Arrow Incident submitted by Harry Parkes. The French Empire, the United States, and the Russian Empire received requests from Britain to form an alliance.

== Interlude ==
=== Treaties of Tianjin ===
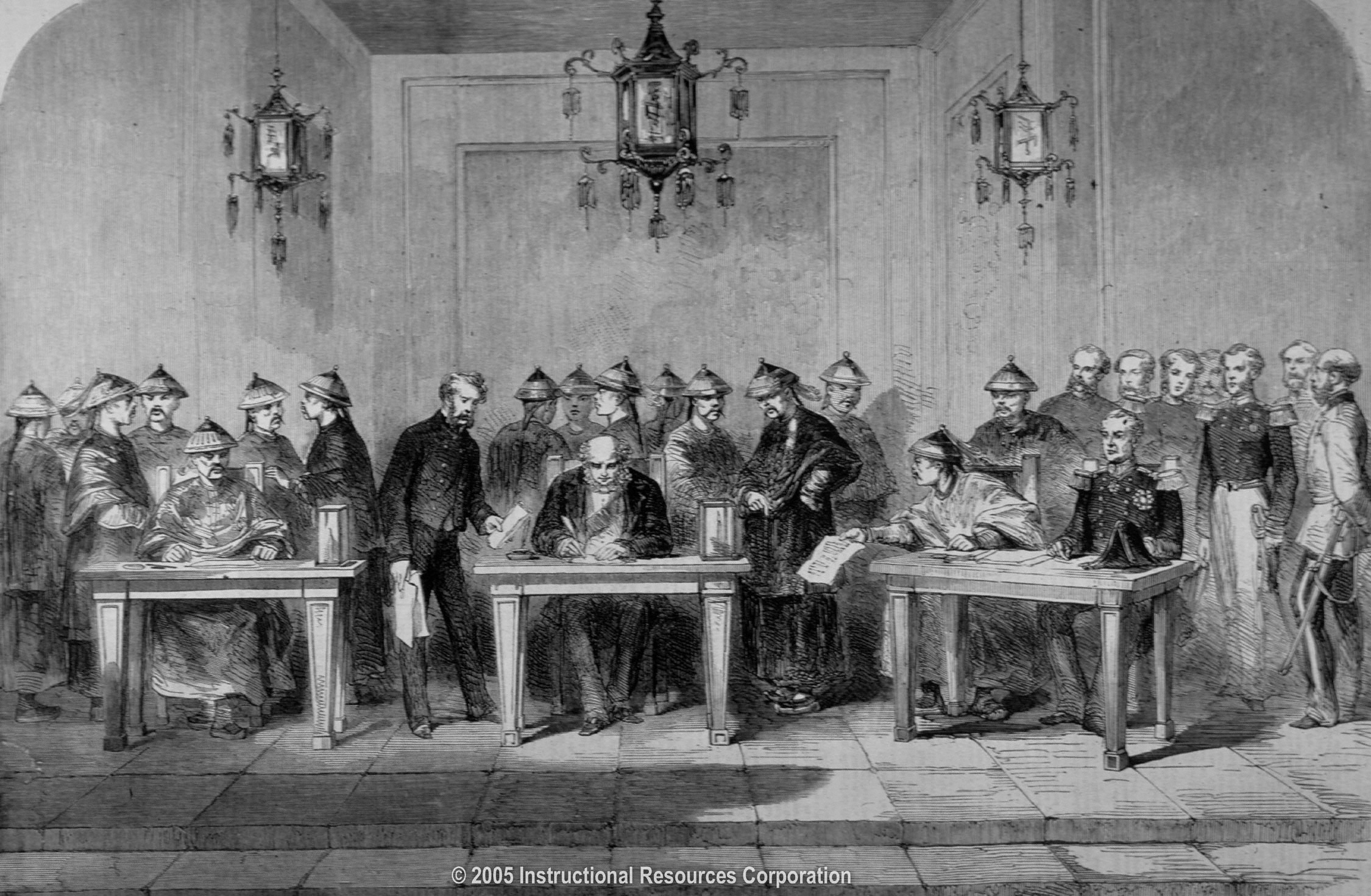
Signing of the Treaty of Tientsin in 1858

In June 1858, the first part of the war ended with the four Treaties of Tientsin (Tianjin), to which Britain, France, Russia, and the U.S. were parties. These treaties opened 11 more ports to Western trade. The Chinese initially refused to ratify the treaties.

The major points of the treaty were:

1. Britain, France, Russia, and the U.S. would have the right to establish diplomatic legations (small embassies) in Beijing (a closed city at the time)
2. Ten more Chinese ports would be opened for foreign trade, including Niuzhuang, Tamsui, Hankou, and Nanjing
3. The right of all foreign vessels including commercial ships to navigate freely on the Yangtze River
4. The right of foreigners to travel in the internal regions of China, which had been formerly banned
5. China was to pay an indemnity of four million taels of silver to Britain and two million to France.

=== Treaty of Aigun ===
On 28 May 1858, the separate Treaty of Aigun was signed with Russia to revise the Chinese and Russian border as determined by the Nerchinsk Treaty in 1689. Russia gained the left bank of the Amur River, pushing the border south from the Stanovoy mountains. A later treaty, the Convention of Peking in 1860, gave Russia control over a non-freezing area on the Pacific coast, where Russia founded the city of Vladivostok in 1860.

== Second phase (1858–1860) ==
=== Three battles of Taku Forts ===
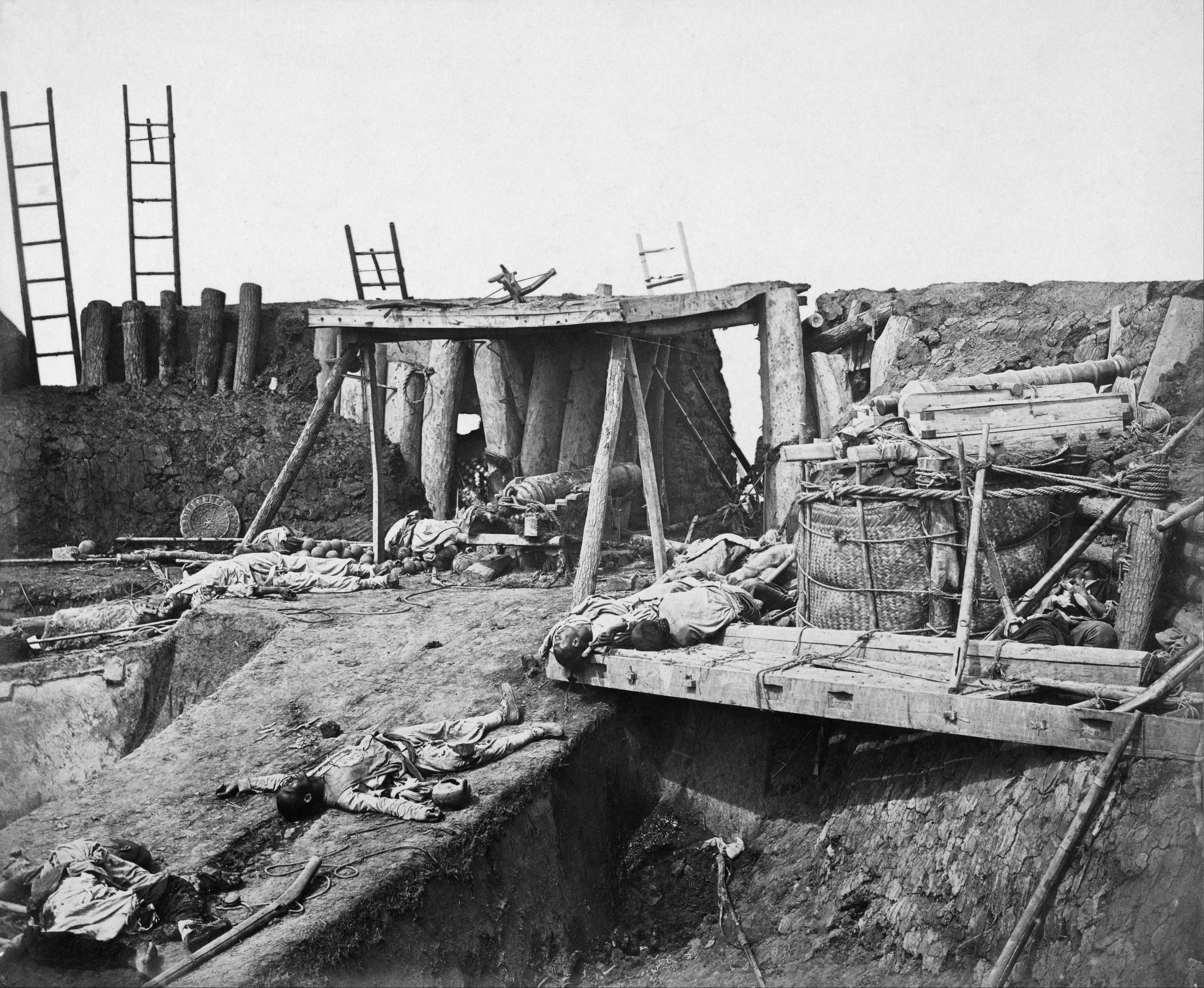
Interior of the Angle of Taku North Fort Immediately After Its Capture

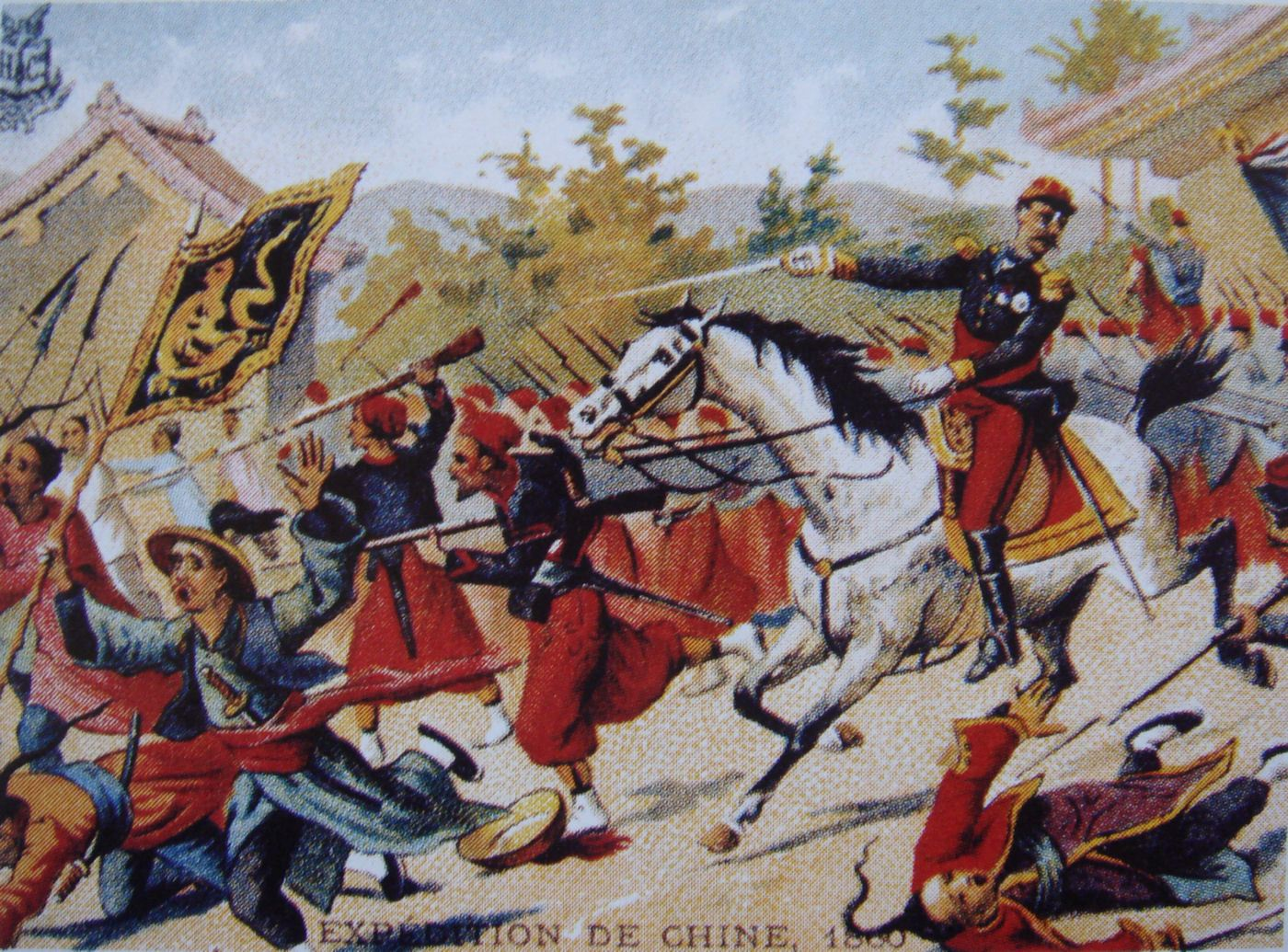
Cousin-Montauban leading French forces during the 1860 campaign

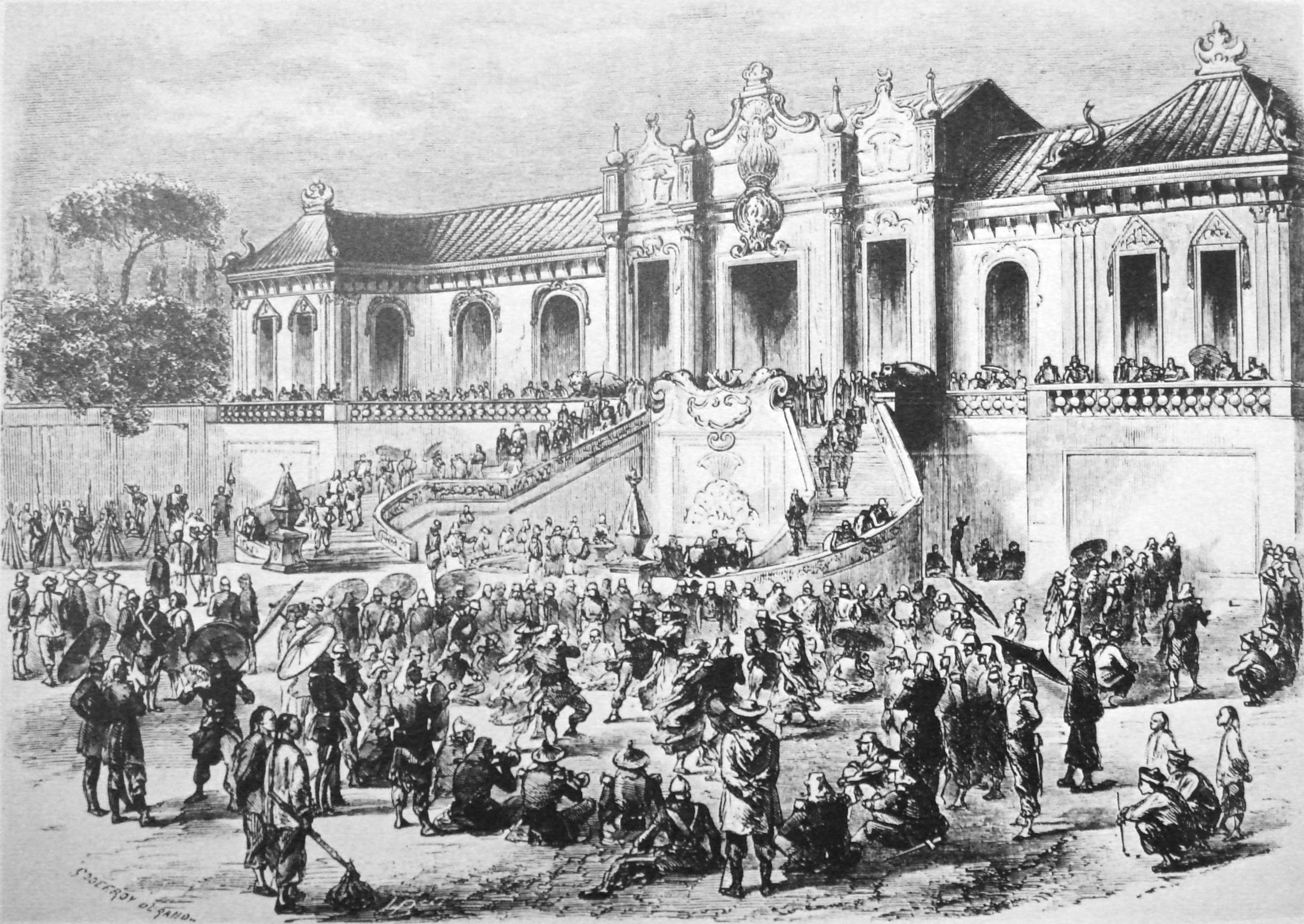
Looting of the Old Summer Palace by Anglo-French forces in 1860

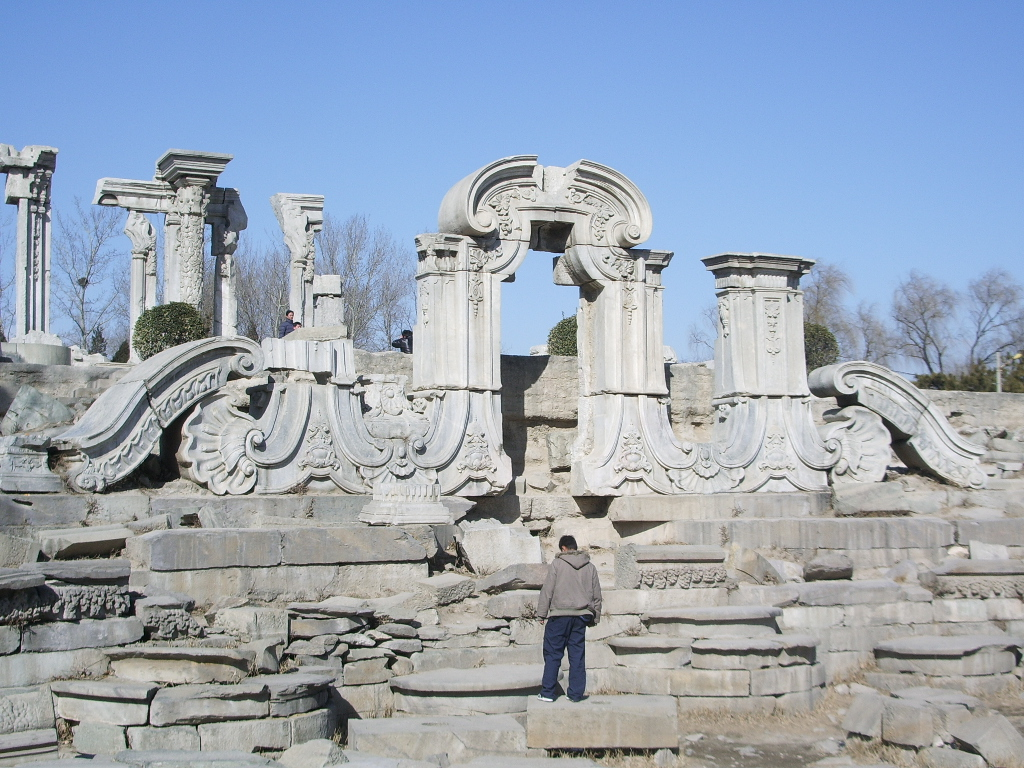
Ruins of the "Western style" complex in the Old Summer Palace, burnt down by Anglo-French forces

On 20 May, the British were successful at the First Battle of Taku Forts, but the peace treaty returned the forts to the Qing army.

In June 1858, shortly after the Qing imperial court agreed to the disadvantageous treaties, hawkish ministers prevailed upon the Xianfeng Emperor to resist Western encroachment. On 2 June 1858, the Xianfeng Emperor ordered the Mongol general Sengge Rinchen to guard the Taku Forts (also romanized as Ta-ku Forts and also called Daku Forts) near Tianjin. Sengge Rinchen reinforced the forts with additional artillery pieces. He also brought 4,000 Mongol cavalry from Chahar and Suiyuan.

The Second Battle of Taku Forts took place in June 1859. A British naval force with 2,200 troops and 21 ships, under the command of Admiral Sir James Hope, sailed north from Shanghai to Tianjin with newly appointed Anglo-French envoys for the embassies in Beijing. They sailed to the mouth of the Hai River guarded by the Taku Forts near Tianjin and demanded to continue inland to Beijing. Sengge Rinchen replied that the Anglo-French envoys might land up the coast at Beitang and proceed to Beijing but he refused to allow armed troops to accompany them to the Chinese capital. The Anglo-French forces insisted on landing at Taku instead of Beitang and escorting the diplomats to Beijing. On the night of 24 June 1859, a small group of British forces blew up the iron obstacles that the Chinese had placed in the Baihe River. The next day, the British forces sought to forcibly sail into the river, and shelled the Taku Forts. Low tide and soft mud prevented their landing, however, and accurate fire from Sengge Rinchen's cannons sank four gunboats and severely damaged two others. American Commodore Josiah Tattnall III, though under orders to maintain neutrality, declared "blood is thicker than water", and provided covering fire to protect the British convoy's retreat. The failure to take the Taku Forts was a blow to British prestige, and anti-foreign resistance reached a crescendo within the Qing imperial court.

Once the Indian Mutiny was finally quelled, Sir Colin Campbell, commander-in-chief in India, was free to amass troops and supplies for another offensive in China. A 'soldiers' general', Campbell's experience of casualties from disease in the First Opium War led him to provide the British forces with more than enough materiel and supplies, and casualties were light.

The Third Battle of Taku Forts took place in the summer of 1860. London once more dispatched Lord Elgin with an Anglo-French force of 11,000 British troops under General James Hope Grant and 6,700 French troops under General Cousin-Montauban. They pushed north with 173 ships from Hong Kong and captured the port cities of Yantai and Dalian to seal the Bohai Gulf. On 3 August they carried out a landing near Beitang (also romanized as "Pei-t'ang"), some 3 kilometres (1.9 mi) from the Taku Forts, which they captured after three weeks on 21 August.

Southern Chinese laborers served with the French and British forces. One observer reported that the "Chinese coolies", as he called them, "renegades though they were, served the British faithfully and cheerfully... At the assault of the Peiho Forts in 1860 they carried the French ladders to the ditch, and, standing in the water up to their necks, supported them with their hands to enable the storming party to cross. It was not usual to take them into action; they, however, bore the dangers of a distant fire with great composure, evincing a strong desire to close with their compatriots, and engage them in mortal combat with their bamboos."

=== Burning of the Old Summer Palaces ===
After taking Tianjin on 23 August 1860, the imperial emissary and word arrived that the British had kidnapped the prefect of Tianjin. Parkes was arrested in retaliation on 18 September. Also captured were a number of British and French officers, Sikh soldiers, and a journalist from The Times. Parkes and the others were imprisoned, tortured, and interrogated.

The prisoners had been tortured by having their limbs bound with rope until their flesh was lacerated and became infected with maggots, and by having dung and dirt forced into their throats. Several were executed by beheading, their corpses fed to animals. Captured coolies who had worked for the allies were buried up to their necks and left to dogs.

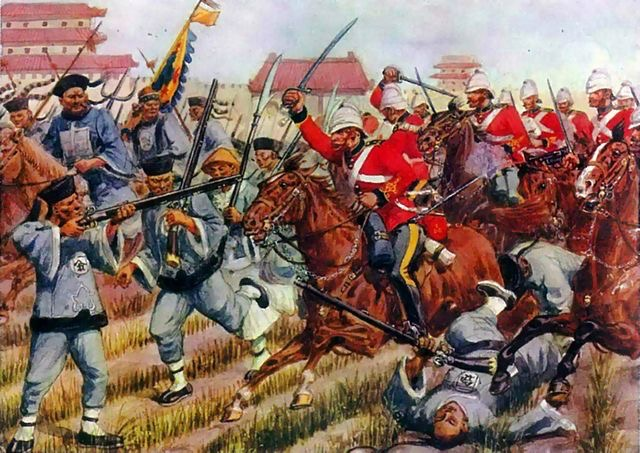
British taking Beijing

The Anglo-French forces clashed with Sengge Rinchen's Mongol cavalry on 18 September at the battle of Zhangjiawan before proceeding toward the outskirts of Beijing for a decisive battle in Tongzhou (also romanized as Tungchow). On 21 September, at Baliqiao (Eight Mile Bridge), Sengge Rinchen's 10,000 troops, including the elite Mongol cavalry, were annihilated after doomed frontal charges against concentrated firepower of the Anglo-French forces. The French army arrived at the Summer Palace outside Beijing on 6 October, followed by the British a day later.

With the Qing army devastated, the Xianfeng Emperor fled the capital and left behind his brother, Prince Gong, to take charge of peace negotiations. Xianfeng first fled to the Chengde Summer Palace and then to Rehe Province. Anglo-French troops began looting the Summer Palace (Yiheyuan, located in Haidian, Beijing) and Old Summer Palace (Yuanmingyuan) immediately (as they were full of valuable artwork).

After the release of Parkes and the surviving prisoners on 8 October, the extent of their mistreatment became apparent. The destruction of the Forbidden City was discussed, as proposed by Lord Elgin, to discourage the Qing Empire from using kidnapping as a bargaining tool, and to exact revenge on the mistreatment of their prisoners. However, an attack on Beijing was ruled out, as this had already been presented as threat for other terms. Elgin decided on burning the Summer Palace. In a letter, he explained that the burning of the palace was the punishment "which would fall, not on the people, who may be comparatively innocent, but exclusively on the Emperor, whose direct personal responsibility for the crime committed is established".

On 18 October, British soldiers burnt the Old Summer Palace, the French refusing to assist. The razing of the buildings took two days, with imperial property in the vicinity also destroyed. Most accounts say that the Old Summer Palace was burnt for three days and three nights.

== Awards ==
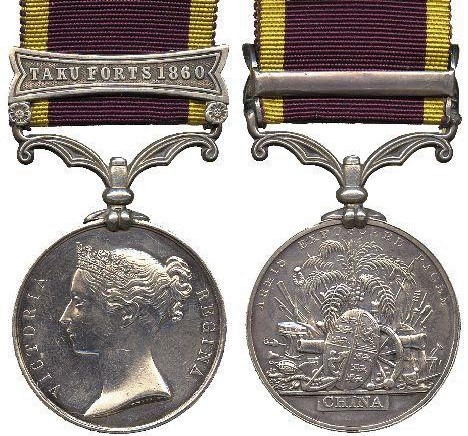
Second China War Medal, with Taku Forts 1860 bar.

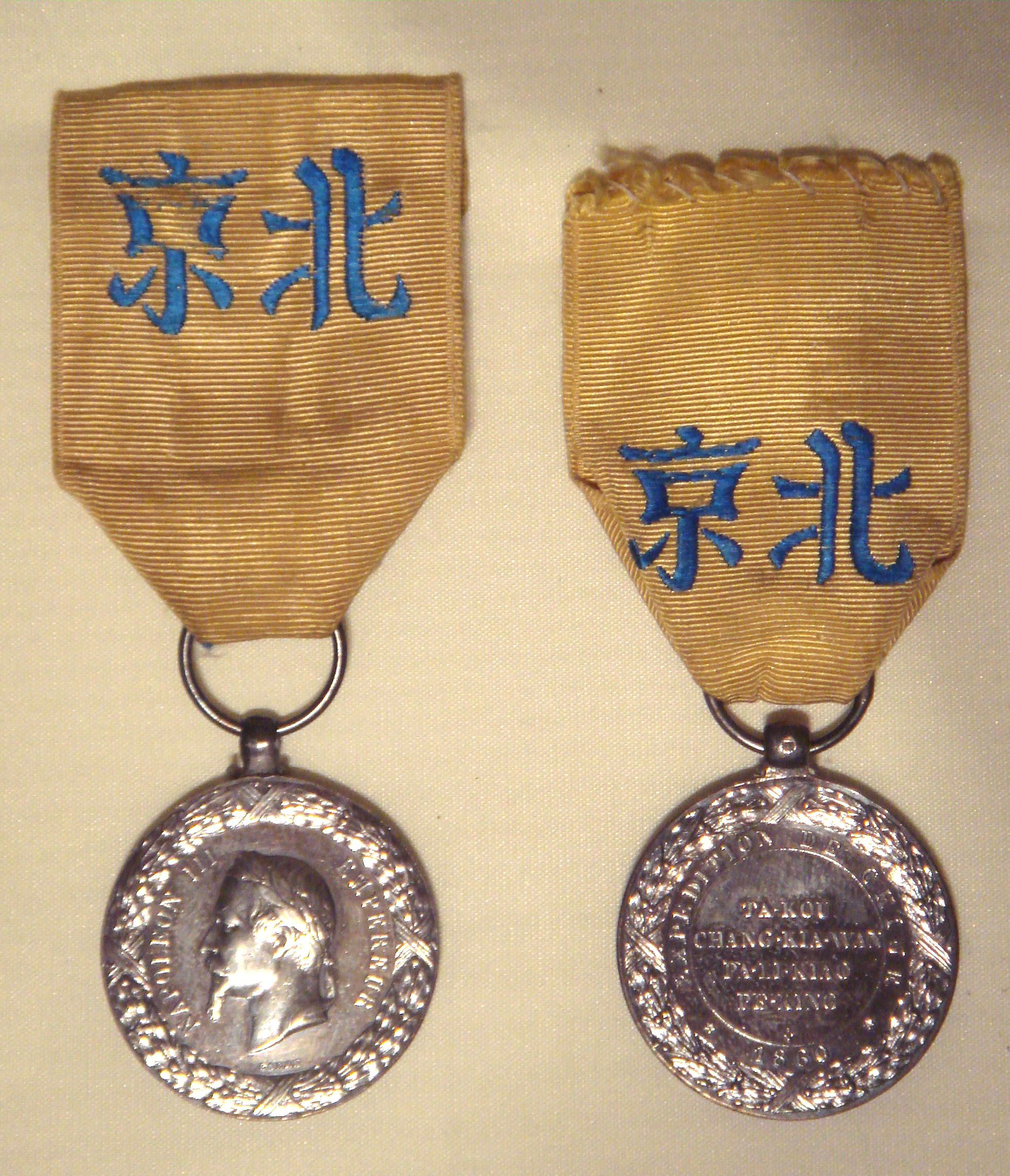
French medal of the China Campaign ("Médaille de la Campagne de Chine"), 1861, in the Musée de la Légion d'Honneur. The Chinese characters inscribed on the ribbons read 'Beijing'.

Both Britain (Second China War Medal) and France (Commemorative medal of the 1860 China Expedition) issued campaign medals. The British medal had the following clasps: China 1842, Fatshan 1857, Canton 1857, Taku Forts 1858, Taku Forts 1860, Peking 1860.

== Aftermath ==
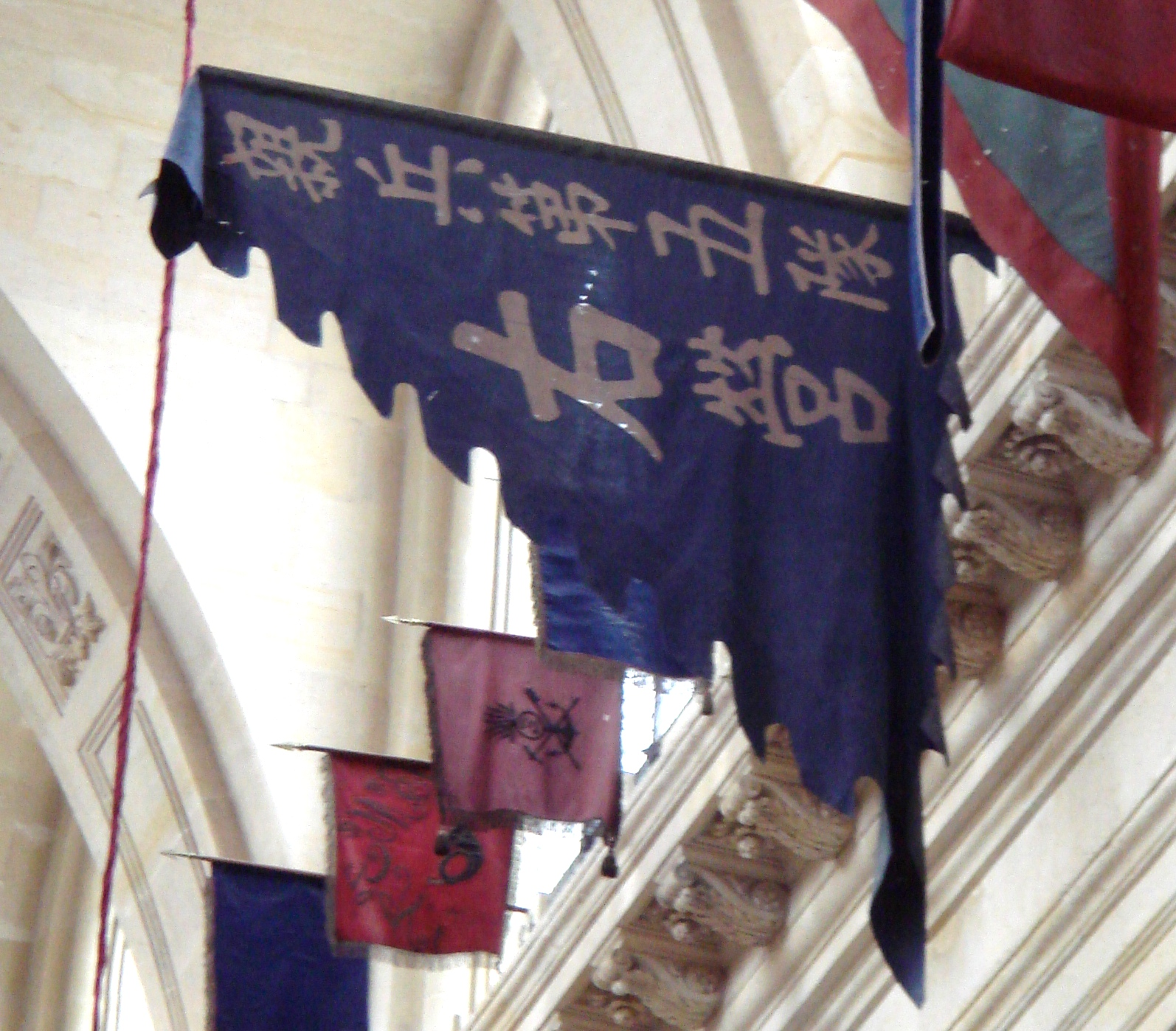
Qing flag seized by Anglo-French forces. The flag reads "親兵第五隊右營": Bodyguard, fifth squadron, right battalion (unit types are approximate), Les Invalides.

On 24 October, the emperor's brother, Prince Gong, conceded to the allied demands, the emperor having fled to Chengde on 22 September. British and French troops entered Beijing, where the Treaty of Tientsin was ratified by the Convention of Peking.

The British, French and—thanks to the schemes of Ignatiev—the Russians were all granted a permanent diplomatic presence in Beijing (something the Qing Empire resisted to the very end as it suggested equality between China and the European powers). The Chinese had to pay 8 million taels to Britain and France. Kowloon was ceded to the British owned Hong Kong. The opium trade was legalized and Christians were granted full civil rights, including the right to own property, and the right to evangelize.

The content of the Convention of Beijing included:

1. China's signing of the Treaty of Tianjin
2. Opening Tianjin as a trade port
3. Cede No.1 District of Kowloon (south of present-day Boundary Street) to Britain
4. Freedom of religion established in China
5. British ships were allowed to carry indentured Chinese to the Americas
6. Indemnity to Britain and France increasing to 8 million taels of silver apiece
7. Legalization of the opium trade

Two weeks later, Ignatiev forced the Qing government to sign a "Supplementary Treaty of Peking", which ceded the Maritime Provinces east of the Ussuri River (forming part of Outer Manchuria) to the Russians, who went on to found the port of Vladivostok between 1860 and 1861. The Anglo-French victory was heralded in the British press as a triumph for British Prime Minister Lord Palmerston, which made his popularity rise to new heights. British merchants were delighted at the prospects of the expansion of trade in the Far East. Other foreign powers were pleased with the outcome too, since they hoped to take advantage of the opening-up of China.

The defeat of the Qing army by a relatively small Anglo-French military force (outnumbered at least 10 to 1 by the Qing army) coupled with the flight (and subsequent death) of the Xianfeng Emperor, and the burning of the Summer Palace, was a shocking blow to the once powerful Qing Empire. "Beyond a doubt, by 1860 the ancient civilization that was China had been thoroughly defeated and humiliated by the West." After the war, a major modernization movement, known as the Self-Strengthening Movement, began in China, and several institutional reforms were initiated. As the Qing government became increasingly obligated to pay indemnities and protect Westerners following its loss in the Second Opium War and given the Unequal Treaties, resistance to Qing rule increased.

The opium trade incurred intense opposition from the later British Prime Minister William Ewart Gladstone. As a member of Parliament, Gladstone called it "most infamous and atrocious", referring to the opium trade between China and British India in particular. Gladstone was fiercely against both of the Opium Wars, was ardently opposed to the British trade in opium to China, and denounced British violence against Chinese. Gladstone lambasted it as "Palmerston's Opium War" and said that he felt "in dread of the judgments of God upon England for our national iniquity towards China" in May 1840. Gladstone made a famous speech in Parliament against the First Opium War, criticising it as "a war more unjust in its origin, a war more calculated in its progress to cover this country with permanent disgrace". His hostility to opium stemmed from the effects of the drug upon his sister Helen. Due to his disgust at the First Opium War, brought on by Palmerston, Gladstone was initially reluctant to join the government of Robert Peel, but did so in 1841.

Seven awards were made of the Victoria Cross, all for gallantry shown on 21 August 1860 by soldiers of the 44th Regiment of Foot and the 67th Regiment of Foot at the Battle of Taku Forts (1860) (see List of Victoria Cross recipients by campaign)

== Battle honours ==
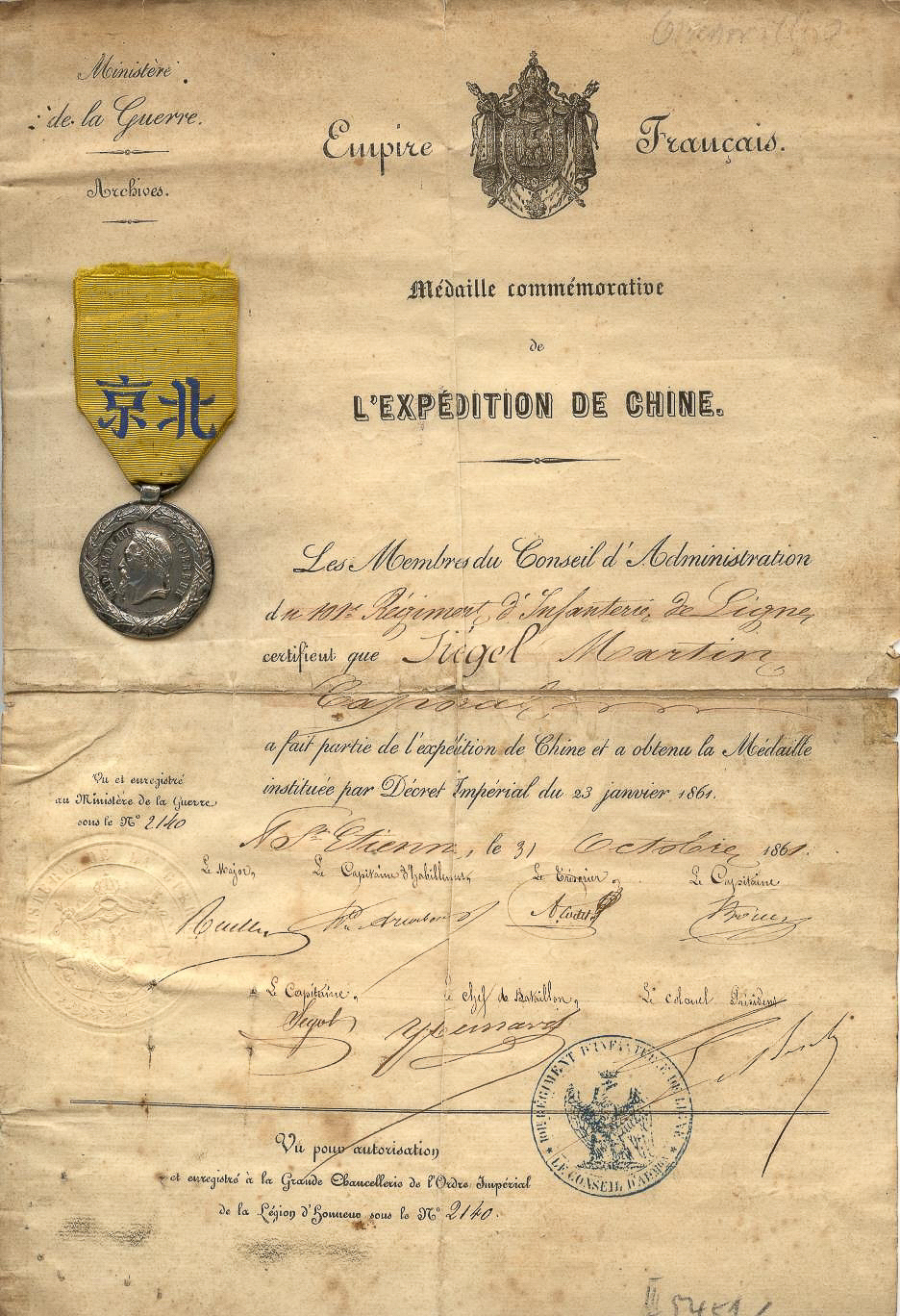
Médaille de la Campagne de Chine, as Awarded to a member of the 101st Infantry

The following regiments fought in the campaign:

- British and Empire
  - Cavalry Brigade
    - 1st King's Dragoon Guards
    - Probyn's Sikh Horse (5th Horse – Lucknow)
    - Fane's Mahratta Cavalry (19th Lancers – Cawnpore)
  - Infantry
    - 1st Regiment of Foot (Scots – 2nd Battalion)
    - 2nd Regiment of Foot (Queen's)
    - 3rd Regiment of Foot (Buffs)
    - 8th Regiment of Punjab Infantry (Punjab Regiment – 6th Battalion – Pakistan)
    - 15th Ludhiana Sikhs (Sikh Regiment – 2nd Battalion – India)
    - 19th Punjaub Infantry (Punjab Regiment – 5th Battalion – Pakistan)
    - 23rd Punjab Pioneers (Sikh Light Infantry – India)
    - 31st Regiment of Foot (Huntingdonshire)
    - 44th Regiment of Foot (East Essex)
    - 60th Regiment of Foot (King's Royal Rifles)
    - 67th Regiment of Foot (South Hampshire)
    - 99th Regiment of Foot (Lanarkshire)
    - Royal Marines
  - Artillery
    - Royal Artillery
  - Engineers
    - Royal Engineers, no. 8 company
    - Madras Sappers and Miners (Indian Army Corps of Engineers)
- French
  - Cavalry
    - Spahis
  - Infantry
    - 101e Régiment d'Infanterie
    - 102e Régiment d'Infanterie de Ligne
- US
  - Naval
    - USS San Jacinto

== See also ==
- China–United Kingdom relations
- Imperialism in Asia
- Nian Rebellion
- Miao Rebellion (1854–73)
- Dungan Revolt (1862–77)
- Panthay Rebellion
- History of Beijing
- History of opium in China
- Taiping Rebellion
