= Whampoa =

Whampoa is a romanisation of 黃埔 / 黄埔, and may refer to:

== Mainland China ==
- Huangpu District, Guangzhou
- Pazhou, an island known historically as Whampoa
- Whampoa anchorage, the intermediate way station between Macao and Guangzhou
- Whampoa Military Academy, a military academy of the Republic of China in Guangzhou
- Whampoa Pagoda, in Guangzhou
- Treaty of Whampoa, a commercial treaty between France and China, concluded in 1844

== Hong Kong ==
- Whampoa Dock, a Hong Kong dockyard operated in the Crown Colony of Hong Kong from 1863 to 1979
- Whampoa Garden, a private housing estate built in the 1980s located on part of the former site of the dock
- Whampoa station, terminal station on the Kwun Tong line of the MTR in Hong Kong
- Hutchison Whampoa, a Hong Kong conglomerate, the eventual owner of the Whampoa Dock, Whampoa Garden, A.S. Watson & Co., Superdrug, and Hutchison 3G

== Singapore ==
- Whampoa, Singapore, a housing estate located in the district of Novena
- Hoo Ah Kay, a prominent 19th century Singaporean businessman and community leader.
- Whampoa Single Member Constituency, a former constituency represented by Heng Chee How that contains the housing estate of Whampoa along with other areas

== See also ==
- Huangpu (disambiguation), the pinyin romanisation of the same Chinese characters
