= Ding'an Town =

Ding'an 定安镇
- Town
- Location of the seat in Guangxi
- Coordinates: 24°18′55″N 105°39′56″E
- Country: China
- Province: Guangxi
- County: Tianlin County

Area
  - Total: 299 km^{2} (115 sq mi)

Population (2019)
  - Total: 14,711
  - Density: 49.2/km^{2} (127/sq mi)
- Time zone: UTC+8 (China Standard)
- Postal code: 533311

Ding'an Town is a township-level administrative unit under the jurisdiction of Tianlin County, Baise, Guangxi Zhuang Autonomous Region, People's Republic of China. The town's administrative area spans 299 square kilometers. The town government is located in Nami Village, Nami New District, 96 kilometers from Tianlin County seat.

The Xilin Incident Memorial Site is situated within the town's jurisdiction.

== History ==
=== Ancient Period ===
Prior to the Han dynasty, this region belonged to the Gouding tribe. During the reign of Emperor Wu of Han, the King of Gouding submitted to the Han dynasty, and the area was incorporated into Zangke Commandery. From the Three Kingdoms period through the Western Jin dynasty, it was part of Xinggu Commandery's Jouting County. From the Eastern Jin dynasty to the Southern Liang dynasty, it belonged to Xiping Commandery. During the Northern Zhou dynasty and early Tang dynasty, it was part of Nanning Prefecture (present-day Yunnan). The Tang and Song Dynasties implemented the system of tributary states, while the Yuan and Ming Dynasties enforced the Tusi system. During the Tang dynasty, it was a tributary state under the jurisdiction of the Qianzhou Military Governorate. In the Song dynasty and Yuan dynasty, it belonged to Shanglin Dong. In the seventh year of the Yongle reign of the Ming dynasty, it was under the Shanglin Chieftain's Office. During the Wanli reign of the Ming dynasty, it was merged into Sicheng Prefecture.

=== Near Modern Era ===
In the fifth year of the Kangxi reign (1666) of the Qing dynasty, the Reform of the Tusi System was implemented. Xilin County was established on the territory of the former Shanglin Chieftain's Office, with its seat at Zhejiao Village (present-day Ding'an Market). Xilin County was the highest-level administrative division with its seat within the present-day territory of Ding'an Town. In the 28th year of the Guangxu reign (1902), Qing military commander Fang Fugong returned to his hometown. Finding the local name "Zhejiao" (meaning "frog-filled ditch" in Zhuang languages) unsuitable, he consulted local gentry to rename it. He composed a poem on the spot, from which the gentry extracted "Ding'an" as the new place name. Thus, Zhejiao in Xilin County was renamed Ding'an. In 1908, the Central District of Xilin County was established (with its seat at Ding'an Market). In the 22nd year of the Republic of China (1933), Ding'an Township was established within Xilin County.

=== Modern Era ===
In March 1950, the Xilin County People's Government was established, with Ding'an Township belonging to the First District. In August 1951, the Guangxi Provincial People's Government abolished Xilin County. The four large townships including Ding'an from the former Xilin County were merged into Tianxi County (later renamed Tianlin County), with Ding'an's territory becoming part of Tianlin County's Seventh District (administered from Ding'an). In 1958, the Xingfu People's Commune of Tianlin County was established (renamed Ding'an Commune in 1961). In 1984, it was reorganized into Ding'an Town.

== Geography and Climate ==
The town's terrain is predominantly mountainous, classified as a hilly region. Elevations peak in the north, decline in the south, and feature a lower-lying river valley corridor running east-west through the central area. There are 24 peaks exceeding 1,000 meters in elevation, with major summits including Guolipo, Pomoshan, and Guanshan. The highest peak within the township is Guolipo, located north of Balai Village in the northeastern part of Ding'an Town, reaching 1,252.3 meters above sea level.

Major rivers include the Tuoniang River and the Qingshui River (Namen River). The Tuoniang River is the largest tributary of the Yu River, flowing eastward from Xilin County through four villages—Naxiong, Baxin, Ding'an, and Weimi—in Ding'an Town before exiting Tianlin County via townships such as Badu, Bagui, and Liulong. The Qingshui River enters Ding'an Town from the north, passing through Yangrong, Nameng, and Ding'an villages before joining the Tuoniang River east of Ding'an Market.

Ding'an Town lies within a Humid subtropical climate zone at low latitudes, characterized by strong solar radiation, abundant heat, long summers, short winters, warm temperatures, and moderate rainfall. The annual average temperature is 21°C, with average annual precipitation of approximately 1,280 mm. Primary meteorological hazards include floods and early-season disasters.

== Transportation ==
=== Roadways ===
- Expressway: The Hexi Expressway has an entrance/exit at Ding'an Town;
- National Highway: China National Highway 357
- Provincial Highway: Provincial Highway 217 originates in Jiuzhou Town, passes through Ding'an Town, intersects with China National Highway 357, continues southward and terminates at the Yunnan-Guangxi border;
- County Road: County Road 956
- Rural Roads: In the latter half of 1998, the county launched a major campaign to build village-level roads, enabling Ding'an to achieve basic road connectivity to every village. By 2000, a county-wide initiative focused on hamlet-level roads, resulting in paved access roads to all villages, connectivity between all hamlets, and paved roads within some hamlets.

=== Waterways ===
The primary waterway within Ding'an is the Yu River. Flowing through townships such as Badu Yao Ethnic Township and Liulong Town, its depth ranges from 5 to 6 meters in summer and 1 to 2 meters in winter. During the Qing dynasty, the Viceroy of Yun-Gui dredged the Tuoniang River channel, using explosives to blast away submerged reefs and large rocks. Subsequently, small boats could travel directly from Ding'an to Guangnan County, Yunnan Province. Prior to 1936, medium-sized wooden vessels weighing up to one ton could navigate upstream from Baise directly to Ding'an Town. However, subsequent soil erosion created numerous shoals and swift currents, compounded by hydroelectric dam construction, rendering long-distance water transport impractical.

== Events ==
=== The Gengshen Incident ===
In March of the 10th year of the Xianfeng reign (1860), the Taiping Army forces under Shi Zhenji and Zeng Guangyi attempted to pass through Badu Pass in Ceheng County to join the main Taiping forces in Guizhou, but took a wrong turn and ended up in present-day Badu Yao Ethnic Township. They proceeded to Xilin County (present-day Ding'an Town) for rest and supplies. Upon departure, they were poisoned and ambushed by local gentry and local militia poisoned and ambushed them. The Taiping forces retaliated by massacring the town. It is said that over 3,000 people—including militia, government troops, and innocent civilians—perished. Survivors spent nearly half a month collecting corpses and clearing the streets, leaving the town in utter devastation, a scene too horrific to behold. This event is historically known as the "Gengshen Incident".

A local monument inscribed "Ten Thousand Graves" records:

In the tenth year of Xianfeng reign, bandits slaughtered the city, claiming countless victims of all ages and genders. The bodies were hastily buried shallowly at the time. Over the years, trampled by cattle and horses, the white bones lay exposed, a sight that pierced the heart. In the spring of the eleventh year of the Tongzhi reign, the faithful pooled funds to purchase large urns for proper interment. This monument now completes the restoration. The remaining funds are retained as a perpetual endowment for annual memorial rites. These few words are inscribed to commemorate the event.

Erected on an auspicious day of the twelfth lunar month, thirteenth year of Tongzhi

The Yong'an Landlord-Tenant Notice stele discovered in Nabi Township also records this event. Local landlord Cen lost "over a hundred" people in the incident. Objectively, the Taiping Army weakened the power of the local landlord class, leading to a pattern of "weak landlords and strong tenants" in the area.

=== Xilin Air Raid ===
In May 1941, nine Japanese aircraft bombed Ding'an Market, dropping nine bombs that destroyed sections of streets and residential buildings within the town.
