= Youyang anti-missionary riot =

1865 riot in Youyang, China

The Youyang anti-missionary riot (Chinese: 酉阳教案) occurred in Youyang, 365 kilometres (227 mi) southeast of Chongqing, Sichuan Province, China in 1865. It was one of many riots in and around Chongqing in the 19th century.

== Background ==
In 1862, a French mission arrived in Youyang and built church. Some of the local converts, under the church umbrella, run rampant, forcing neighbors to convert, arousing resentment.

== Event ==
In February 1865, hundreds of angry crowds ransacked the church. On August 27, 1865, people protested the bullying missionaries. Two days later, about ten people got into a verbal argument with a French missionary, and beat him to death.

== Aftermath ==
Sichuan viceroy ordered the death of a local and paid 80,000 taels of silver indemnity to the French.

== See also ==
- Anti-missionary riots in China
- Catholic Church in Sichuan
