= Huangpu =

Huangpu, also formerly romanized Whangpoo or Whang-Po, may refer to:

- Huangpu District, Shanghai, China
  - Huangpu River, in Shanghai, China
- Huangpu District, Guangzhou, Guangdong, China
  - Huangpu Military Academy, in Guangzhou, China
- Pazhou Island, formerly known as Whampoa or Huangpu, now in Haizhu District, Guangzhou, China
- Huangpu, Zhongshan, a town in Zhongshan, Guangdong, China
- Huangpu Road Station, a station on Line 1 in Wuhan, Hubei, China

== See also ==
- Whampoa (disambiguation), another former romanization of the same Chinese name
- Huangfu, a Chinese surname
