= Anti-missionary riot in Wuhu =

1891 riot in China

The anti-missionary riot in Wuhu, Anhui, China occurred in May 1891, against Roman Catholic mission.

== Background ==
People grow suspicious as two Chinese nuns walking the streets, anointing the holy water on children, they began to harasses the nuns and took them to the police. The nuns were returned to the Roman Catholic mission. People were not satisfied and called for a riot against the Roman Catholic mission.

== Event ==
The following day, a crowd gathered at the church. Directed by men in respectable attire, they torn down the walls, ransack the building and dug out graves, in search of murdered children, and money.

== Aftermath ==
A French gunboat arrived on the third day, followed by a British gunboat. The riot quelled, without death on both sides.

== See also ==
- Anti-missionary riots in China
