= Lawrence Bai Xiaoman =

Chinese Roman Catholic saint and martyr

Saint Lawrence Bai Xiaoman

Martyr
- Born: Guizhou, Qing China
- Died: 25 February 1856; Guangxi, Qing China
- Venerated in: Catholic Church
- Beatified: 1900 by Pope Leo XIII

Lawrence Bai Xiaoman
- Traditional Chinese: 白小滿
- Simplified Chinese: 白小满
Transcriptions
Standard Mandarin
- Hanyu Pinyin: Bái Xiǎomǎn
- Wade–Giles: Pai2 Hsiao3-man3

Lawrence Bai Xiaoman (traditional Chinese: 白小滿; simplified Chinese: 白小满; 1821–1856; Ecclesiastical Latin: Laurentius Bai Xiaoman) was a Catholic saint and martyr from Guizhou province, southwestern China.

== Life ==
Lawrence Bai Xiaoman was born in Guizhou to a poor family, and became an orphan at a young age. He went to Yaoshan in Xilin County, Guangxi to make a living as a domestic worker. He married in his 30s and had a daughter.

Augustus Chapdelaine, a French missionary went to Guangxi in the 1850s to preach the gospel. At this time, Christian missionaries were forbidden to enter the interior of China away from the treaty ports. Bai was baptized as a Catholic in 1855 and took the name 'Lawrence'. He became closely attached to Chapdelaine.

He was a Catholic for only a year before he was put to death. A the time, a bitter civil war was being fought in China between the Taiping rebels and the Qing government. The Taipings were Christians who believed that their leader Hong Xiuquan was the brother of Jesus Christ. The rebellion had started in Guangxi and the Qing armies massacred huge numbers of civilians in areas that were associated with the rebellion.

Chapdelaine was known in Guangxi for carrying out missionary activities in a way that offended traditional Chinese customs and culture, especially concerning ancestor worship. In addition, to defame Chapdelaine, locals accused him of having sexual relations with female Christians, a common way of slandering Christians, especially missionaries, at that time.

In 1856, Chapdelaine was arrested by Qing authorities and they decided to execute him rather than to deport him to one of the Chinese treaty ports where European missionaries were legally permitted to stay. Bai Xiaoman spoke out against his sentence and was arrested by the Qing authorities. Fifteen others were also arrested in association with this episode, including another saint named Agnes Tsao Kou Ying who was also put to death.

After his arrest, they demanded that Bai Xiaoman renounce his Christianity and he refused, so he was executed along with the others in Xilinxian. He was executed in front of his wife and child. Before being put to death he called for his wife to keep the Ten Commandments and to teach the faith to their child. He was beheaded on 25 February 1856 in Guangxi and his body was dumped in a wooded area for wild animals to eat.

He was declared Blessed by Pope Leo XIII in 1900. He is listed in the Martyrologium Romanum.

== Sources ==
- Saint Laurentius Bai Xiaoman
