= Marie Melchior Joseph Théodose de Lagrené =

French diplomat

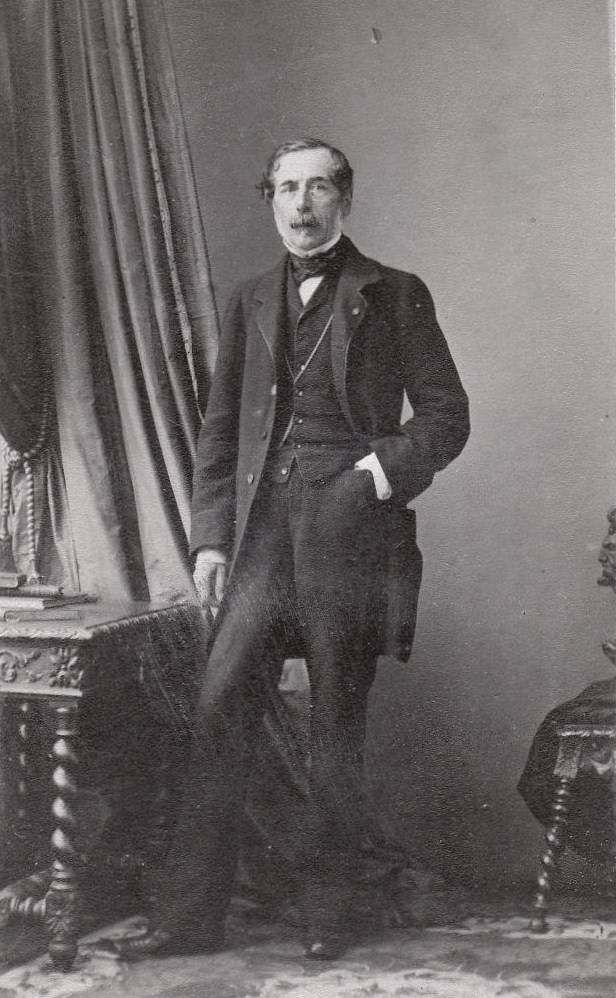
- Lagrené in 1861
- Born: 14 March 1800; Amiens, France
- Died: 26 February 1862 (aged 61); Paris, France

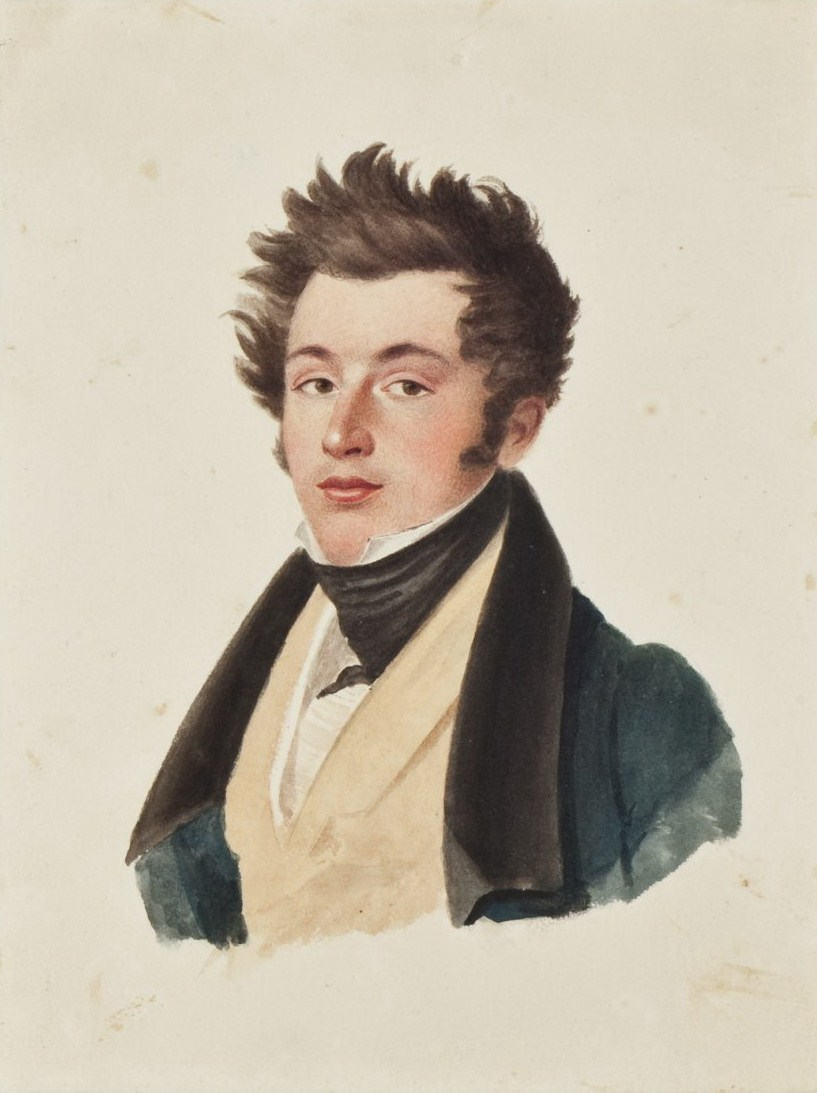
A portrait of Lagrené at a young age by Brian Searby

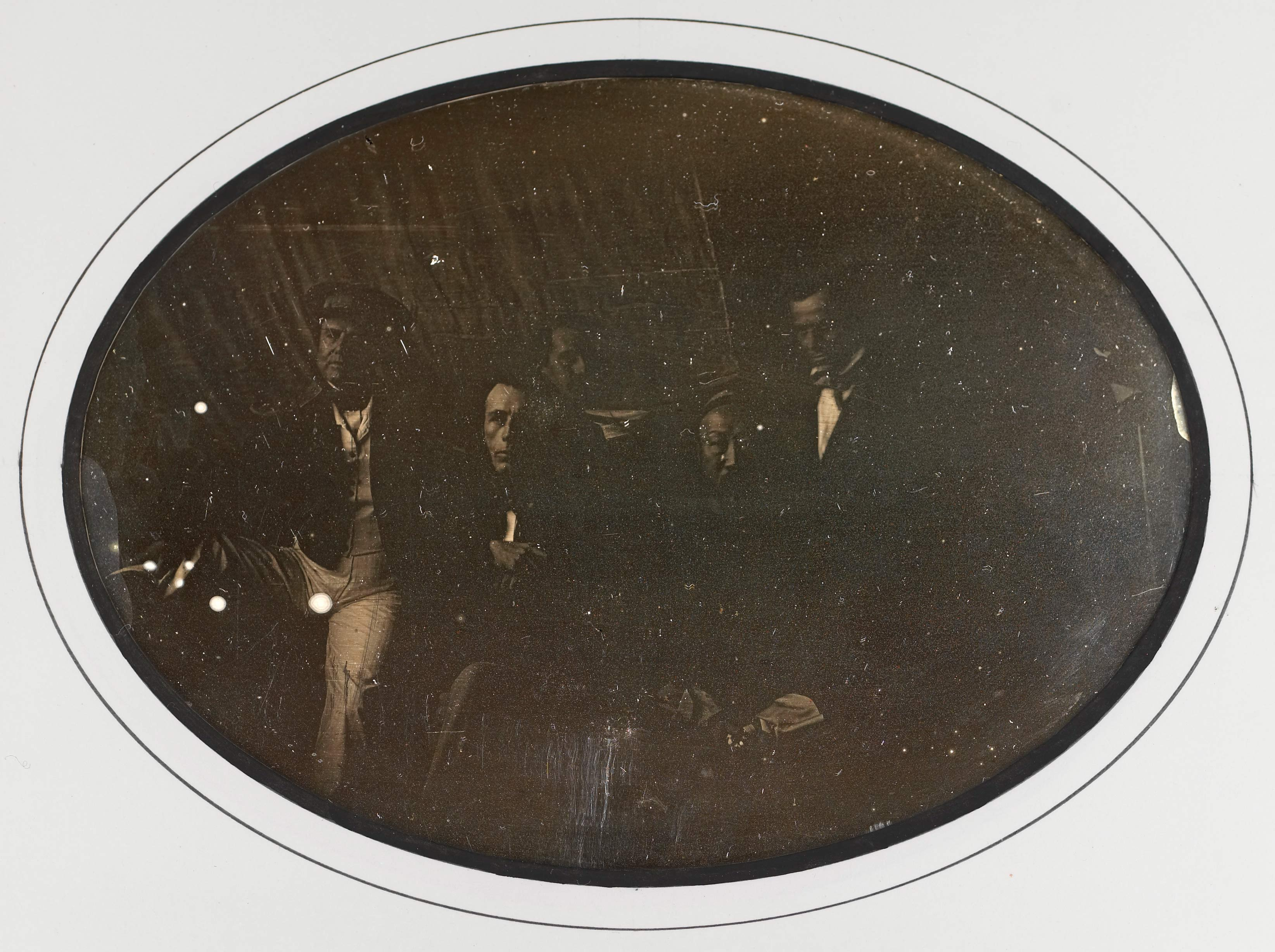
Lagrené (second from left) and Qiying (second from right) in 1844

Marie Melchior Joseph Théodose de Lagrené (14 March 1800, in Amiens – 26 January 1862, in Paris), was a French legislator and diplomat.

== Life ==
Marie was born in Amiens, France in 1800 and hailed from an old family originally from Picardy. He joined the French diplomatic service at a young age and served in the foreign ministry under Mathieu de Montmorency, accompanying him to the Congress of Verona in 1822. The following year, Lagrené became a diplomat at the French embassy in Russia and subsequently fulfilled the same function at the French embassy in Constantinople. In 1828, he obtained the rank of ambassador while serving at the French embassy in Madrid. Lagrené remained in office after the establishment of the July Monarchy in 1830 and he went on to hold a number of prominent positions in the French foreign service. He was sent to Athens as minister in 1836.

In 1843, King Louis Philippe sent Lagrené to China with the title of Envoy extraordinary and Minister Plenipotentiary of France. He was sent with the aim of concluding a commercial treaty to secure the same privileges as the Sino-British Treaty of Nanking. A Catholic, de Lagrené viewed the negotiation of the Treaty of Huangpu as an opportunity to improve the prestig of France and the Catholic Church through religious policy. He asked his Qing government counterpart, Qiying, to persuade the Daoguang Emperor to provide religious toleration for Catholics as a demonstration of goodwill for France. Hoping that doing so would create division between the French imperialists and the Protestant British imperialists, the Daoguang Emperor agreed.

The Treaty of Huangpu institutionalised benefits for French Catholics, including the ability to operate and establish religious institutions in the treaty ports, decriminalisation of Catholicism throughout China, and providing that any missionaries discovered by Chinese authorities outside the treaty ports should be escorted to a French consulate. De Lagrené negotiated an edict which the Daoguang Emperor issued in 1846 which reaffirmed the free exercise of Catholic religious practice, mandated punishment for Chinese officials who persecuted Catholics, and restored to local Catholics all church property seized since the Kangxi Emperor's ban on Christianity in the early 18th century. The result in the subsequent decades was that magistrates dealing with Catholics in China were required to negotiate with French officials and address both domestic law and treaty law. De Lagrené thus played a role in establishing the French religious protectorate in China.

After the fall of the July Monarchy in 1848, Lagrené left the government service, and in 1849 he was elected as the representative of the Somme in the French legislative assembly, where he consistently supported conservative causes, such as the restriction of the suffrage. Following Louis-Napoléon's coup d'état in 1851, Lagrené finally retired from public life.
