= Auguste Chapdelaine =

French Christian missionary

Saint Auguste Chapdelaine
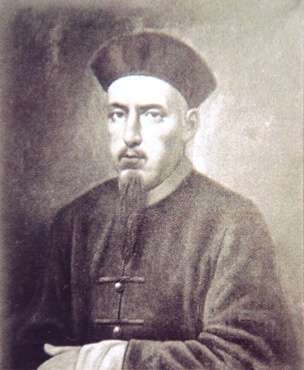
- Auguste Chapdelaine

Catholic Missionary
- Born: 6 January 1814; La Rochelle-Normande, French Empire
- Died: 29 February 1856 (aged 42); Guangxi, Qing China
- Venerated in: Catholic Church
- Canonized: 1 October 2000 by Pope John Paul II
- Feast: 28 February

Auguste Chapdelaine
- Traditional Chinese: 馬賴
- Simplified Chinese: 马赖
Transcriptions
Standard Mandarin
- Hanyu Pinyin: Mǎ Lài
- Wade–Giles: Ma3 Lai4

Auguste Chapdelaine, Chinese name Mǎ Lài (Chinese: 馬賴; 6 February 1814 – 29 February 1856) was a French Christian missionary of the Paris Foreign Missions Society. France used his death – Chapdelaine was executed by Chinese officials – as a casus belli for its participation in the Second Opium War.

== Biography ==
Chapdelaine was born on a farm in La Rochelle-Normande, France. By the age of twenty, he had entered the seminary at Coutances. He was ordained a priest for the diocese of Coutances in 1843 and in 1851 joined the Institute of Foreign Missions in Paris. He left from Antwerp in April 1852 to join the Catholic mission in the Guangxi province of China. The Taiping Rebellion led to suspicion of Christians, and foreigners were forbidden to enter the area.

After a stay in Guangzhou, he moved to Guiyang, capital of the Guizhou province, in the spring of 1854. In December, he went, together with Lu Tingmei, to Yaoshan village, Xilin County of Guangxi, where he met the local Catholic community of around 300 people. He celebrated his first mass there on 8 December 1854. He was arrested and thrown into the Xilin county prison ten days after his arrival and was released after sixteen or eighteen days of captivity.

Following personal threats, Chapdelaine returned to Guizhou in early 1855, and came back to Guangxi in December of the same year. He was denounced on 22 February 1856 by Bai San, a relative of a new convert, while the local tribunal was on holiday. He was arrested in Yaoshan, together with other Chinese Catholics, by orders of Zhang Mingfeng, the new local mandarin on 25 February 1856. Chapdelaine was accused of stirring up insurrection and refused to pay a bribe. Condemned to cage torture (zhanlong), he was first beaten one hundred times on the cheek by a leather thong, which caused his teeth to fly out, his face mutilated, and his jaw lacerated. He was locked into a small iron cage, which was hung at the gate of the jail. The planks he stood on were gradually removed, placing a strain in the muscles of the neck, and leading to a slow and painful death from suffocation. He had already died when he was decapitated. His head was hung from a tree by his hair. Children were said to have thrown stones at the head until it fell to the ground and was devoured by street dogs and hogs.

== Diplomacy ==
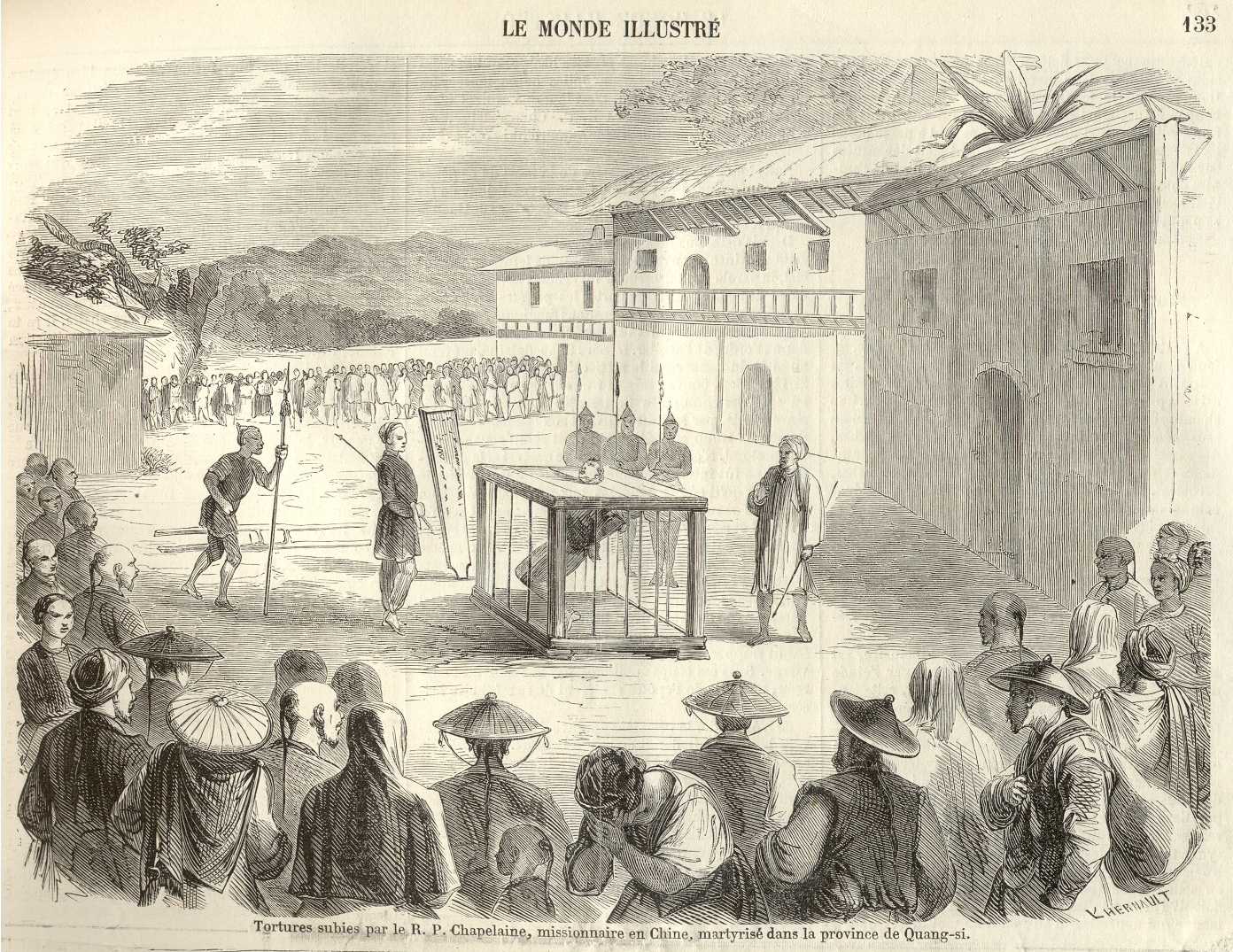
Martyrdom of Auguste Chapdelaine.

His death was reported by the head of the French missions in Hong Kong on 12 July. The chargé d'affaires, de Courcy, in Macau learned of the execution on 17 July and filed a vigorous protest on 25 July to the Chinese Imperial Viceroy Ye Mingchen. On 30 July, he sent a report to the French foreign office of the execution.

The viceroy responded to de Courcy by pointing out that Chapdelaine had already violated Chinese law by preaching Christianity in the interior (the 1844 treaty signed with France only permitted for the propagation of Christianity in the five treaty ports opened to the French). He also claimed that the priest was in a rebel territory and that many of his converts had already been arrested for acts of treason, and the viceroy further claimed that Chapdelaine's mission had nothing in common with the propagation of religion.

Under French diplomatic pressure, the mandarin who ordered his death was later demoted. When Britain went to war with China in the same year (commencing the Second Opium War (1856–1860)), France initially declared its neutrality, but de Courcy made it known that French sympathy was with the British due to the Chapdelaine incident.

In 1857, de Bourboulon, the French plenipotentiary, arrived in Hong Kong and attempted to negotiate reparations for the execution of Chapdelaine and to revise the treaty. He failed to reach an agreement with Yeh.

Talks continued into December of that year. Viceroy Yeh on 14 December stated that he had received a report that the person who was killed was a member of a triad society with a similar Chinese name to Chapdelaine was executed as a rebel in March, and that this was not the same person as Chapdelaine. He also complained that in the past many French citizens had gone into the interior to preach, and he cited the case of six missionaries who had been arrested and were handed over to French custody. The French embassy found Yeh's reply to be evasive, derisory and a formal refusal of French demands.

== The Second Opium War ==
According to historian Anthony Clark, "there is no doubt Chapdelaine's death was exploited for imperialist gain". The French Empire had many times suffered the death of missionaries for which no military vengeance occurred. The political situation wherein Britain's victory was seen as inevitable and the French desire to make its own imperial gains in China, alongside the fact that the French did not have a policy elsewhere of punitive military expeditions to avenge the death of missionaries, has led many historians to conclude that the death of Chapdelaine was merely an excuse used in order to declare war so that France could build its empire.

Lord Elgin, the British High Commissioner for China commented on the French ultimatum given prior to France's entry to the war:

Gros [the French ambassador] showed me a projet de note [draft note] when I called on him some days ago. It is very long and very well written. The fact is, that he has had a much better case of quarrel than we; at least one that lends itself much better to rhetoric.

The Chinese version of Article Six in the Sino-French Peking Convention, signed at the end of the war, gave Christians the right to spread their faith in China and to French missionaries to hold property.

== Recognition and controversy ==
Chapdelaine was beatified in 1900. He was canonized on 1 October 2000, by Pope John Paul II, together with 120 Christian martyrs who had died in China between the 17th and 20th centuries.

Anthony Clark maintains that China's version of history is "largely contrived" and completely unsupported, and that notions that Chapdelaine was "a lascivious womanizer" and spy are "unsupportable in any historical records".

== See also ==
- Lawrence Bai Xiaoman
