= Treaty of Whampoa =

1844 treaty between France and China

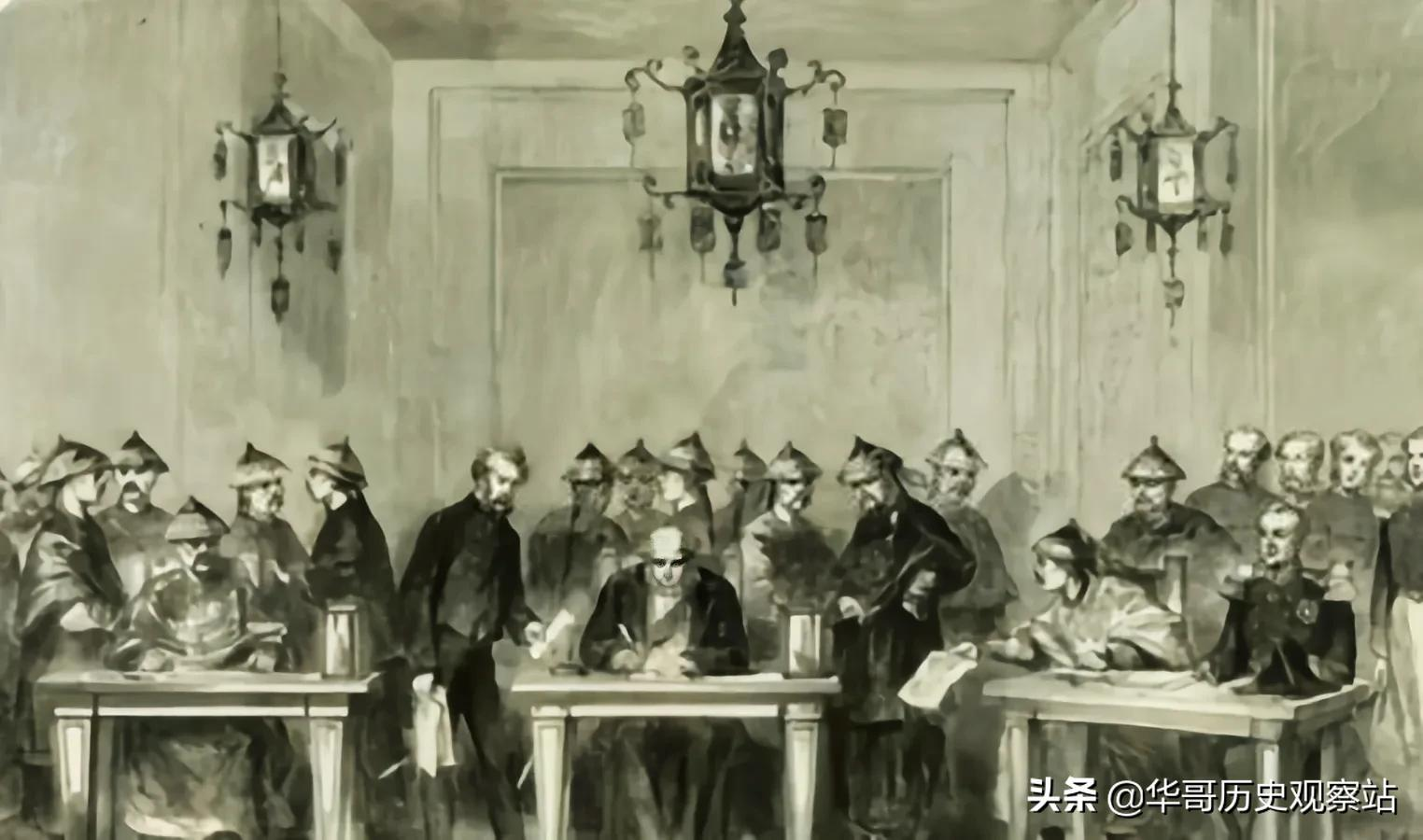
- Signing of the treaty by Theodoré de Lagrené and Keying
- Type: Unequal treaty
- Signed: 24 October 1844
- Location: Whampoa, British Hong Kong
- Signatories: (Qing dynasty) Keying; (Second French Empire) Theodoré de Lagrené
- Parties: Qing dynasty; (Second French Empire) France

The Treaty of Whampoa (simplified Chinese: 黄埔条约; traditional Chinese: 黃埔條約; pinyin: Huángpǔ Tiáoyuē; Cantonese Yale: Wòhngbou Tìuhyeuk) was an unequal treaty between the Kingdom of France and the Qing dynasty of China, which was signed by Qiying and Théodore de Lagrené on October 24, 1844, aboard the warship L’Archimède.

== Terms ==
China was to grant the same privileges to the Kingdom of France as to Britain in the Treaty of Nanking and subsequent treaties. The privileges included the opening of five harbours to French merchants, extraterritorial privileges French citizens in China, a fixed tariff on Sino-French trade and the right of France to station consuls in China.

The treaty institutionalised benefits for French Catholics, including the ability to operate and establish religious institutions in the treaty ports, decriminalisation of Catholicism throughout China, and providing that any missionaries discovered by Chinese authorities outside the treaty ports should be escorted to a French consulate.

== Toleration of Christianity ==
Marie Melchior Joseph Théodose de Lagrené negotiated the treaty on the French side. A Catholic, de Lagrené viewed the negotiation of the Treaty as an opportunity to improve the prestige of France and the Catholic Church through religious policy. He asked his Qing government counterpart, Qiying, to persuade the Daoguang Emperor to provide religious toleration for Catholics as a demonstration of goodwill for France. Hoping that doing so would create division between the French imperialists and the Protestant British imperialists, the Daoguang Emperor agreed. These provisions and subsequent developments formed the French justification for the French religious protectorate in China.

== See also ==
- Imperialism in Asia
- Convention of Peking
