= Tianlin County =

Tianlin 田林县 · Denzlinz Yen
- County
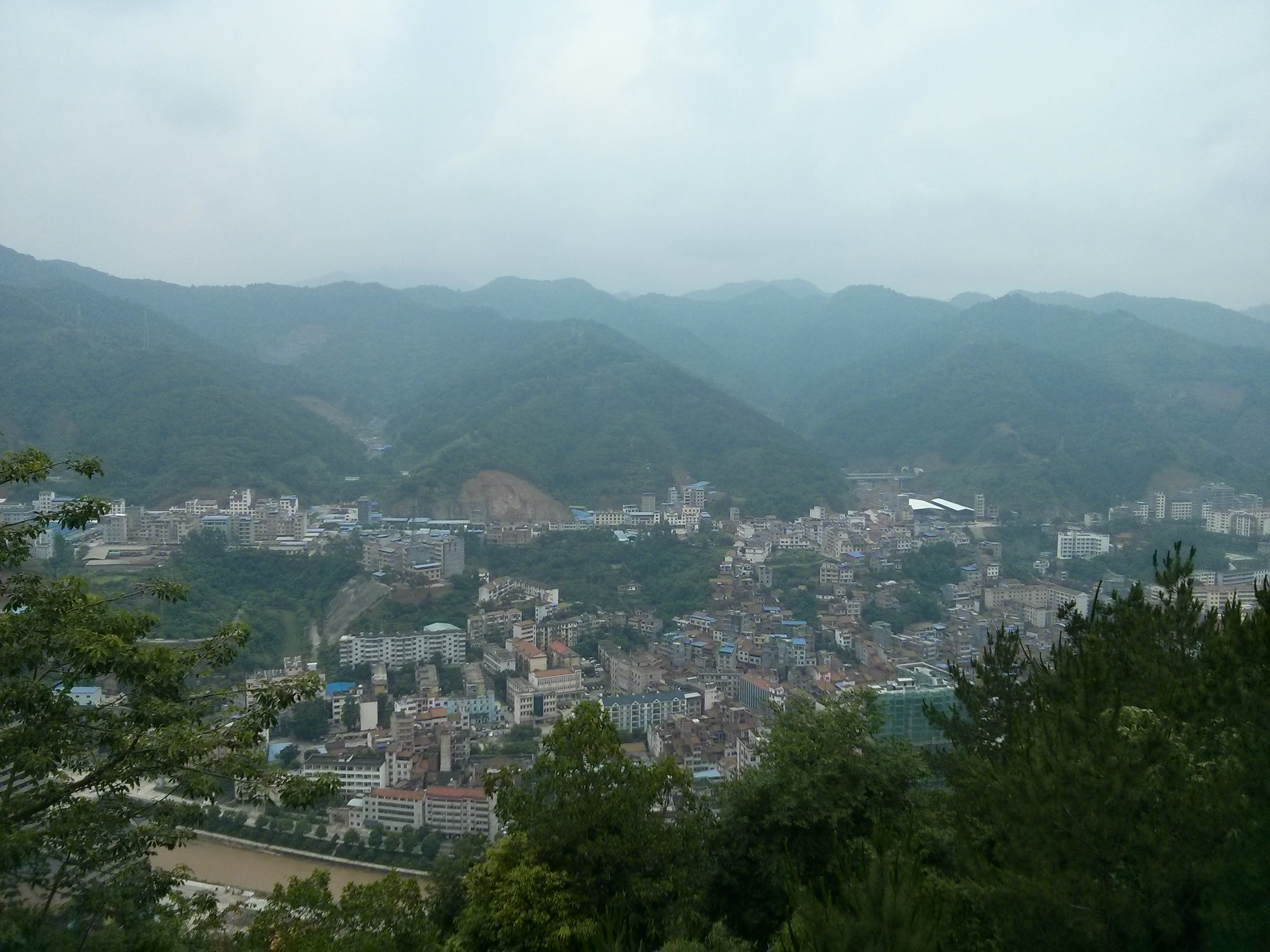

- Location of the seat in Guangxi
- Coordinates: 24°17′38″N 106°13′44″E
- Country: China
- Province: Guangxi
- Prefecture-level city: Baise
- County seat: Leli

Area
  - Total: 5,584 km^{2} (2,156 sq mi)

Population (2020)
  - Total: 224,828
  - Density: 40.26/km^{2} (104.3/sq mi)
- Time zone: UTC+8 (China Standard)
- Postal code: 533300
- Website: www.tianlin.gov.cn

Tianlin County (Chinese: 田林县; pinyin: Tiánlín Xiàn; Zhuang: Denzlinz Yen) is a county in the west of Guangxi, China, bordering the provinces of Guizhou to the north and Yunnan to the south. It is under the administration of the prefecture-level city of Baise.

== Geography ==
Tianlin County borders Lingyun County and Leye County to the east, Funing County, Yunnan to the south, Xilin County and Longlin County to the west and Ceheng County, Guizhou to the north.

== Administrative divisions ==
Tianlin County is divided into 5 towns, 5 townships and 4 ethnic townships:

towns

- Leli Town 乐里镇
- Jiuzhou Town 旧州镇
- Ding'an Town 定安镇
- Liulong Town 六隆镇
- Langping Town 浪平镇

townships

- Pingtang Township 平塘乡
- Nabi Township 那比乡
- Gaolong Township 高龙乡
- Baile Township 百乐乡
- Zhemiao Township 者苗乡

ethnic townships

- Lucheng Yao Ethnic Township 潞城瑶族乡
- Lizhou Yao Ethnic Township 利周瑶族乡
- Bagui Yao Ethnic Township 八桂瑶族乡
- Badu Yao Ethnic Township 八渡瑶族乡

== Demographics ==
Ethnic Yao are distributed mostly in the townships of Lizhou 利周, Lucheng 潞城, Bagui 八桂, Nongwa 弄瓦, Fuda 福达, and Badu 八渡, while ethnic Yi are found in Changjing Village 常井村 of Ding'an Township 定安镇.

The Miao of Tianlin County call themselves "Mengxia 孟夏", while the Zhuang call themselves Puyue 甫越 (bu33 jui33), the Han call themselves Kebianren 客边人 ('guest people'), and the Yi call themselves Buna 布那.

=== Yao ===
The Yao of Tianlin County consist of the following four subgroups.

- Landian Yao 蓝靛瑶 (autonym: Qinmen 琴门, meaning 'mountain people' 山人)
- Pangu Yao 盘古瑶 (autonym: Yumian 育棉)
- Beilou Yao 背篓瑶 (autonym: Bunu 布努)
- Mubing Yao 木柄瑶 (autonym: Nuomo 诺莫)

== Notable people ==
- Li Jinfang (ethnic Zhuang): linguist at the Minzu University of China

== Climate ==
Climate data for Tianlin, elevation 278 m (912 ft), (1991–2020 normals, extremes 1981–2010)
Month	Jan	Feb	Mar	Apr	May	Jun	Jul	Aug	Sep	Oct	Nov	Dec	Year
Record high °C (°F)	30.0 (86.0)	35.5 (95.9)	37.4 (99.3)	40.0 (104.0)	40.2 (104.4)	37.5 (99.5)	37.5 (99.5)	37.5 (99.5)	38.0 (100.4)	34.0 (93.2)	33.5 (92.3)	30.2 (86.4)	40.2 (104.4)
Mean daily maximum °C (°F)	17.3 (63.1)	20.3 (68.5)	24.1 (75.4)	28.9 (84.0)	31.1 (88.0)	32.1 (89.8)	32.7 (90.9)	32.9 (91.2)	31.1 (88.0)	27.4 (81.3)	23.9 (75.0)	19.2 (66.6)	26.7 (80.2)
Daily mean °C (°F)	12.4 (54.3)	14.8 (58.6)	18.4 (65.1)	22.9 (73.2)	25.5 (77.9)	26.9 (80.4)	27.3 (81.1)	26.9 (80.4)	25.0 (77.0)	21.7 (71.1)	17.7 (63.9)	13.5 (56.3)	21.1 (69.9)
Mean daily minimum °C (°F)	9.4 (48.9)	11.3 (52.3)	14.6 (58.3)	18.6 (65.5)	21.4 (70.5)	23.6 (74.5)	24.1 (75.4)	23.6 (74.5)	21.6 (70.9)	18.5 (65.3)	14.2 (57.6)	10.1 (50.2)	17.6 (63.7)
Record low °C (°F)	0.0 (32.0)	1.8 (35.2)	2.0 (35.6)	9.3 (48.7)	11.5 (52.7)	16.0 (60.8)	17.5 (63.5)	18.0 (64.4)	13.9 (57.0)	7.9 (46.2)	3.2 (37.8)	−1.6 (29.1)	−1.6 (29.1)
Average precipitation mm (inches)	23.4 (0.92)	19.1 (0.75)	34.2 (1.35)	72.4 (2.85)	156.3 (6.15)	247.2 (9.73)	224.6 (8.84)	197.7 (7.78)	103.4 (4.07)	66.0 (2.60)	33.5 (1.32)	21.9 (0.86)	1,199.7 (47.22)
Average precipitation days (≥ 0.1 mm)	7.6	8.1	9.0	10.2	12.8	15.4	17.8	16.2	10.8	8.9	7.0	6.4	130.2
Average snowy days	0.1	0	0	0	0	0	0	0	0	0	0	0.1	0.2
Average relative humidity (%)	80	77	75	75	77	82	83	83	82	82	81	80	80
Mean monthly sunshine hours	67.2	81.6	103.5	142.6	164.8	148.2	168.8	179.8	153.5	116.4	117.2	92.3	1,535.9
Percentage possible sunshine	20	25	28	37	40	36	41	45	42	33	36	28	34
Source: China Meteorological Administration
