= Ussuri krai =

Part of Primorsky Krai

Coordinates: 44.0000°N 133.0000°E

Ussuri krai (Russian: Уссури́йский край) is an unofficial name for a part of Primorsky Krai and Khabarovsky Krai that consisted of the Ussuri and South-Ussuri Okrugs. The name was often used in the late Russian Empire. The name comes from the fact that Ussuri River is located on the territory of the krai.

Through the efforts of the Russian governor Nikolay Muravyov-Amursky, the Qing dynasty of China conceded its rights to the territory to Russia in the Amur Annexation. This decision was officially documented in the Aigun Treaty (1858) and the Convention of Peking (1860).

In 1889–1918, Ussuri krai was the location of the Ussuri Cossack Host. It was re-established in the 1990s.

National Geographic Channel represented the film named "Secret Forest" as the part of the cycle Wild Russia, which describes the natural reserves of Ussuri Krai.
