= Opium Wars =

19th-century conflicts between China and European powers

Opium War
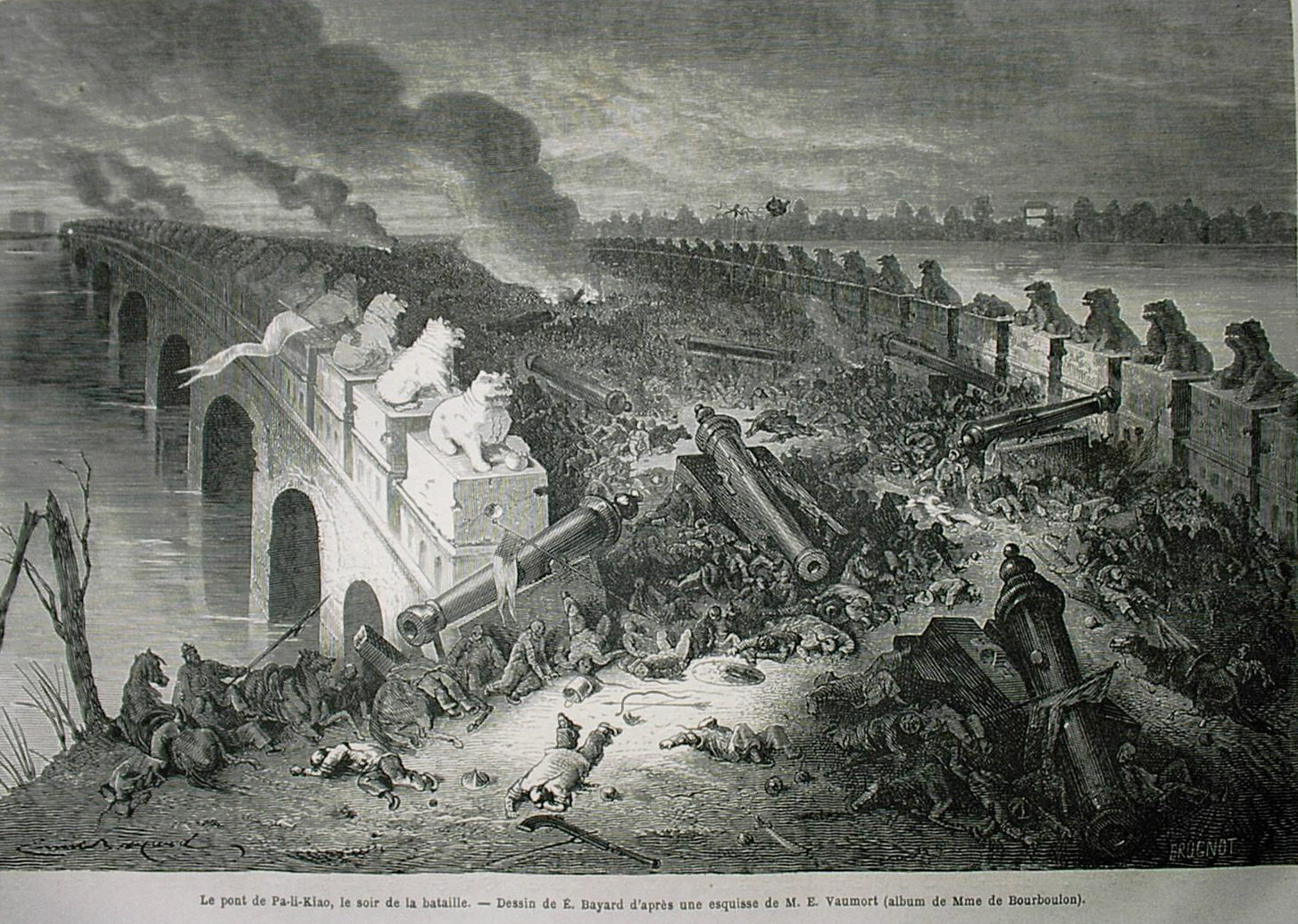
- Naval battle in the First Opium War (left), Battle of Palikao (right)
Date	First Opium War: 4 September 1839 – 29 August 1842; Second Opium War: 8 October 1856 – 24 October 1860
Location	China
Result	First Opium War: British victory Treaty of Nanking; Second Opium War: Anglo-French victory; Treaty of Tientsin; Convention of Peking
Territorial changes	First Opium War: Hong Kong ceded to Britain; Second Opium War: Kowloon Peninsula and Stonecutters Island ceded to British Hong Kong; Outer Manchuria ceded to Russia

Belligerents
First Opium War: (United Kingdom of Great Britain and Ireland) United Kingdom; East India Company; Second Opium War: British Empire; Second French Empire	Qing Dynasty

The Opium Wars (simplified Chinese: 鸦片战争; traditional Chinese: 鴉片戰爭; pinyin: Yāpiàn zhànzhēng) were two conflicts waged between the Qing dynasty and the Western powers during the mid-19th century.

The First Opium War was fought from 1839 to 1842 between China and the British Empire. It was triggered by the Qing government's campaign to enforce its prohibition of opium, which included destroying opium stocks owned by British merchants and the British East India Company. The British government responded by sending a naval expedition to force the Chinese government to pay reparations and allow the opium trade. The Second Opium War was waged by Britain and France against China from 1856 to 1860, and resulted in China being forced to legalise opium.

In the wars, the military advantages enjoyed by Europeans led to several easy victories over the Chinese military and China was compelled to sign the unequal treaties to grant favourable tariffs, trade concessions, reparations and territory to Western powers. The two conflicts, along with the treaties imposed during the century of humiliation, weakened Chinese sovereignty and forced China to open treaty ports (including Shanghai) to Western merchants. China ceded sovereignty over Hong Kong to the British in 1841, which maintained control over the region until 1997. These developments later became central to Nationalist narratives in China and were cited by movements such as the Chinese Communist Party to legitimize efforts to restore sovereignty and resist foreign influence.

== History ==
=== First Opium War ===
The First Opium War broke out in 1839 between China and Britain and was fought over trading rights (including the right of free trade) and Britain's diplomatic status among Chinese officials. In the eighteenth century, China enjoyed a trade surplus with Europe, trading porcelain, silk, and tea in exchange for silver. Trade between China and Britain was heavily imbalanced in China's favor. As Britain's demands for tea, silk, and porcelain exceeded Chinese demands for British goods, British merchants started exporting opium in India. This shift reversed the balance of trade. By the late 18th century, the British East India Company (EIC) expanded the cultivation of opium in the Bengal Presidency, selling it to private merchants who transported it to China and covertly sold it on to Chinese smugglers. At the time, foreign trade was restricted under the Canton System, limiting western merchants to a single port and conducting business through specific licensed Chinese merchants. By 1797, the EIC was selling 4,000 chests of opium a year (each weighing 77 kilograms or 170 pounds) to private merchants; that is, 308 tonnes (680 thousand pounds) per year.

In earlier centuries, opium was utilised as a medicine with anesthetic qualities, but new Chinese practices of smoking opium recreationally increased demand tremendously and led to smokers developing addictions. Successive Chinese emperors issued edicts making opium illegal in 1729, 1799, 1814, and 1831, but imports grew as smugglers and colluding officials in China sought profit. Some American merchants entered the trade by smuggling opium from Turkey into China, including Warren Delano Jr. and Francis Blackwell Forbes; in American historiography this is sometimes referred to as the Old China Trade. By 1833, the Chinese opium trade soared to 30,000 chests, that is, 2,310 tonnes (5.1 million pounds). The trade led to a "silver drainage" within the Chinese economy, essentially counteracting some of the gains from the Silk Road Trades.

British and American merchants sent opium to warehouses in the free-trade port of Canton, and sold it to Chinese smugglers.

In 1834, the EIC's monopoly on British trade with China ceased, and the opium trade burgeoned. Partly concerned with moral issues over the consumption of opium and partly with the outflow of silver, the Daoguang Emperor charged Governor General Lin Zexu with ending the trade. In addition to concerns about silver outflow, the Qing government viewed opium as a serious social and moral threat to Chinese society. Widespread addiction weakened the workforce, reduced productivity, and contributed to corruption among government officials who participated in illegal trade. Confucianism strongly emphasized social order and moral order; opium use was seen as something that went against these values. The Daoguang Emperor and his officials believed that banning opium was necessary in order to protect their stability and well-being. Ultimately, enforcement efforts focused on economic impacts, public health, and morality. In 1839, Lin published in Canton an open letter to Queen Victoria requesting her cooperation in halting the opium trade. The letter never reached the queen. It was later published in The Times as a direct appeal to the British public for their cooperation. An edict from the Daoguang Emperor followed on 18 March, emphasising the serious penalties for opium smuggling that would now apply henceforth. Lin ordered the seizure of all opium in Canton, including that held by foreign governments and trading companies (called factories), and the companies prepared to hand over a token amount to placate him. Charles Elliot, Chief Superintendent of British Trade in China, arrived 3 days after the expiry of Lin's deadline, as Chinese troops enforced a shutdown and blockade of the factories. The standoff ended after Elliot paid for all the opium on credit from the British government (despite lacking official authority to make the purchase) and handed the 20,000 chests (with 1,300 tonnes or 2.9 million pounds) over to Lin, who had them destroyed at Humen.

Elliot then wrote to London advising the use of military force to resolve the dispute with the Chinese government. A small skirmish occurred between British and Chinese warships in the Kowloon Estuary on 4 September 1839. After almost a year, the British government decided, in May 1840, to send a military expedition to impose reparations for the financial losses experienced by opium traders in Canton and to guarantee future security for the trade. On 21 June 1840, a British naval force arrived off Macao and moved to bombard the port of Dinghai. In the ensuing conflict, the Royal Navy used its superior ships and guns to inflict a series of decisive defeats on Chinese forces.

The war was concluded by the Treaty of Nanking (Nanjing) in 1842, the first of the Unequal treaties between China and Western powers. The treaty ceded the Hong Kong Island and surrounding smaller islands to Britain, and established five cities as treaty ports open to Western traders: Shanghai, Canton, Ningbo, Fuzhou, and Xiamen (Amoy). The treaty also stipulated that China would pay a twenty-one million dollar payment to Britain as reparations for the destroyed opium, with six million to be paid immediately, and the rest through specified installments thereafter. Another treaty the following year gave most favoured nation status to Britain and added provisions for British extraterritoriality, making Britain exempt from Chinese law. France secured several of the same concessions from China in the Treaty of Whampoa in 1844.

Historian Xin Zhang argues that the economic changes associated with the first Opium War also depended on developments already under way within China, The opening of Shanghai to foreign trade, alongside the deterioration of the Grand Canal, helped shift commerce towards routes connecting the Yangzi River with the coast. Shanghai consequently became a hub linking inland trade with overseas markets.

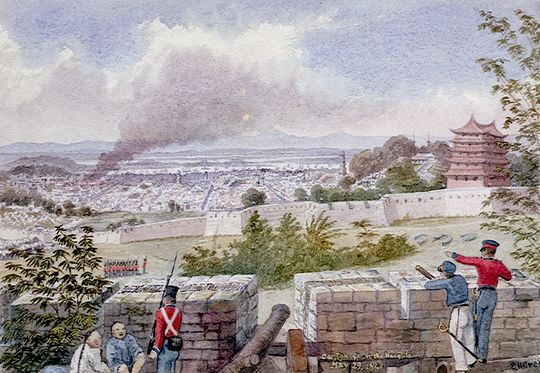
British bombardment of Canton from the surrounding heights, 29 May 1841. Watercolour painting by Edward H. Cree (1814–1901), Naval Surgeon to the Royal Navy

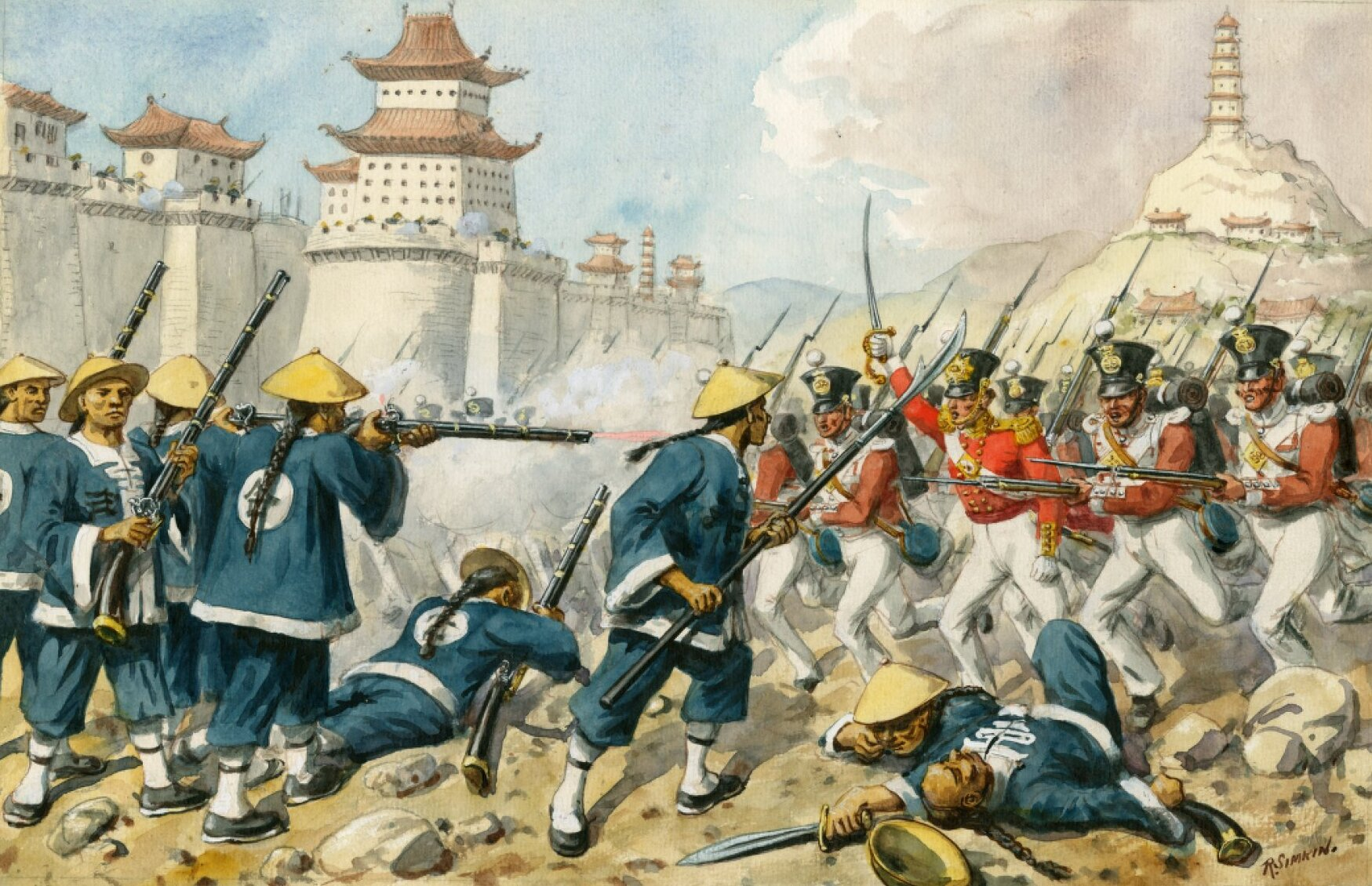
The 98th Regiment of Foot at the attack on Chin-Kiang-Foo (Zhenjiang), 21 July 1842, resulting in the defeat of the Manchu government. Watercolour by military illustrator Richard Simkin (1840–1926)

=== Second Opium War ===
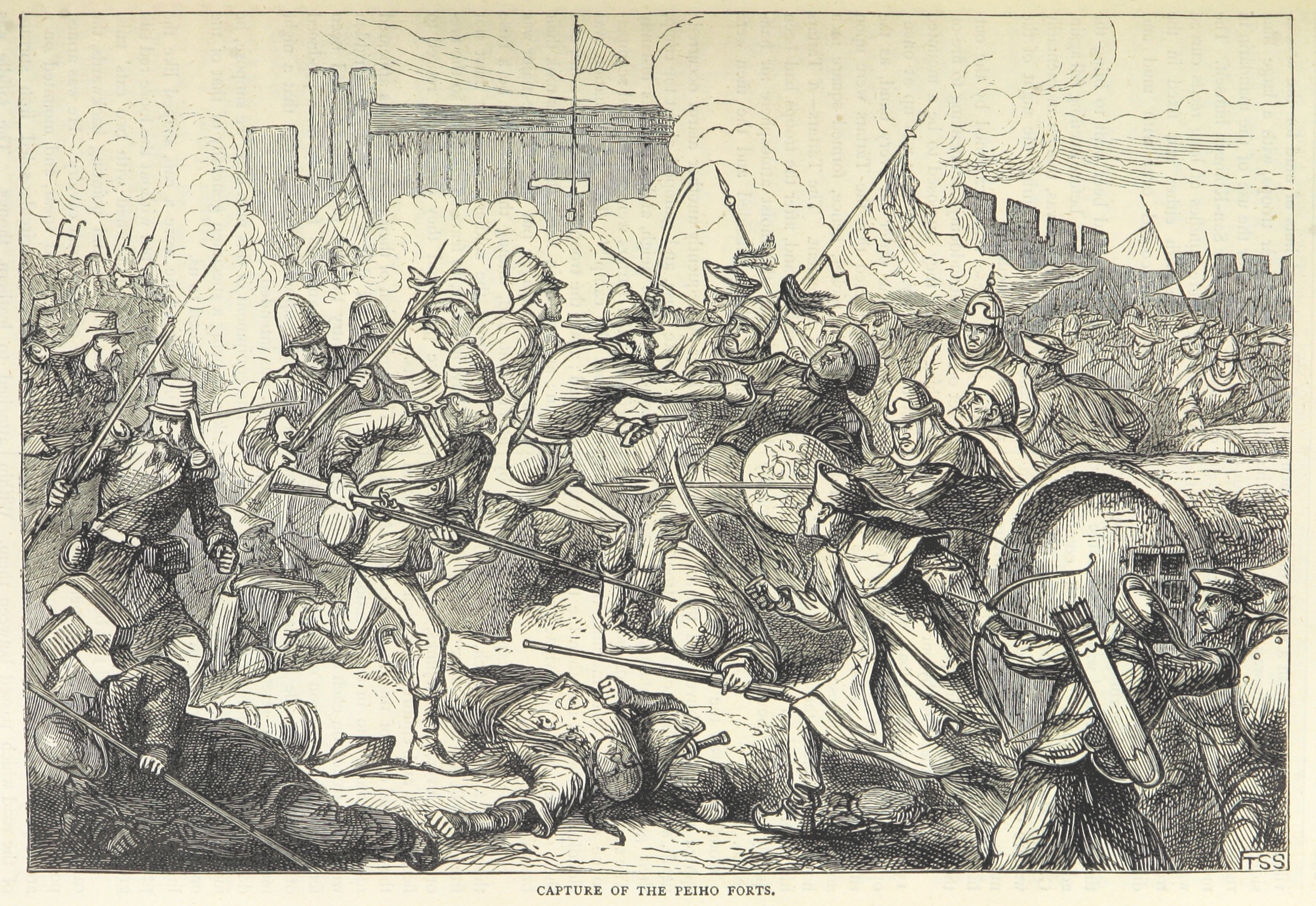
Depiction of the 1860 battle of Taku Forts. Book illustration from 1873.

In 1853, northern China was convulsed by the Taiping Rebellion, which established its capital at Nanjing. In spite of this, a new Imperial Commissioner, Ye Mingchen, was appointed at Canton, determined to stamp out the opium trade, which was still technically illegal. On 8 October 1856, Chinese authorities boarded the Chinese-owned Arrow at Canton and detained twelve crew members. The vessel's Hong Kong registration had expired eleven days earlier. British officials protested that the British flag had been lowered during the boarding, but accounts differed over whether a flag had been flying. He seized the Arrow, a ship claiming British registration, and threw its crew into chains. Sir John Bowring, Governor of British Hong Kong, called up Rear Admiral Sir Michael Seymour's East Indies and China Station fleet, which, on 23 October, bombarded and captured the Pearl River forts on the approach to Canton and proceeded to bombard Canton itself, but had insufficient forces to take and hold the city. On 15 December, during a riot in Canton, European commercial properties were set on fire and Bowring appealed for military intervention. The execution of a French missionary inspired support from France. The United States and Russia also became involved in the conflict, primarily through diplomatic efforts, and later obtained similar concessions from China through treaties such as the Treaty of Tientsin.

Britain and France now sought greater concessions from China, including the legalization of the opium trade, expanding of the transportation of labourers (pejoratively called coolies) to European colonies, opening all of China to British and French citizens and exempting foreign imports from internal transit duties. The war resulted in the 1858 Treaty of Tientsin (Tianjin), in which the Chinese government agreed to pay war reparations for the expenses of the recent conflict, open a second group of ten ports to European commerce, legalize the opium trade, and grant foreign traders and missionaries rights to travel within China.

China was also required to use diplomacy in the Western, egalitarian style instead of their normal way of conducting business with lesser states through a tribute system. This treaty led to the era in Chinese history known as the Century of Humiliation. This term refers to China's loss of control of many territories to its enemies after being forced into treaties which they considered unfair. China's defeat in the Opium Wars was a sign that the Chinese state's legitimacy and ability to project power were weakening which also contributed to this era. Even though the treaties were signed in 1858, there was still Chinese resistance to its principles including the residence of foreign ambassadors in Beijing. The British continued to attack the Chinese. After a second phase of fighting which included the sack of the Old Summer Palace and the occupation of the Forbidden City palace complex in Beijing, the treaty was confirmed by the Convention of Peking in 1860.

=== Cultural relics ===
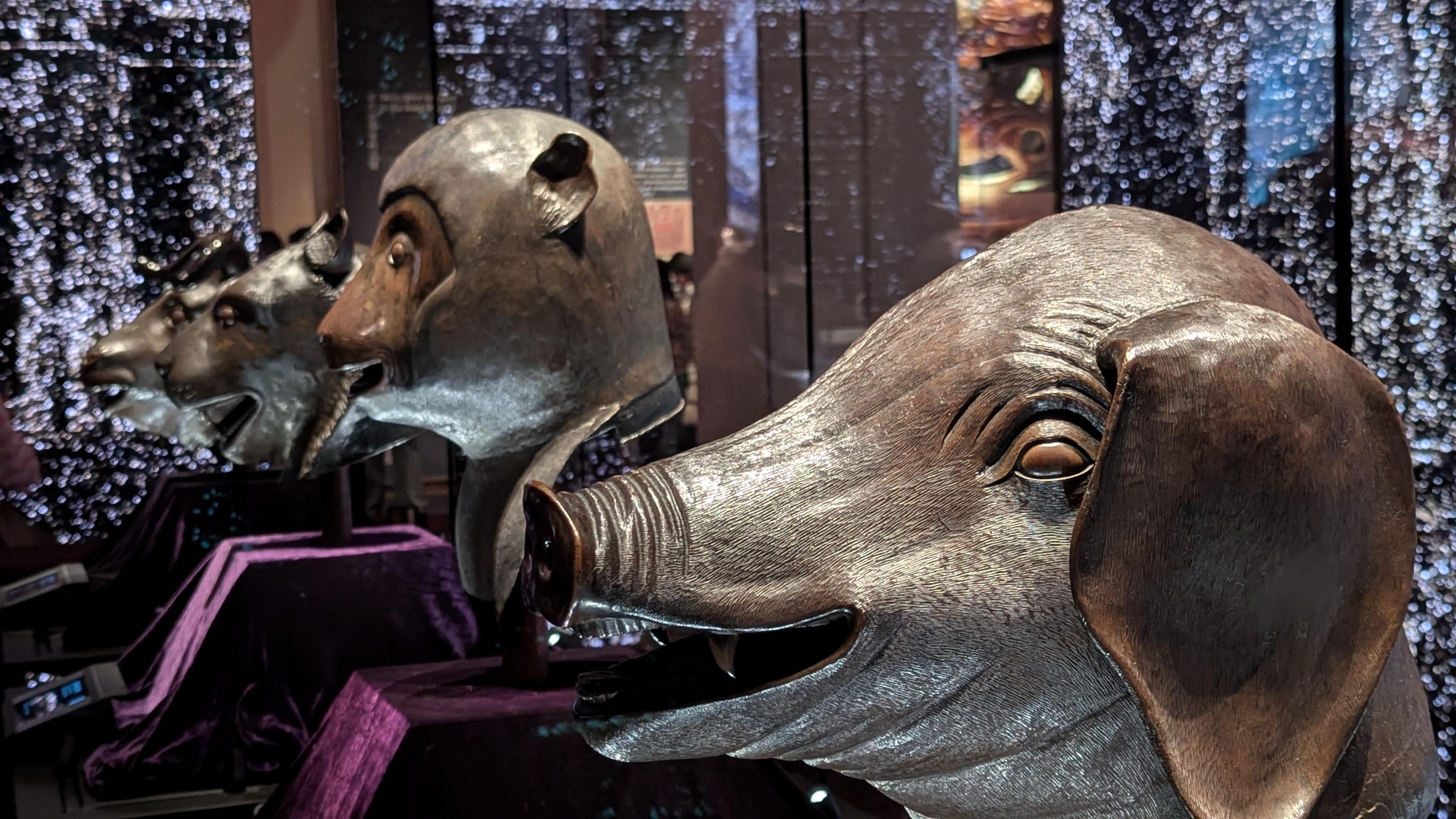
Four of the original Old Summer Palace bronze heads on display in the Poly MGM Museum

In February 1860, the British and French imperialist authorities again appointed Elgin and Grotto as plenipotentiaries respectively, leading more than 15,000 British troops and about 7,000 French troops to expand the war against China. The British and French forces invaded Beijing, and the Qing emperor fled to Chengde. The British and French forces broke into the Old Summer Palace, looted jewelry, and burned it. Among the cultural relics that were looted were the well-known Old Summer Palace bronze heads.

On the morning of 7 October, the French army broke into the Old Summer Palace and began to rob it. British soldiers who arrived in the afternoon also joined the robbery, and the most precious things in the Old Summer Palace were looted. All twelve bronze statues of animal heads began to be lost overseas. On 18 October, the Old Summer Palace was burned down by British soldiers, and France refused to provide aid. The fire burned for three days and nights, razing the buildings of the Old Summer Palace to the ground and destroying nearby royal properties.

As of December 2020, seven of the twelve bronze statues have been found and returned to China. The whereabouts of the remaining five are still unknown.

== See also ==
- Destruction of opium at Humen
- History of opium in China
- Russia in the Opium Wars
- Sino-French War

== Cited references and further reading ==
- Beeching, Jack (1975). The Chinese Opium Wars. London: Hutchinson. ISBN 978-0-09-122730-2.
- Fay, Peter Ward (1975). The Opium War, 1840–1842: Barbarians in the Celestial Empire in the Early Part of the Nineteenth Century and the War by Which They Forced Her Gates Ajar. Chapel Hill: University of North Carolina Press. ISBN 978-0-8078-1243-3.
- Gelber, H. (2004). Opium, Soldiers and Evangelicals: England's 1840-42 War with China and Its Aftermath. London: Palgrave Macmillan UK. ISBN 978-0-230-00070-4.
- Hanes, W. Travis III; Sanello, Frank (2004). Opium Wars: The Addiction of One Empire and the Corruption of Another. Naperville: Sourcebooks. ISBN 978-1-4022-2969-5.
- Haythornthwaite, Philip J. (2000). The Colonial Wars Source Book. London. ISBN 1-84067-231-5.
- Inglis, Brian (1976). The Opium War. London: Hodder & Stoughton. ISBN 0-340-19390-5.
- Kaufman, Alison A. (10 March 2011). The 'Century of Humiliation' and China's National Narratives (PDF) (Report).
- Kitson, Peter J. (Summer 2018). "The Last War of the Romantics: De Quincey, Macaulay, the First Chinese Opium War" (PDF). The Wordsworth Circle. 49 (3): 148–158. doi:10.1086/TWC4903148. ISSN 0043-8006. JSTOR 45213713.
- Lovell, Julia (2011). The Opium War: Drugs, Dreams and the Making of China. London: Picador. ISBN 978-0-330-45747-7. OCLC 730402956.
- Marchant, Leslie (May 2002). "The Wars of the Poppies". History Today. Vol. 52, no. 5. pp. 42–49.
- Platt, Stephen R. (2018). Imperial Twilight: The Opium War and the End of China's Last Golden Age. New York: Alfred A. Knopf. ISBN 978-0-307-96173-0.
  - Pomeranz, Kenneth (6 June 2019). "Blundering into War". The New York Review of Books. Vol. 66, no. 10. pp. 38–41. ISSN 0028-7504.
- Polachek, James M. (1992). The Inner Opium War. Harvard East Asian monographs. Cambridge, Mass: Harvard University Asia Center. ISBN 978-0-674-45446-0.
- Wakeman, Frederic Evans (1997) [1966]. Strangers at the Gate: Social Disorder in South China, 1839-1861. Berkeley: University of California Press. ISBN 978-0-520-21239-8.
- "The Opening to China Part II: the Second Opium War, the United States, and the Treaty of Tianjin, 1857–1859". Office of the Historian. US Department of State.
- Waley, Arthur (1958). The Opium War Through Chinese Eyes. London: George Allen & Unwin.
- Wang, Helen (2023). Wang, H.; Bracey, R. (eds.). "The Canton Ransom – What Happened to the Six Million Dollars of Silver?". Look at the Coins. Papers in honour of Joe Cribb on his 75th Birthday. Oxford: Archaeopress: 58–69.
- Wong, J. Y. (2002). Deadly Dreams: Opium and the Arrow War (1856-1860) in China. Cambridge studies in Chinese history, literature and institutions. Cambridge: Cambridge University Press. ISBN 978-0-521-52619-7.
- Yu, Miles Maochun (3 July 2018). "Did China Have A Chance To Win The Opium War?". Military History in the News. Hoover Institution.
