= Amur Annexation =

Russian annexation of Outer Manchuria

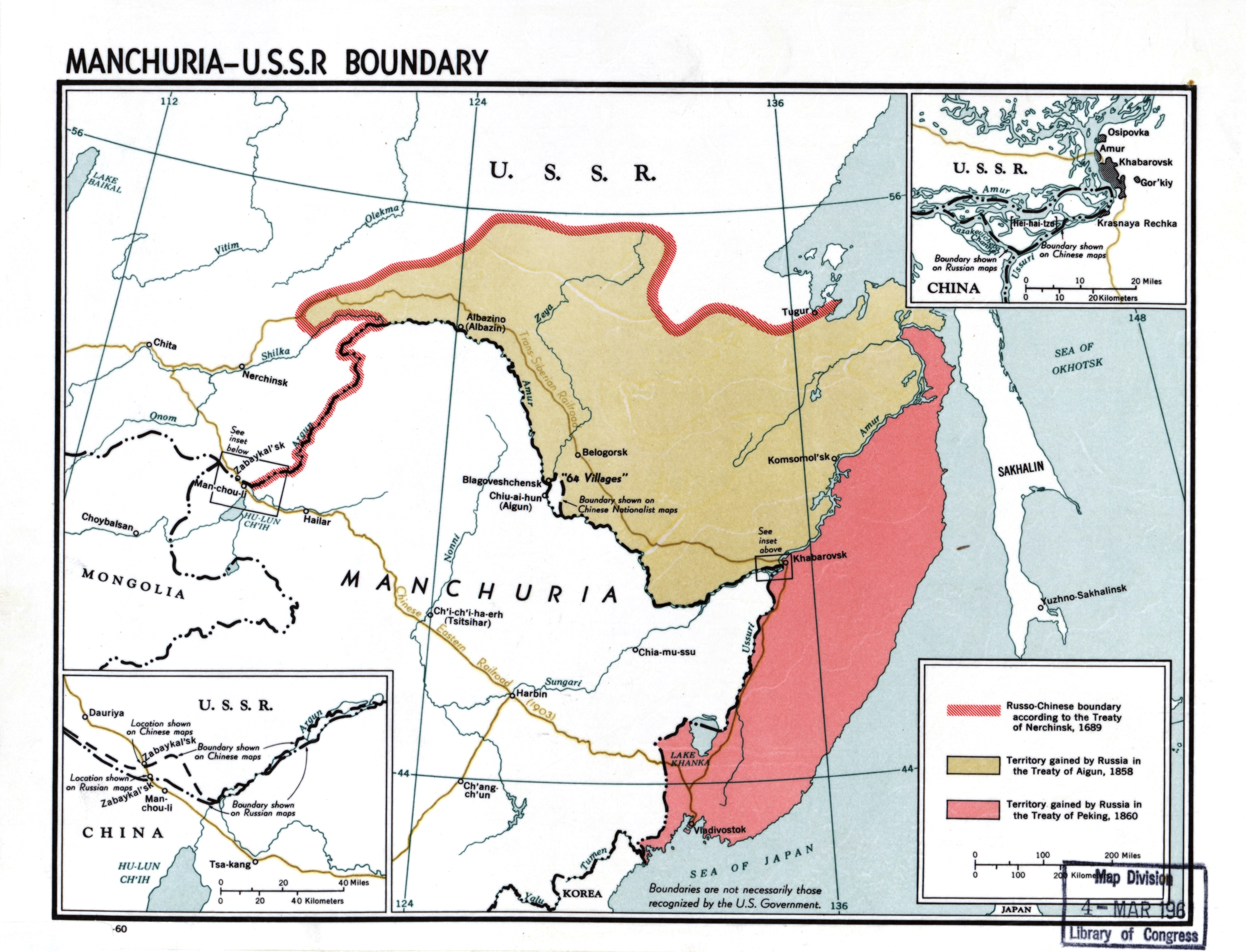
Political evolution of the Sino-Russian frontier in the 17th–19th centuries Ceded by the 1858 Treaty of Aigun Ceded by the 1860 Treaty of Peking

Between 1858 and 1860, the Russian Empire annexed territories adjoining the Amur River belonging to the Chinese Qing dynasty through the imposition of unequal treaties. The 1858 Treaty of Aigun, signed by the general Nikolay Muravyov representing the Russian Empire and the official Yishan representing Qing China, ceded Priamurye—a territory stretching from the Amur River north to the Stanovoy Mountains, but the Qing government initially refused to recognize the treaty's validity. Two years later, the Second Opium War concluded with the Convention of Peking, which affirmed the previous treaty as well as an additional cession including the entire Pacific coast to the Korean border, as well as the island of Sakhalin to Russia. These two territories roughly correspond to modern-day Amur Oblast and Primorsky Krai, respectively. Collectively, they are often referred to as Outer Manchuria, part of the greater region of Manchuria.

== Background ==
The Stanovoy Mountains divide the drainage basins of rivers flowing north into the Arctic from those flowing south into the Amur, which empties into the Pacific. The Stanovoys form the southeastern edge of the Siberian taiga, with some areas along the middle Amur being good for agriculture. From the seventh century, the area constituted the northern fringe of the Chinese-Korean-Manchu world.

Beginning in the 1630s, agents of the expanding Russian Empire began to reach the Pacific coast of Eurasia, and through dialogue and intimidation of local peoples they became aware of the Amur region and a potential direct contact with China. After departing from Yakutsk in June 1643, a Russian expedition crossed the Stanovoys the next spring, reaching a tributary of the Amur for the first time. The establishment of direct Sino-Russian relations over the coming decades included various hostilities. The territorial situation was ultimately clarified in the 1689 Treaty of Nerchinsk, wherein the Stanovoys and the Argun River were recognized as the border between the two empires, containing the recent pattern of attempted Russian expansion. This situation would ultimately remain stable until the 1840s.

In the 18th century, following the voyages of James Cook, British, French, and American vessels began to enter the Pacific in significant numbers; they were followed by Russian explorers such as Grigory Shelikhov and Nikolai Rezanov. These voyages were primarily concerned with the new Russian colonies in Alaska, which raised the question of defense for the eastern coast of Siberia, and ultimately the possibility of using the Amur as a route to supply the Pacific.

== Muravyov and the Treaty of Aigun (1858) ==
Territory of the Qing dynasty c. 1820

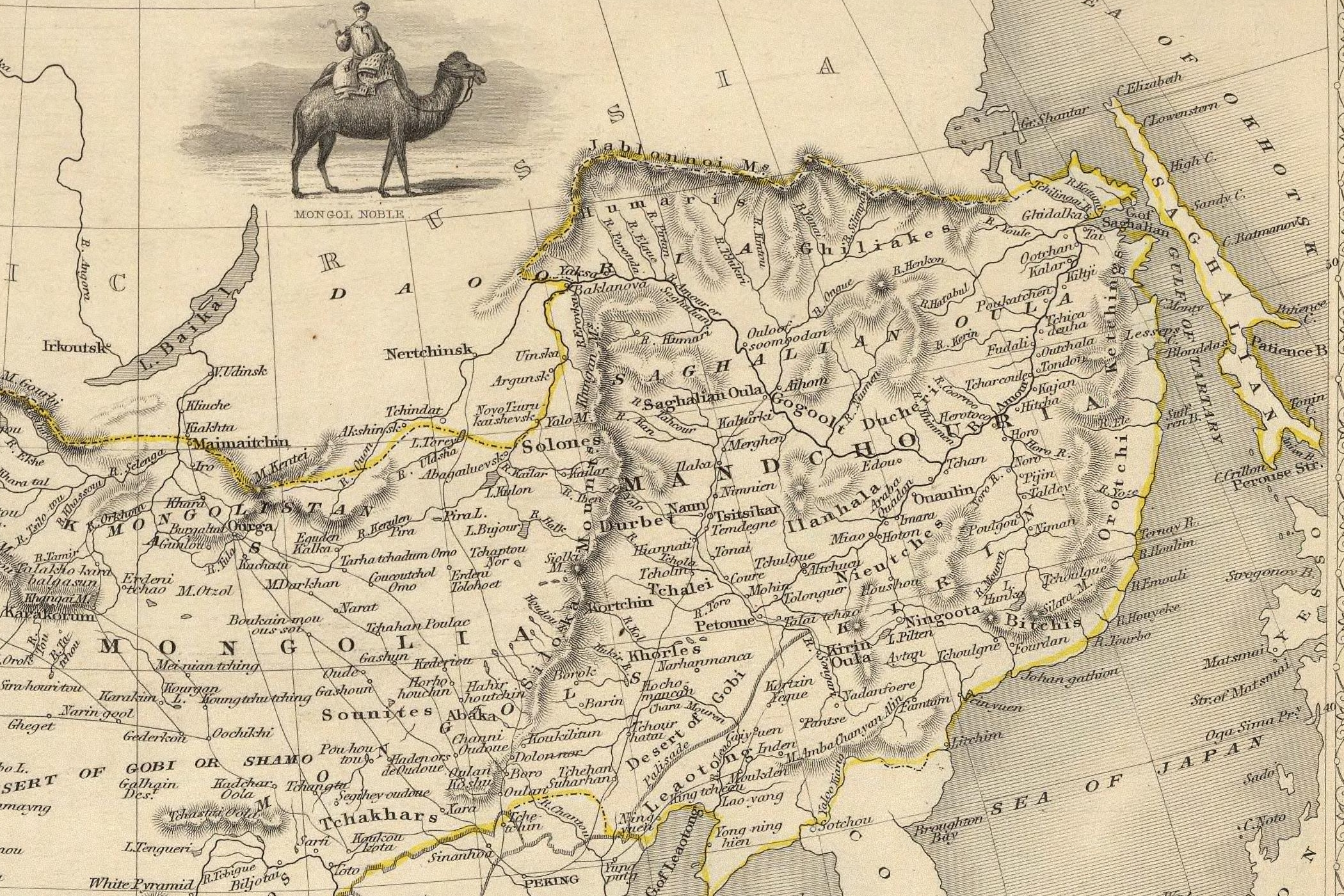
A British map from 1851 showing the Sino-Russian border prior to the annexations

In 1845, the Baltic German explorer Alexander von Middendorff visited the lands on the Amur and wrote a report on behalf of the Russian government. The navigator Aleksandr Gavrilov reached the mouth of the Amur in 1847, but failed to locate a deep-water entrance. In the same year, Nikolay Muravyov was appointed Governor-General of East Siberia. Before leaving for Irkutsk, Muravyov arranged for the creation of an "Amur Committee" to coordinate work in the area. In 1849, he traveled overland to Okhotsk, and from there went on to Petropavlovsk on Kamchatka. This would result in the main Russian naval center in the east relocating from Okhotsk to Petropavlovsk.

From 1849 to 1855, a Russian expedition commanded by Lieutenant-Captain Gennady Nevelskoy explored the Pacific coastline, the island of Sakhalin, and the outlet of the Amur. In 1849, Nevelskoy and his men sailed through a section of the Amur, and then south through the Strait of Tartary, proving that Sakhalin was an island, a fact which was kept a military secret. In 1850, Nevelskoy founded the settlement of Nikolayevsk on territory claimed by the Qing. The Russian foreign minister Karl Nesselrode attempted to prevent the settlement, but Czar Nicholas I in turn overruled him, declaring "where once the Russian flag is raised, it must not be lowered". Over the next three years, Nevelskoy established various other forts on territory claimed by the Qing around the mouth of the Amur. To establish a military force, Governor-General Muravyov created the Transbaikalian Cossacks by arming 20,000 serfs from local mines. From May to June 1854, he and 1,000 men sailed down the Amur to Nikolayevsk, and the Manchu governor at Aigun had no choice but to allow them to pass.

News of the Crimean War reached China in July 1854. In September, an Anglo-French naval force was defeated at the Siege of Petropavlovsk. Judging that Petropavlovsk could not be reliably defended further, Muravyov ordered Rear Admiral Vasily Zavoyko to move his forces into the Amur area instead. In May 1855, Charles Elliot's force found Zavoyko at De Kastri Bay, south of Cape Nevelskoy on the Strait of Tartary. Under the cover of fog, Zavoyko withdrew northward to the mouth of the Amur, a move that baffled the British, who were still under the impression that Sakhalin was connected to the mainland. That same year, Muravyov sent a 3,000-man force down the course of the Amur, including those intended as settlers. The Qing declared this to be illegal, but did not act. 1855 also saw Russia and Japan sign the Treaty of Shimoda, which temporarily resolved the conflict regarding Sakhalin and the Kuril Islands.

The Second Opium War broke out in 1856; two years later, the British and French captured Guangdong. When news of this reached Saint Petersburg, Alexander Gorchakov, the foreign minister who had replaced Nesselrode, decided that it was time to "activate Russian Far Eastern Policy". Muravyov was given plenipotentiary powers, and Admiral Yevfimiy Putyatin—who had represented the Russians in the earlier treaty negotiations with Japan—was sent to Beijing to negotiate a more favorable relationship.

Over 1856 and 1857, Muravyov sent more settlers down the Amur. In 1858, he traveled its course himself; his instructions were to not use force except in rescuing captives. Upon reaching Aigun, he presented the local governor with what would become known as the Treaty of Aigun. The treaty ceded all territories north of the Amur to Russia, and declared the area east of the Ussuri River and south of the Amur to be a Sino-Russian condominium until further negotiations could take place. The local governor signed the treaty, but the Qing government in Beijing refused to ratify it, declaring it to be invalid. Muravyov continued down the Amur, founding Khabarovsk at the mouth of the Ussuri. In September 1858, Czar Alexander II promoted him to a full generalship, and granted him the suffix "Amursky". The following year, General Muravyov-Amursky sent an expedition to explore the Pacific coast, which reached as far south as present-day Vladivostok.

== Putyatin, Ignatyev, and the Convention of Peking (1860) ==
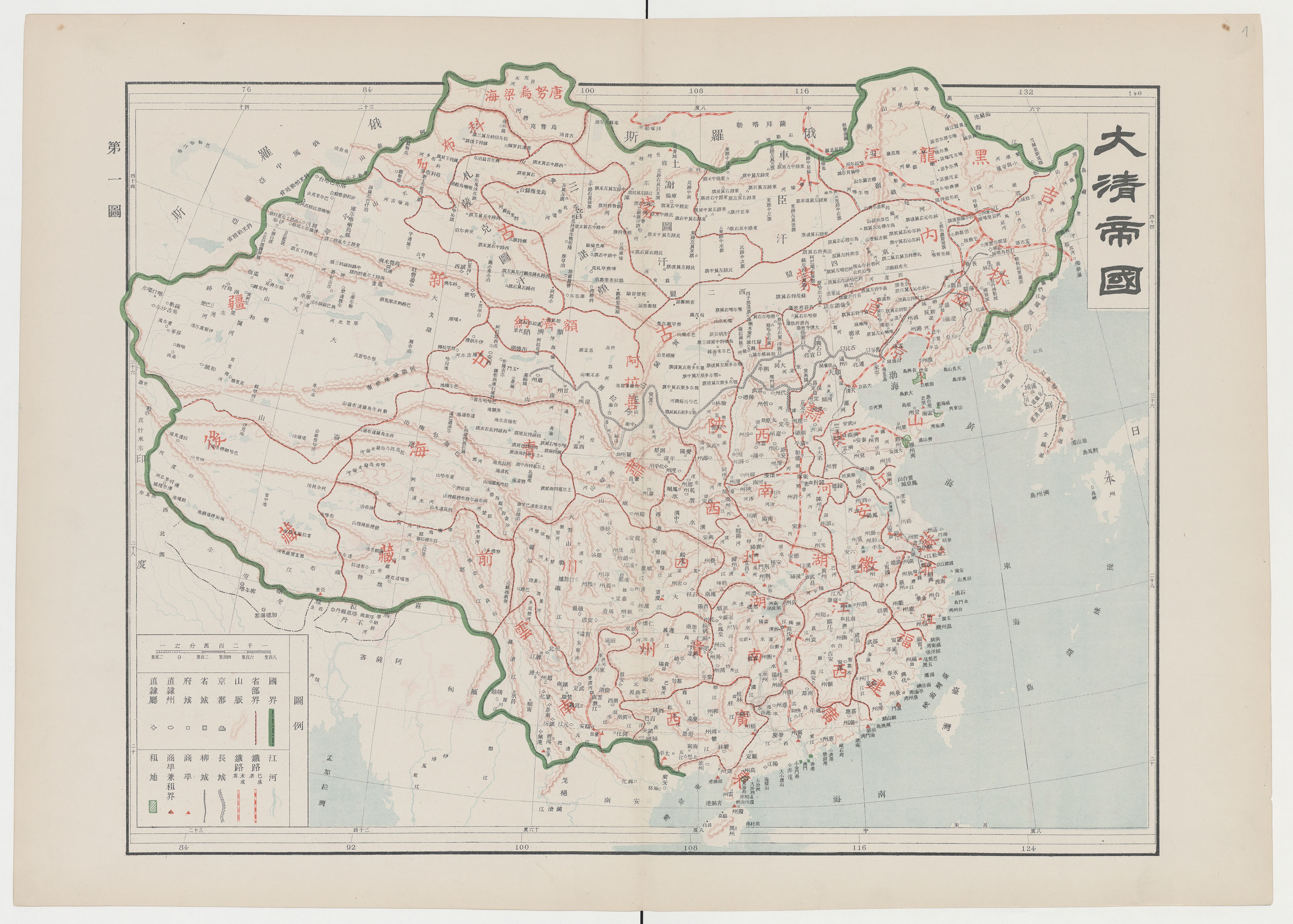
Official Chinese map of the Qing territories published in 1905

Meanwhile, Admiral Putyatin was traveling overland to China. Reaching Kyakhta, he was refused entry in the spring of 1857. He sailed down the Amur and took his ship to Tianjin. Refused entry again, he joined the British and French at Shanghai. When the Allies took the Taku Forts Putyatin offered himself as a mediator. The result was the Treaties of Tientsin, which granted most of the Allied demands. Without fully informing the Allies, Putyatin made a separate deal with the Chinese on 13 June 1858.

In return for Russian cannon, military instructors, and 20,000 rifles, the deal stipulated that the frontier would be adjusted in some yet unspecified way. Putyatin was not aware of the Aigun treaty which had been signed 16 days earlier. After the Allies withdrew the Chinese failed to implement the treaties. The Allies returned in June 1859, attempted to retake the Taku forts and failed. As a result, the Chinese refused to ratify the treaties. At this point, a 27-year-old major general named Nikolay Pavlovich Ignatyev entered the picture. In March 1859 he was assigned to accompany the Russian weapons and instructors. At the frontier he found that the Chinese had rejected the treaties and would not accept the weapons. He continued to Beijing where he stayed at the Russian ecclesiastical mission and attempted to negotiate with the Manchus.

Hearing of Allied preparations, Ignatyev joined the British and French in Shanghai and proved to be helpful to the Allied councils, as he had a map of Beijing and good interpreters. By October 1860, the British and French had retaken the forts; they entered Beijing, and the Emperor fled to Rehe Province. Ignatyev placed himself as an intermediary between the Europeans and Chinese. At the Convention of Peking, two treaties were signed on 24 and 25 October 1860, meeting nearly all of the Allied demands. Ignatyev continued negotiations for a Sino-Russian treaty, convincing the Chinese that only his support would cause Allied forces to withdraw from the capital. The result was the Russo-Chinese Convention of Peking, which took place on 14 November 1860 and by which the Treaty of Tientsin was ratified; its terms stipulated that all land north of the Amur and east of the Ussuri would be ceded to Russia. The Russian Empire had been able to exploit Chinese weakness by means of diplomacy, in addition to several thousand of its own troops and the strength of the other European powers—ultimately annexing 350,000 square miles (910,000 km^{2}) of Chinese territory. With the exception of Muravyov's cannonade at Aigun, the Russians had not been required to fire a single shot.

== See also ==
- History of Sino-Russian relations
- Outer Manchuria
- Outer Mongolia
- Tannu Uriankhai
- Russia in the Opium Wars
- Russian invasion of Manchuria
- Sixty-Four Villages East of the River
- Blagoveshchensk massacre and Sixty-Four Villages East of the River massacre
- Treaty of Turin (1860)
