= Russia in the Opium Wars =

Second Opium War
- Part of Opium Wars
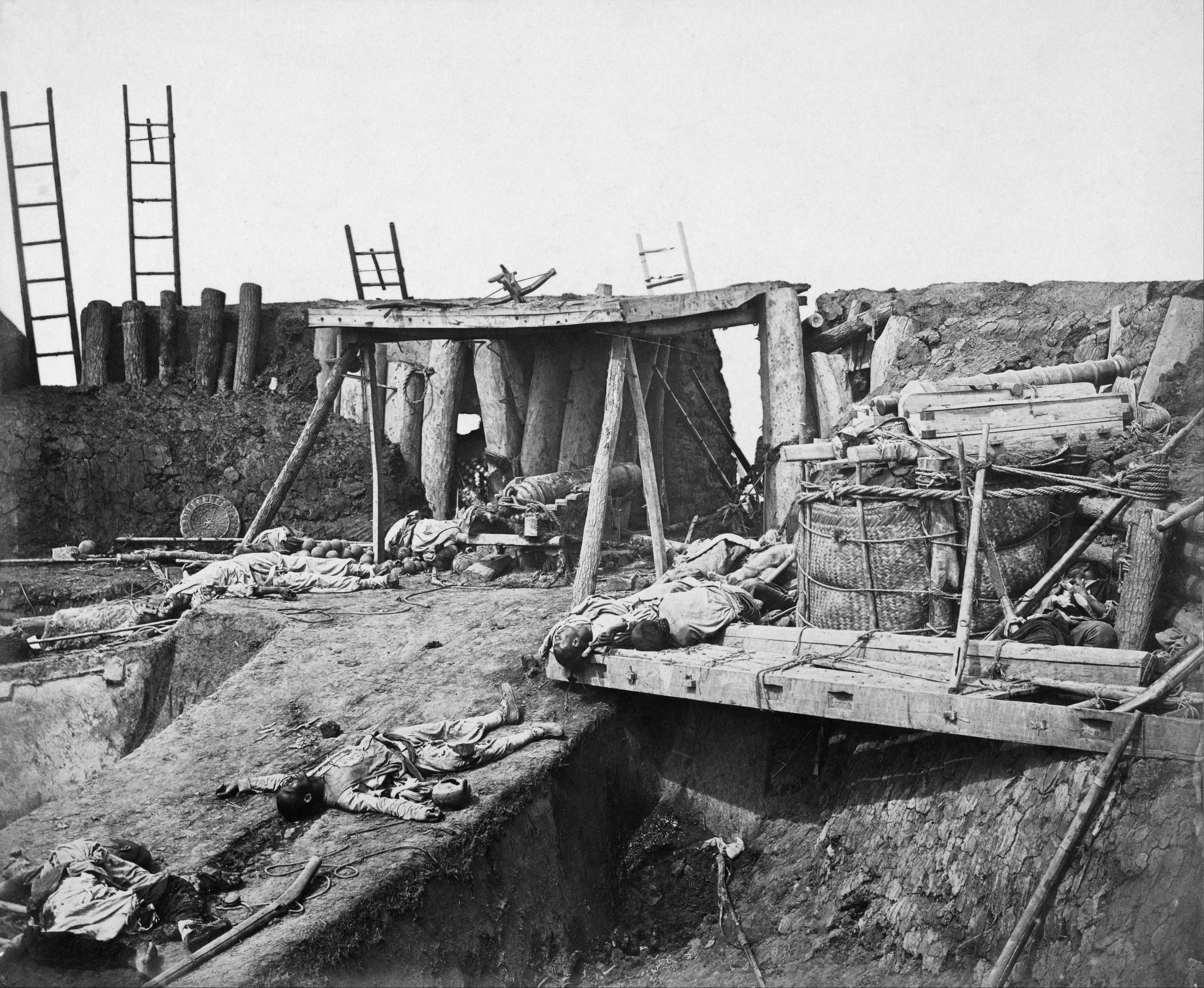
- Captured Upper North Taku Fort (Taku Forts), 1860
Date	8 October 1856 – 24 October 1860
Location	China
Result	Russian Empire's formal victory

Imperial Russia was a participant of the Chinese Opium Wars, more specifically in the second war which occurred in 1856–1860. Russia played a role of mediator, being both an ally with Britain, France, and the United States and negotiator with the elites of the Qing dynasty. Throughout the whole war period Russia provided minimal amount of military aid and used diplomatic power to present its interests in the conflict. As a result of the ratified agreements in 1860 Russia received former Manchurian lands along the Ussuri river and increased its economical influence on China.

== Background ==
After the First Opium War in 1840 China was in a shaky situation due to onerous conditions of the ratified peace treaty and inner sociopolitical conflict within the nation: the weakening of the power of the Manchu emperors led to an open Taiping Rebellion and, most importantly, formation of the Taiping State, with which the government fought for many years ever since. In 1854 the alliance of Britain, France, and the United States came up with new, tougher demands: they wanted unlimited trade rights throughout entire China, admission of their permanent ambassadors to Beijing (the closed part of the city), and the official right to trade opium. The Qing government rejected these demands, however this did not lead to an open conflict yet, since the main British military forces were focused on the battlefronts in Russia and Persia.

== First encounter ==
After a victorious campaign in the Crimean War of 1856, Britain transferred its focus on Qing China to further expand its political influence on the empire. On 8 October 1856 they found one: Chinese authorities arrested Arrow, a British commercial ship that was smuggling goods and selling opium. Britain demanded to free the sailors, as they believed the accusation was falsified, but their petitions were declined. In April 1857 Britain officially declared war against Qing China.

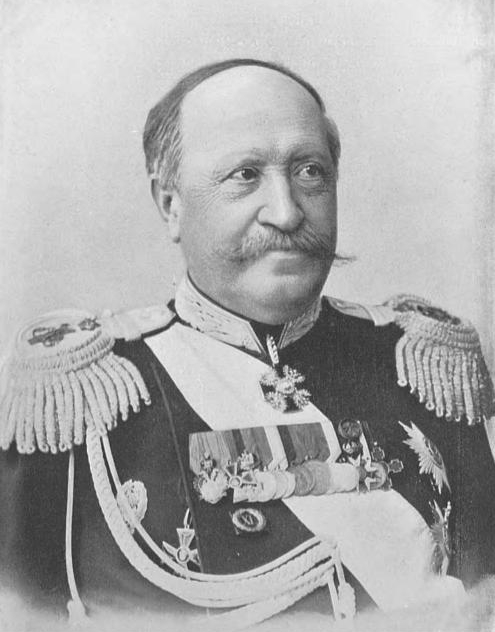
Nikolay Pavlovich Ignatyev

British military campaign was soon accompanied by France and the United States which had similar interests in this area. As the campaign proceeded with success, Russia realized that this could be an opportunity to expand its influence in the region. Victory of any of the sides did not satisfy the Empire: if China would win, Russia's chances of ratifying any treaty would be equal to zero. After all, even the territory north of the Amur called it "given to Russia for temporary use". If the allies would win, then in order to avoid competition they would not allow Russia to strengthen on the Pacific coast and themselves would occupy convenient bays from the mouth of the Amur to the border with Korea. Under these conditions, Russia would have only one chance of success – acting as an intermediary between the warring sides. This card also had to be played by a new Russian envoy in China.

After completing a diplomatic mission in Crimea, General major Nikolay Pavlovich Ignatyev was assigned to negotiate with the Qing to ratify the Aigun Treaty, which would update the previous arrangements regarding territorial borders of two countries. The first attempt made by Ignatyev was unsuccessful: he was asked to leave the country as soon as possible, as this agreement was not in their interest. The diplomat refused to leave citing the orders he was given by his superiors. During this time, Ignatyev used all possible diplomatic arsenal – from assurances of eternal friendship of fraternal neighboring peoples to threats of military seizure of territories. Despite his efforts, the necessary result was not achieved. Ignatyev then decided to negotiate not with the Chinese, but the allied forces instead, so he went to Shanghai to do so.

Thinly maneuvering between all the warring parties, he prevented any attempts of their rapprochement without his participation. One the one hand, he cheered the Chinese and gave them hope to win in this war. On the other, he lulled the vigilance of the allied forces, assuring that the existing land issues between China and Russia had already been settled and, therefore, his diplomatic service has no bad intentions.

On May 20, 1858 Qing lost a major fortification during the battle for Taku forts and called for peace. On May 28 China was forced to sign the Aigun Treaty, despite the cabalistic conditions that Russia proposed: the sides agreed that the left bank of the Amur River from the Argun River to the mouth was recognized as Russian, and the Ussuri region from the confluence of Ussuri and Amur rivers all the way to the sea remained in common possession until the definition of the border. Also, naval routes on the Amur, Sungari and Ussuri were restricted to only Russian and Chinese vessels. This agreement replaced the previous territorial agreement, the Treaty of Nerchinsk, signed in 1689.

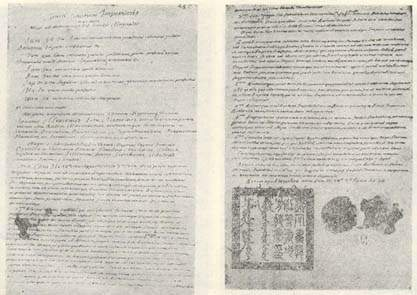
Treaty of Nerchinsk (1689)

After the Aigun Treaty the allied forces, with the help of General Ignatyev, signed the four positions of the Treaty of Tientsin. They stated the following:

1. Britain, France, Russia, and the U.S. would have the right to establish diplomatic legations (small embassies) in Beijing (a closed city at the time)
2. Eleven additional Chinese ports would be opened for foreign trade, including Niuzhuang, Tamsui (former name of Taiwan), Hankou and Nanjing
3. The right of all foreign vessels including commercial ships to navigate freely on the Yangtze River
4. The right of foreigners to travel in the internal regions of China, which had been formerly banned
5. China was to pay an indemnity of four million taels of silver to Britain and two million to France.

As a result, Russia did not use a single soldier and achieved success only using diplomatic power.

== Second encounter (Third Opium War?) ==
Multiple historians separate the periods of the Second Opium War into pre-Tientsin Treaty and post-Tientsin Treaty periods and formally define the Third Opium War (1859–1860). This period was marked by the last resistant attempt from the Chinese not to ratify the previously signed treaties.

The documents were planned to be ratified in Beijing in 1859. The Russian envoy arrived in the capital of China by land, but the British, French and American diplomats decided to arrive by sea. As they arrived Hai river on which supposedly stood the destroyed fort of Taku, allies saw that those fortifications were not only reconstructed, but fully armed and ready to fire. As the armies tried to enter Tianjin with force, they encountered strong military resistance, which meant that the war was resumed and the previous treaties were obsolete. Receiving severe losses in the battle, the allied forces had to retreat to Shanghai. The Russian mission in Beijing also strategically retreated to get a better picture of the situation.

After regrouping the allied army marched through the previously conquered lands up to Beijing. At the end of September 1860, the allied force of 7,000 men approached the capital, winning several battles along the way. Due to severe disobedience of the Chinese, British forces were set to pillage Beijing and cause serious damage to its surroundings. The Russian envoy entered the city to join the negotiations. Immediately upon Ignatyev's return on 3 October, he met with Chinese delegation in the Southern Compound of the Russian Spiritual Mission. The diplomatic officials were begging the Russian general to save the city from total destruction. He agreed to help, but set 5 conditions, under which this aid would be accommodated. Among the five conditions was the final ratification of the Treaty of Aigun and delineation along the Ussuri river to the Japanese Sea and the Chinese pickets in Western China. Being in a desperate position, Prince Gong had to agree with all conditions and asked Ignatyev to be the main negotiator on his behalf.

The peace treaty negotiations took place in the premises of the Russian Mission. All translational difficulties were addressed to Ignatyev which he easily resolved. After the signing of the treaties, the attacking army left the borders of Beijing. Ignatyev made sure every official of the allied forces left, because the Treaty of Aigun was still kept in strictest secret.

Russian historian V. M. Hevrolina described Ignatyev's diplomatic games as the following:

In fact, Ignatiev walked on the edge of the knife <...> He certainly had some adventurism, which often saved him in difficult situations. Ignatiev, however, believed in his lucky star and was not afraid to take risks.

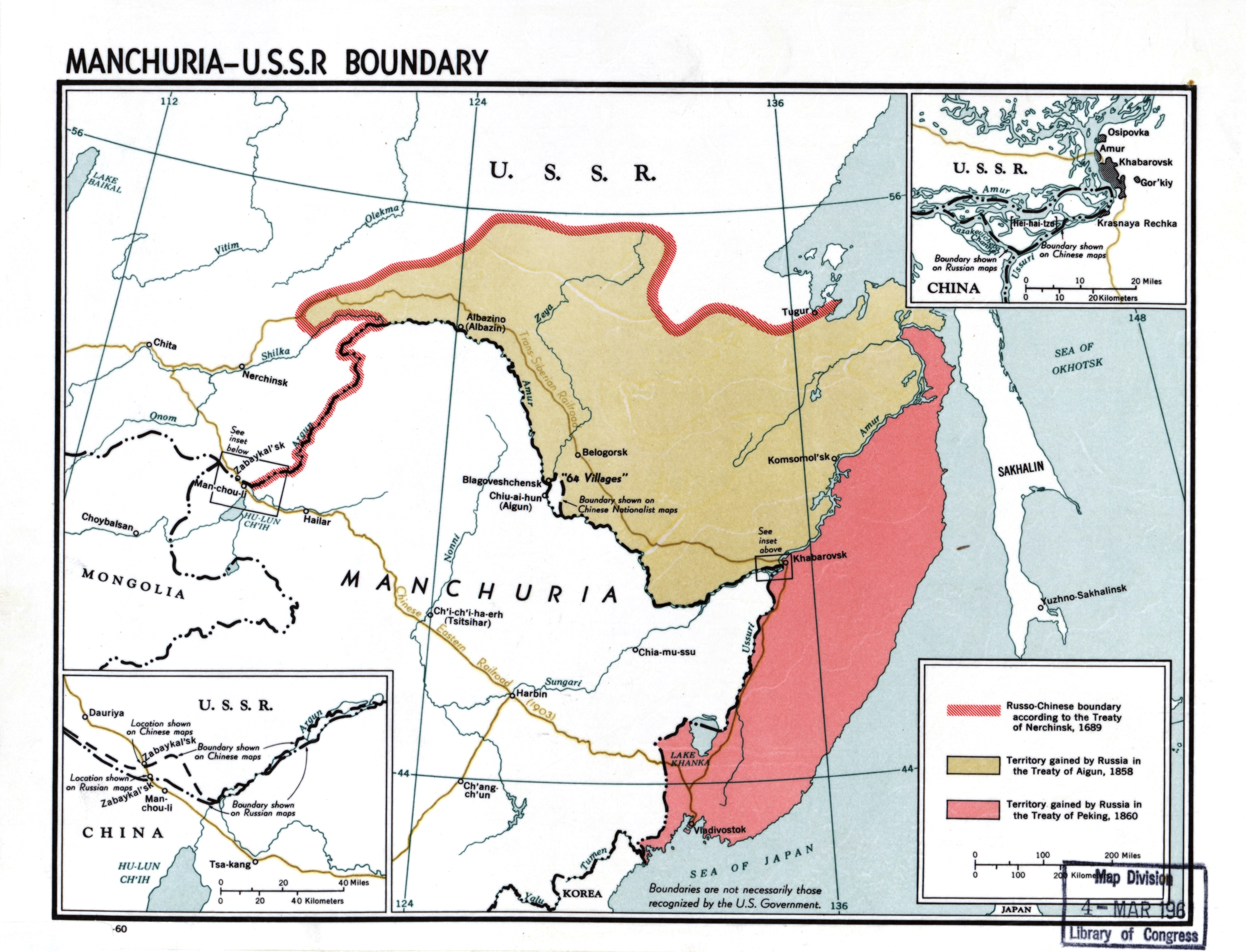
The Treaty of Aigun (1858–1860)

== Consequences ==
As a result of Ignatyev's accomplishments and negotiatory work, the Chinese government immediately ratified the treaty on 14 November 1860, according to which Russia was affirmed both the left bank of the Amur River and the Ussuri River with all the maritime harbors to the bay Posyet and the Manchurian coast to Korea (or Primorsky region); the west border of the lake Nor-Zaysang in the Heavenly Mountains was considerably corrected; last but not least, Russia secured the right of overland trade in Chinese possessions.

Soon, in 1860, the Russian Mission in the Far East would establish the city of Vladivostok securing the right of the land ownership acquired from the ratified treaty.
