= Outer Manchuria =

Historical region in Northeast Asia

Outer Manchuria Приамурье (Russian) 外東北 (Chinese) Great Northeast Area Russian Manchuria
- Historical region of Russia
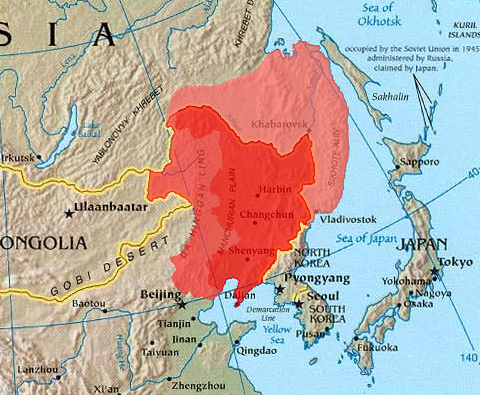
- Outer Manchuria, north and east of the China-Russia border, shown in pink.
- Country: Russia (since 1860)
- Federal subjects: Jewish Autonomous Oblast; Khabarovsk Krai; Primorsky Krai; Amur Oblast; Zabaykalsky Krai
- Named for: Manchuria

Area
  - Total: 910,000 km^{2} (350,000 sq mi)
- Demonym: Outer Manchurian

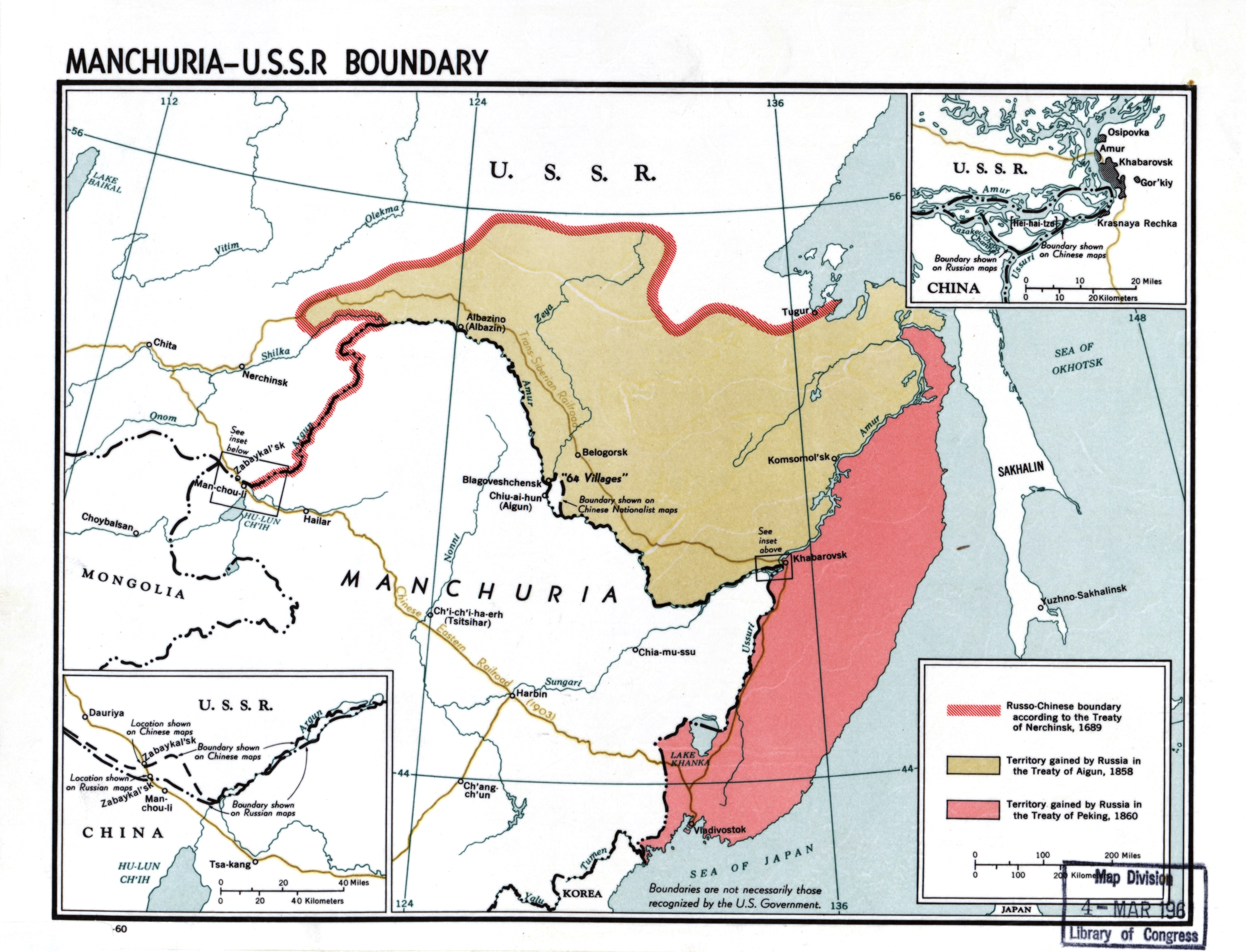
Map showing the original border (in pink) between Qing Manchuria and Russia according to the 1689 Treaty of Nerchinsk, and subsequent losses of Chinese territory to Russia in the 1858 Treaty of Aigun (beige) and 1860 Treaty of Peking (pink)

Outer Manchuria, also called Great Northeast Area (Chinese: 外東北 Wài Dōngběi "Outer North-East") or Russian Manchuria, refers to a region in Northeast Asia that is now part of the Russian Far East, but historically formed part of Manchuria until the mid-19th century. While Manchuria now more normatively refers to Northeast China, it originally included areas consisting of Priamurye between the left bank of Amur River and the Stanovoy Range to the north, and Primorskaya which covered the area in the right bank of both the Ussuri River and the lower Amur River to the Pacific Coast. The region was ruled by a series of Chinese dynasties and the Mongol Empire, but control of the area was ceded to the Russian Empire by Qing China during the Amur Annexation in the 1858 Treaty of Aigun and 1860 Treaty of Peking, with the terms "Outer Manchuria" and "Russian Manchuria" arising after the Russian annexation.

Prior to its annexation by Russia, Outer Manchuria was predominantly inhabited by various Tungusic peoples who were categorized by the Han Chinese as "Wild Jurchens". The Evenks, who speak a closely related Tungusic language to Manchu, make up a significant part of the indigenous population today. When the region was a part of the Qing Empire, a small population of Han Chinese men migrated to Outer Manchuria and married the local Tungusic women. Their mixed descendants have emerged as a distinct ethnic group known as the Taz people.

== Etymology ==
"Manchuria" was coined in the 19th century to refer to the northeastern part of the Qing Empire, the traditional homeland of the Manchu people. After the Amur Annexation by the Russian Empire, the ceded areas were known as "Outer Manchuria" or "Russian Manchuria". (Russian: Приаму́рье, romanized: Priamurye; (Note: Now Priamurye usually refers to a narrower region of Amur Oblast and parts of Khabarovsk Krai.) simplified Chinese: 外满洲; traditional Chinese: 外滿洲; pinyin: Wài Mǎnzhōu or simplified Chinese: 外东北; traditional Chinese: 外東北; pinyin: Wài Dōngběi; lit. 'outer northeast').

== History ==
Outer Manchuria comprises the modern-day Russian areas of Primorsky Krai, southern Khabarovsk Krai, the Jewish Autonomous Oblast, the Amur Oblast and the island of Sakhalin.

In the 7th century, the Tang dynasty built administrative and military outposts on the Amur and in Suchan. The region was later controlled by the Parhae, a Korean-Manchu polity, during which time Korean communities were established in the region.

The northern part of the area was disputed by Qing China and the Russian Empire, in the midst of the Russia's Far East expansion, between 1643 and 1689. The Treaty of Nerchinsk signed in 1689 after a series of conflicts, defined the Sino–Russian border as the Stanovoy Mountains and the Argun River. When the Qing sent officials to erect boundary markers, the markers were set up far to the south of the agreed limits, ignoring some 23,000 square miles of territory.

In 1809, the Japanese government sent explorer Mamiya Rinzō to Sakhalin and the region of the Amur to determine the extent of Russian influence and penetration.

Chang estimates that there were ten thousand Chinese and four to five thousand Koreans in the region during the 19th century. There might have been more than this number as well. The Qing had sent many of its political prisoners and criminals to exile in Manchuria beginning in 1644. This included all of the ethnic groups in China including Koreans. Perhaps, the Han dynasties prior to the Qing did so as well.

To preserve the Manchu character of Manchuria, the Qing dynasty discouraged Han Chinese settlement in Manchuria; nevertheless, there was significant Han Chinese migration into areas south of the Amur and west of the Ussuri. By the mid-19th century, there were very few subjects of the Qing Empire living in the areas north of the Amur and east of the Ussuri, and Qing authority in the area was seen as tenuous by the Russians. Despite warnings, Qing authorities remained indecisive about how to respond to the Russian presence. In 1856, the Russian military entered the area north of the Amur on a pretext of defending the area from France and the UK; Russian settlers founded new towns and cut down forests in the region, and the Russian government created a new maritime province, Primorskaya Oblast, including Sakhalin, the mouth of the Amur, and Kamchatka with its capital at Nikolayevsk-on-Amur. After losing the Opium Wars, Qing China was forced to sign a series of treaties that gave away territories and ports to various Western powers as well as to Russia and Japan; these were collectively known by the Chinese side as the Unequal Treaties. Starting with the Treaty of Aigun in 1858 and, in the wake of the Second Opium War, the Treaty of Peking in 1860, the Sino–Russian border was realigned in Russia's favour along the Amur and Ussuri rivers. As a result, China lost the region that came to be known as Outer Manchuria or Russian Manchuria (an area of 350,000 square miles (910,000 km^{2})) and access to the Sea of Japan. In the wake of these events, the Qing government changed course and encouraged Han Chinese migration to Manchuria (Chuang Guandong).

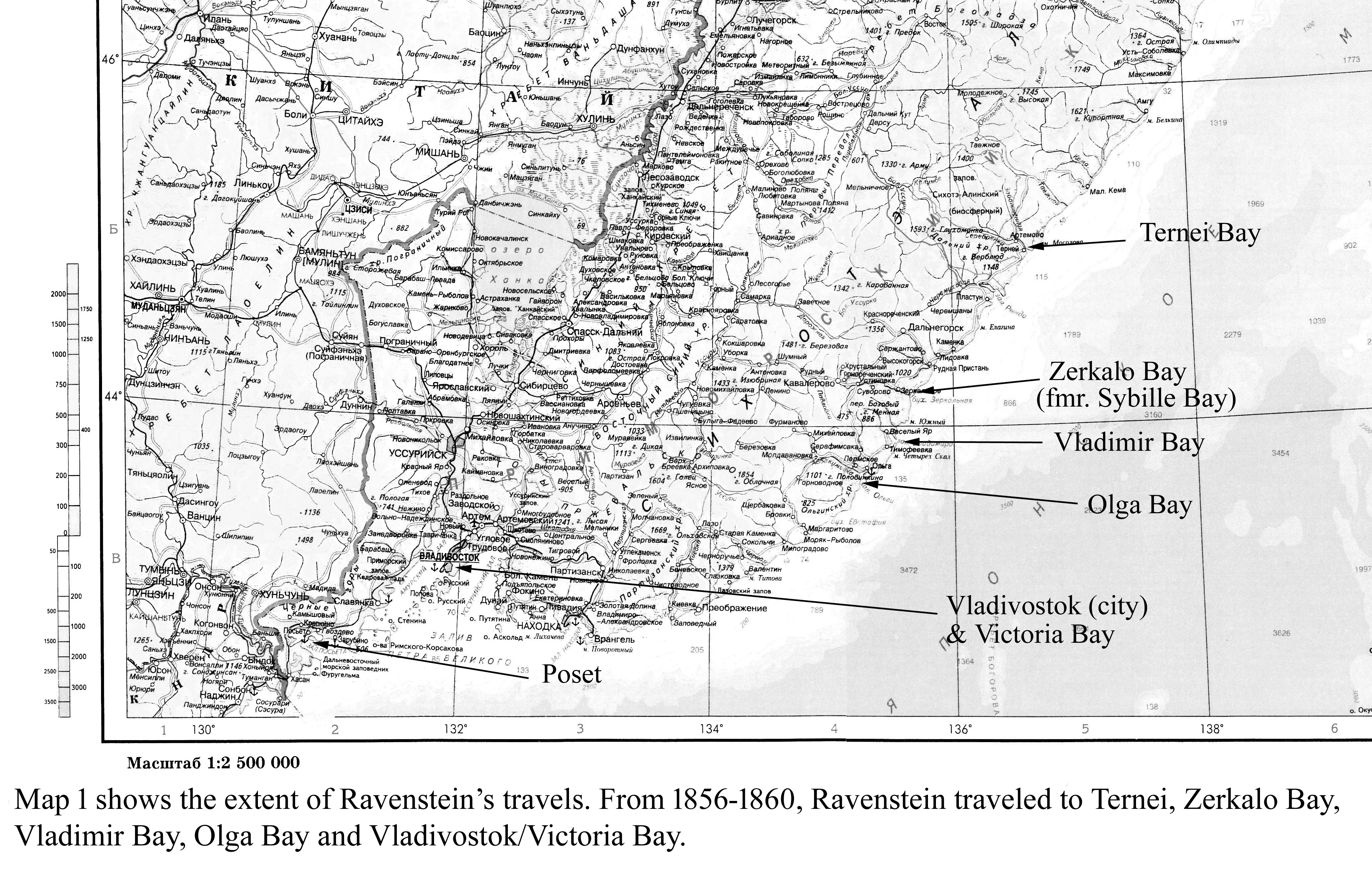
Map Presenting Ernst G. Ravenstein's Travels in the Primore from 1854 to 1860

After 1860, Russian historians began to intentionally erase the histories and contributions of the Chinese and Koreans to the Russian Far East. The Russian historian, Semyon D. Anosov wrote, “In the 17th century, the Manchu-Tungus tribes living in the region were conquered by China and deported. Since then, the region has been deserted.” Kim Syn Khva, a Soviet Korean historian and author of Essays on the History of the Soviet Koreans [очерки по историй Советских корейтсев], wrote, "The first Korean migrants appeared in the southern Ussuri region when secretly 13 families came here fleeing Korea from unbearable poverty and famine" in 1863. However, the historian, Jon K. Chang found Western sources, most notably Ernst G. Ravenstein's The Russians on the Amur and J.M. Tronson's Personal Narrative of a Voyage to Japan, Kamtschatka, Siberia, Tartary, and Various Parts of Coast of China: In H.M.S. Barracouta, which detailed Chinese, Korean and Manchu settlements from Ternei to Vladivostok and Poset before 1863 (see small map below).

Both Ravenstein (1856-60) and Tronson (1854-56) explored the Russian Far East before 1860. Ravenstein's account notes the differences between Koreans and Chinese versus the Manchus in the region. The former prepared and sold trepangs according to Ravenstein. They (Chinese and Koreans) also raised crops and cattle and lived in small villages and settlements among their co-ethnics. Ravenstein was a German geographer, cartographer and ethnographer of some note. Tronson's account called all of the East Asians whether Chinese, Korean, Manchu or Tungusic peoples "Mantchu-Tartars." Chang also interviewed an elderly Soviet Korean grandmother in 2008, named Soon-Ok Li. Ms. Li stated that, "No one came from Korea. We have always lived in Vondo [the Korean name for the Russian Far East]. Even my grandparents [Ms. Li was born in 1928] were born here."

== Modern opinions ==
=== In Russia ===
In 2016, Victor L. Larin, the director of the Institute of History, Archaeology and Ethnography of the Peoples of the Far East in Vladivostok, said that the fact that Russia had built the city "is a historical fact that cannot be rewritten", and that the notion that Vladivostok was ever a Chinese town is a "myth" based on a misreading of evidence that a few Chinese sometimes came to the area to fish and collect sea cucumbers.

In 2024, Sergey Radchenko, a professor at Johns Hopkins SAIS known for his writings on Sino-Russian relations, stated, "China fully recognizes Russia's sovereignty over these territories" (referring to the Russian Far East). He also called Taiwanese President Lai Ching-te "seriously misguided" for suggesting that China take back their "lost territories" rather than invade Taiwan. The same year Maria Zakharova, the spokeswoman for the Russian Foreign Ministry, said that "the mutual renunciation of territorial claims by Moscow and Beijing had been enshrined in the July 16, 2001, Treaty of Good Neighborliness, Friendship and Cooperation, with Moscow and Beijing putting border issues to bed once and for all by signing the Additional Agreement on the Eastern part of the Russia-China Border on October 14, 2004, and ratifying the document later. This position was confirmed in a number of other joint documents that China and Russia adopted at various levels, including at the highest one."

=== In the West ===
Despite the potential for territorial claims coextensive with the Qing dynasty, Chinese leaders as of 2014 had not suggested that Mongolia and part of Outer or Russian Manchuria would be a legitimate objective. In April 2023, US diplomat John Bolton speculated that China is "undoubtedly eyeing this vast territory, which potentially contains incalculable mineral wealth", referring to Asian Russia generally, further noting that "[s]ignificant portions of this region were under Chinese sovereignty until the 1860 Treaty of Peking". However, two American historians, Jon K. Chang and Bruce A. Elleman, disagree with Larin, Radchenko and other Russian historians. Chang and Elleman note that in 1919 and 1920, Lev M. Karakhan, the Soviet deputy minister (also called "commissar") of foreign affairs, issued two legally binding "declarations" called the Karakhan Manifestos in which he promised to return to China all territories taken in Siberia and Manchuria during the Tsarist period and to return the Chinese Eastern Railway and other concessions. He signed his name on both documents as deputy minister of foreign affairs. To date, China has never renounced the offer of the two Karakhan Manifestos. During 1991 and 2004, there were border-treaties between Russia and China. The Karakhan Manifestos are not border treaties. They are unilateral, but legally binding offers of the return of territory to China. Here are three excerpts from the first Karakhan Manifesto (I) according to the translated, English version published by Allen S. Whiting:

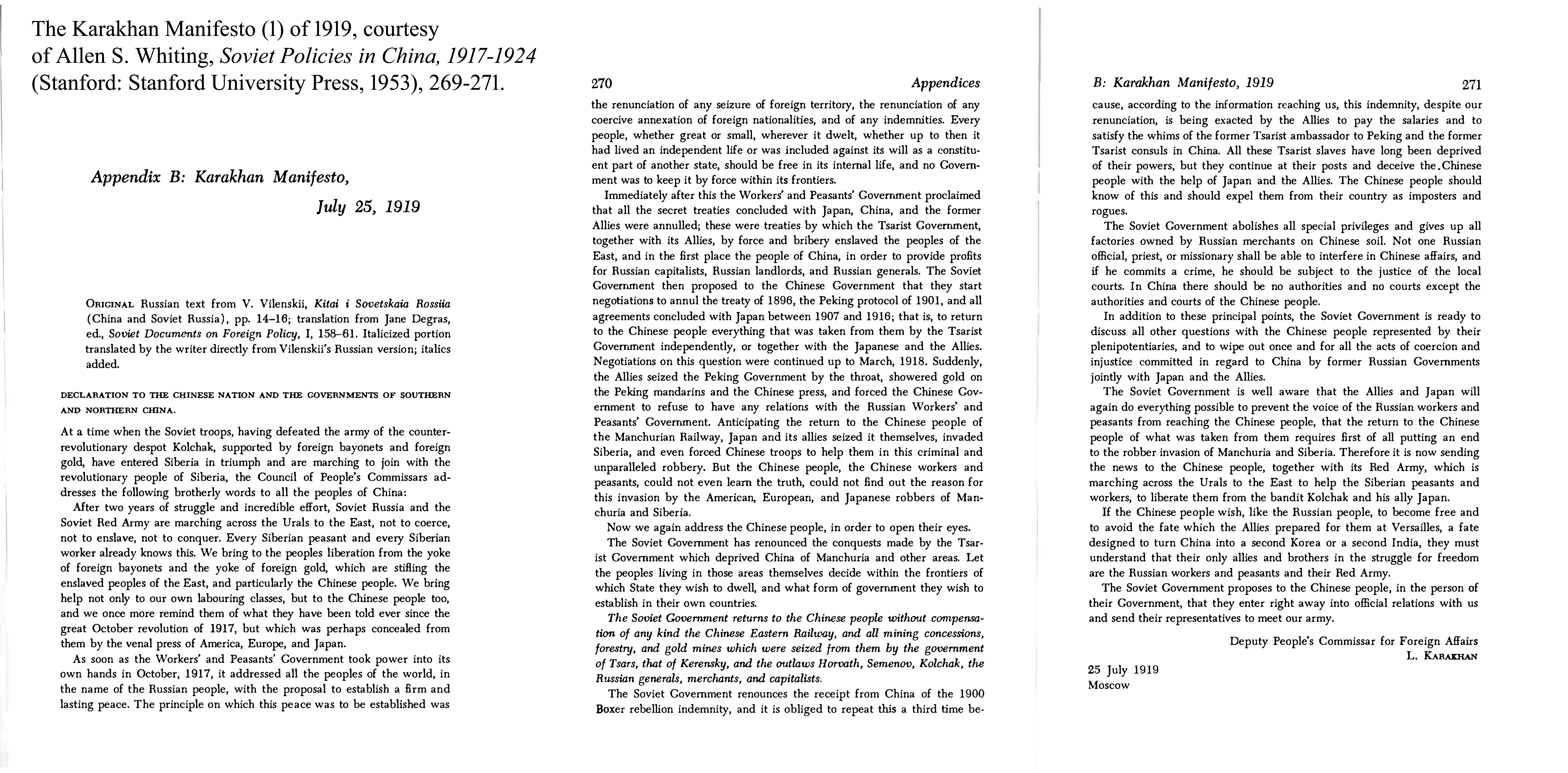
Karakhan Manifesto I (signed 25 July 1919) courtesy of Allen S. Whiting's Soviet Policies in China, 1917–1924.

We bring help not only to our own labouring classes, but to the Chinese people too, and we once more remind them of what they have been told ever since the great October revolution of 1917, but which was perhaps concealed from them by the venal press of America, Europe, and Japan. ...

But the Chinese people, the Chinese workers and peasants, could not even learn the truth, could not find out the reason for this invasion by the American, European, and Japanese robbers of Manchuria and Siberia. ...

The Soviet Government has renounced the conquests made by the Tsarist Government which deprived China of Manchuria and other areas. ... The Soviet Government is well aware ... that the return to the Chinese people of what was taken from them requires first of all putting an end to the robber invasion of Manchuria and Siberia. The Karakhan Manifestos I and II are similar. Both promise to return "the conquests made by the Tsarist Government which deprived China of Manchuria and other areas."

— Whiting, Soviet Policies, pp. 269–271

== Place names ==
Today, there are reminders of the ancient Manchu domination in English-language toponyms: for example, the Sikhote-Alin, the great coastal range; the Khanka Lake; the Amur and Ussuri rivers; the Greater Khingan, Lesser Khingan and other small mountain ranges; and the Shantar Islands.

In 1973, the Soviet Union renamed several locations in the region that bore names of Chinese origin. Names affected included Partizansk for Suchan; Dalnegorsk for Tetyukhe; Rudnaya Pristan for Tetyukhe‐Pristan; Dalnerechensk for Iman; Sibirtsevo for Mankovka; Gurskoye for Khungari; Cherenshany for Sinan cha; Rudny for Lifudzin; and Uglekamensk for Severny Suchan.

On 14 February 2023, the Ministry of Natural Resources of the People's Republic of China relabelled eight cities and areas inside Russia in the region with Chinese names. The eight names are Boli for Khabarovsk, Hailanpao for Blagoveshchensk, Haishenwai (Haishenwei) for Vladivostok, Kuye for Sakhalin, Miaojie for Nikolayevsk-on-Amur, Nibuchu for Nerchinsk, Outer Khingan (Outer Xing'an) for Stanovoy Range, and Shuangchengzi for Ussuriysk.

== See also ==
- Chinese Tartary
- Karakhan Manifesto
- 1991 Sino–Russian Border Agreement
- Bolshoy Ussuriysky Island
- Zhenbao Island
- Sixty-Four Villages East of the River
- 1900 Amur anti-Chinese pogroms
- Amur Annexation
- Outer Mongolia
- Renaming of geographical objects in the Russian Far East
