= Treaty of Aigun =

1858 treaty between Russia and China

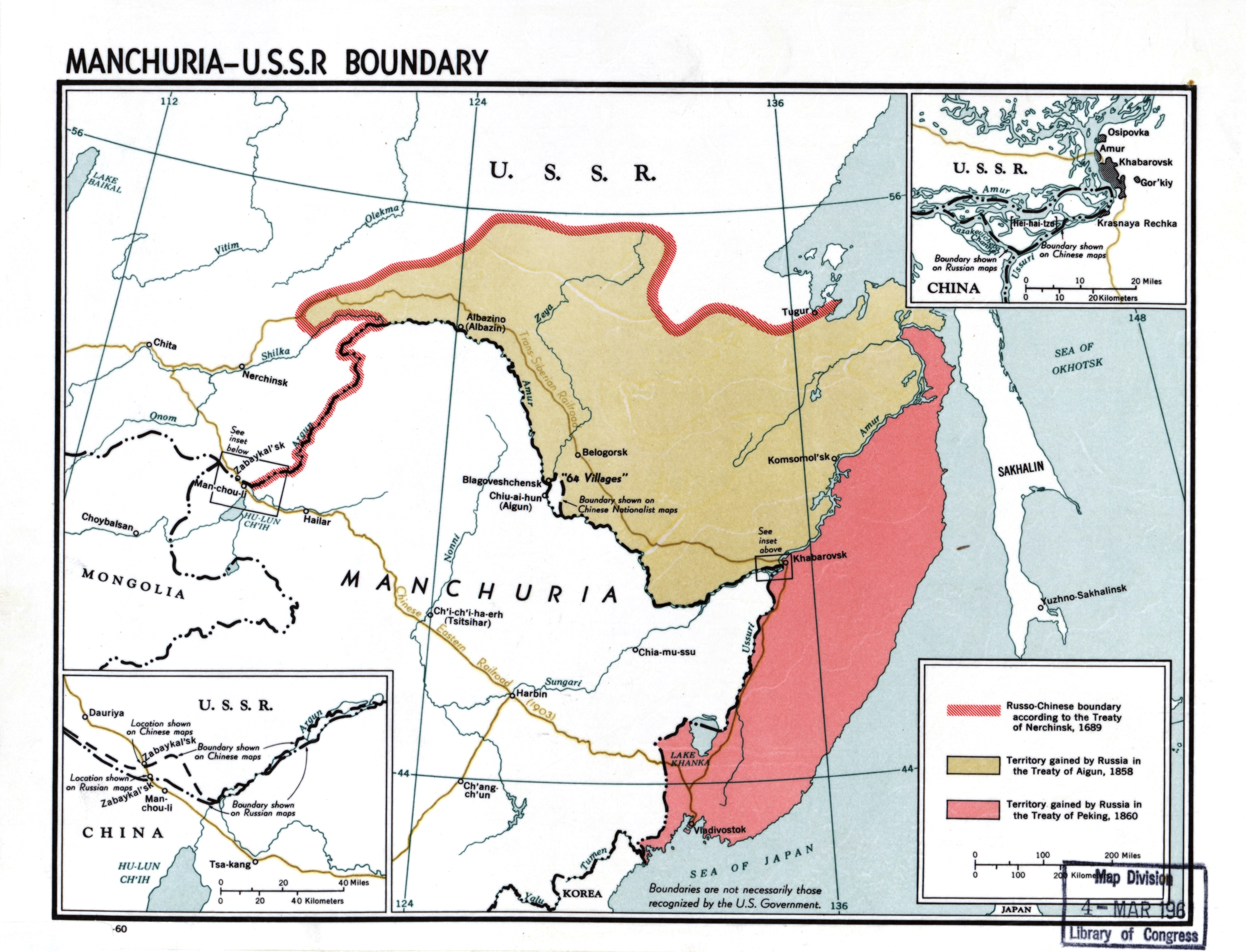
- Changes to the China–Russia border in the 19th century. Territory ceded to Russia in the Treaty of Aigun is shown in yellow.
- Signed: May 28, 1858
- Location: Aigun, Manchuria, China
- Signatories: (Qing dynasty) Yishan; (Russian Empire) Nikolay Muravyov
- Parties: (Qing dynasty) China; (Russian Empire) Russia
- Language: Russian, Manchu, Mongolian

Treaty of Aigun

Chinese name
- Traditional Chinese: 璦琿條約
- Simplified Chinese: 瑷珲条约
Transcriptions
Standard Mandarin
- Hanyu Pinyin: Àihún tiáoyuē

Russian name
- Russian: Айгунский договор
- Romanization: Aygunskiy dogovor

The Treaty of Aigun was an 1858 treaty between the Russian Empire and Qing dynasty of China. Yishan, official of the Qing, signed it on behalf of the Qing. It established much of the modern border between the Russian Far East and China by ceding much of Manchuria (the ancestral homeland of the Manchu people), now known as Northeast China. Negotiations began after China was threatened with war on a second front by Governor-General of the Far East Nikolay Muraviev when China was suppressing the Taiping Rebellion. It reversed the Treaty of Nerchinsk (1689) by transferring the land between the Stanovoy Range and the Amur River from the Qing dynasty to the Russian Empire. Russia received over 600,000 square kilometers (231,660 sq mi) of what became known as Outer Manchuria. While the Qing government initially refused to recognize the validity of the treaty, the Russian gains under the Treaty of Aigun were affirmed as part of the 1860 Sino-Russian Convention of Peking.

== Background ==
Since the reign of Catherine the Great (1762–1796), Russian emperors had desired to make Russia a naval power in the Pacific. They gradually achieved their goals by annexing the Kamchatka Peninsula and establishing the naval outpost of Petropavlovsk-Kamchatsky in 1740, naval outposts in Russian America and near the Amur watershed, encouraging Russians to go there and settle, and slowly developing a strong military presence in the Amur region.

From 1850 to 1864, when China was heavily involved in suppressing the Taiping Rebellion, and Governor-General of the Far East Nikolay Muraviev camped tens of thousands of troops on the borders of Mongolia and Manchuria, preparing to make legal Russian de facto control over the Amur from past settlement. Muraviev seized the opportunity when it was clear that China was losing the Second Opium War (1856–1860), and threatened China with a war on a second front. The Qing dynasty agreed to enter negotiations with Russia.

== Signing ==
The Russian general Muraviev and the Qing official Yishan, both military governors of the area, signed the treaty on May 28, 1858, in the town of Aigun. The Qing government initially refused to ratify the treaty and considered the treaty invalid, but in 1860 the Sino-Russian Convention of Peking affirmed Russian gains under the Treaty of Aigun and also ceded Primorye and the Ussuri region to the Russians.

== Effects ==
The resulting treaty established a border between the Russian and Chinese Empires along the Amur River. (Chinese and Manchu residents of the Sixty-Four Villages East of the River would be allowed to remain, under the jurisdiction of Manchu government.) The Amur, Sungari, and Ussuri rivers were to be open exclusively to both Chinese and Russian ships. The territory bounded on the west by the Ussuri, on the north by the Amur, and on the east and south by the Sea of Japan was to be jointly administered by Russia and China—a "condominium" arrangement similar to that which the British and Americans had agreed upon for the Oregon Territory in the Treaty of 1818. (Russia gained sole control of this land two years later.)

1. The inhabitants along the Amur, Sungari, and Ussuri rivers were to be allowed to trade with each other.
2. The Russians would retain Russian and Manchu copies of the text, and the Chinese would retain Manchu and Mongolian copies of the text.
3. All restrictions on trade were to be lifted along the border.

== Perception in China ==
In China, the treaty has been denounced as an unequal treaty.

In September 2024, the President of the Republic of China (Taiwan) Lai Ching-te claimed that if China's claims on Taiwan are about territorial integrity then it should also take back land from Russia signed over by the last Chinese dynasty in the 19th century, mentioning the treaty.

== See also ==
- 1860 French annexation of Savoy – Union of Savoy departments and Haute-Savoie
- Amur Annexation – Russian annexation of Outer Manchuria
- Convention of Peking – 1860 unequal treaty between Qing China and Britain, France, and Russia
- Outer Manchuria – Historical region in Northeast Asia
- Sino-Russian border conflicts – Series of conflicts between China and Russia
- Unequal Treaties – Series of treaties imposed on Asian states
- Western imperialism in Asia
