= Count Valentin Esterhazy =

French soldier, aristocrat, ambassador (1740–1805)

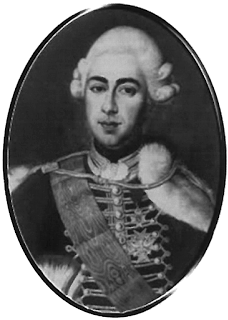
- Born: Valentin-Ladislas Esterházy; October 22, 1740; Le Vigan, Gard, France
- Died: July 23, 1805 (aged 64); Gródek Castle, Volhynia, Russian Empire
- Occupations: Soldier, ambassador
- Spouse: Marie-Françoise-Ursule de Hallweil (m. 1784–1805)
- Children: 4, including Gaspard-Philippe-Valentin d'Esterházy
- Parents: Valentin-Joseph Esterházy (father); Philippine de Nougarède (mother)
- House: House of Esterházy
- Military career
- Allegiance: Kingdom of France

Valentin-Ladislas, Comte d'Esterházy (October 22, 1740 – July 23, 1805) was a French soldier and aristocrat of Hungarian extraction. A career soldier, he became a close friend of the French queen Marie Antoinette, who showered him with favors at court. During the French Revolution, he followed Louis XVI's younger brothers, the Comte d'Artois and the Comte de Provence, into exile. In 1791, he was sent as the princes' ambassador to the court of Catherine the Great of Russia.

== Early life and family ==
Valentin-Ladislas, Count Esterházy of Galantha and of Grodeck, was born in the commune of Le Vigan, Gard on 22 October 1740. He was the son of Valentin-Joseph Esterházy, a member of the illustrious Hungarian noble house Esterházy, and Philippine de Nougarède de la Garde. His grandfather, Comte Antoine Esterházy, had been one of the principal lieutenants of Francis II Rákóczi, a Hungarian prince who led a war of independence against the Habsburg Empire. Antoine Esterházy followed Rákóczi into exile on the Black Sea, where he died. His son Valentin-Joseph, however, moved to France to take command of a company in a regiment of fellow Hungarian exiles formed by the son of another of Rákóczi's lieutenants, the Comte de Bercheny. In 1735, Valentin-Joseph in turn formed his own regiment of hussards known as the régiment Hussards-Esterhazy. He married Philippine de Nougarède, who came from an old military family in Vigan, and whom he met during a stay there while travelling to Beaucaire.

Valentin-Joseph died in 1743 in Alsace, after being wounded in the Battle of Dettingen. His family was left in poverty. His widow went to Versailles to seek aid, but was only able to reclaim half of her husbands' 3,000 franc pension. In 1749, she moved the family to Paris, hoping to find support from her husband's old friends and allies. The Comte de Bercheny agreed to adopt Valentin, provide for his education, and give him a place in his regiment.

=== Marriage & children ===
In 1784, Esterházy married Marie-Françoise-Ursule de Hallweil, the daughter of a count and Lieutenant-General of the Armies of the King. The couple had four children:

- Gaspard-Philippe-Valentin d'Esterházy de Galantha et de Grodeck (1786-1838)
- Ladislas-Henri-Valentin d'Esterházy de Galantha (b. 1797)
- Marie-Françoise-Léonide d'Esterházy de Galantha (b. 1787)
- Marie-Anne-Everilde-Ursule d'Esterházy de Galantha (b. 10 February 1791)

=== Relationship with Marie Antoinette ===
Esterházy first met Marie Antoinette in 1770, when he was charged with bringing a portrait of her betrothed, the future Louis XVI, to the then-Archduchess in Vienna. Four years later, Esterházy requested a letter of recommendation to Marie Antoinette from her mother Queen Maria Theresa. Maria Theresa refused, but did authorize the Austrian ambassador to France to recommend Esterházy to Marie Antoinette, who, remembering him as the man who delivered her husband's portrait in 1770, received him 'with great pleasure'.

According to Ernest Daudet, Marie Antoinette "openly protected him, defended him against his rivals, recommended him to the King, whom she got to love him, obtained for him, in a circumstance where he was in debt, 600 louis, a pension upon his marriage, some grand posts; she aided, in a word, as much as she could, in his fortune, good deeds which he received with recognition and paid for with a devotion which the unhappiness of his sovereigns, far from slackening it, caused to excite." However, Maria Theresa never quite forgave Esterházy for his grandfather's part in the Hungarian insurrection against Habsburg rule. She was shocked by the intimacy of Esterházy and Marie Antoinette's letters to each other, writing on one occasion that "the correspondence with that runt d'Esterhazy is very humiliating." In 1778, when he was chosen to deliver the news to Maria Theresa that her daughter had gone into labor with her first child, the Austrian queen wrote that "Esterhazy is in no way suitable for being sent here with such great news. His family is not illustrious, and he is always regarded as a refugee."

In April 1779, the Queen went to the Petit Trianon to recover from the measles, and Esterházy was one of four gentlemen whom Louis XVI authorized to attend her there. This caused much gossip at Versailles, giving rise to "the malicious insinuations" of sexual immorality which would plague Marie Antoinette for the rest of her life. In 1784, upon the occasion of his marriage, Marie Antoinette granted Esterházy an annual pension of 12,000 livres. In 1791, when the Queen was a "captive" at the Tuileries Palace, Esterházy passed letters and gifts from her to their mutual friend Count Axel von Fersen.

== Career ==
Esterházy became a lieutenant réformé at age 11 in Bercheny's regiment, then in 1756 became captain. He served in the Seven Years' War, fighting as part of the Légion royale in Germany. By 1761, when he was just 21 years old, he had been promoted to the rank of lieutenant-colonel.

In 1764, as recompense for having been deprived of the leadership of his father's hussards regiment, Valentin Esterházy was allowed to form his own régiment Hussards-Esterhazy and lead it as Mestre de camp. In 1775, during the popular uprising known as the Flour War, Esterházy reestablished order with his regiment in the province of Brie. In 1780 he was appointed to the rank of General and the next year became the military governor of Rocroi. He also served as second commander of the County of Hainaut. In 1787, he was appointed as one of eight members of a Council of War by Louis XVI. The honors he received included an appointment as a Chevalier des Ordres du Roi (Knight of the Orders of the King) in 1784 and also a Chevalier of the Order of Saint Louis.

=== French Revolution & life in Russia ===
At the beginning of the French Revolution, Esterházy was in charge of a garrison at Valenciennes. From there he assisted the Comte d'Artois, who came to him in disguise on July 18, 1789, to escape into Flanders under the escort of his hussars. Esterházy also helped to emigrate Artois' sons, the Duke of Angoulême and the Duc de Beri, as well as the Prince de Condé and his sons. Rumors of his royalist intrigues soon began to circulate and he was accused in the National Assembly. The Journal des révolutions de Paris accused him of wanting to pass grain to the enemy. He protested his innocence and published letters intended to exonerate him, one of which was written by the committee of the town of Le Quesnoy in October 1789, thanking him for keeping the peace and securing food for the province. Nonetheless, his soldiers mutinied in 1790 and forced him to flee the garrison. He went first to Paris, where he arranged for his family to emigrate to Britain. He also engaged in an unrealized conspiracy to free Louis XVI from the Tuileries Palace and conduct him to a royalist army.

In 1791, he departed France to join the Comte d'Artois in Koblenz. He followed Artois to Vienna and gained the prince's confidence during the negotiations at Pillnitz Castle which resulted in the Holy Roman Empire and Prussia formally declaring their support for Louis XVI and their opposition to the Revolution. Esterházy was then sent by the princes as ambassador to the court of Catherine the Great in St. Petersburg, arriving there in September, 1791. He soon found himself in favor with the Empress, who gifted him the estate of Luka, in Russian Poland, in 1795. Catherine also made Esterházy's son, only 7 years old, a Cornet in her horse guards. After her death, her son Paul I evicted Esterházy from Luka and returned the property to its previous owner. He also revoked Esterházy's accreditation as ambassador at the Russian court. However, Paul I did not leave Esterházy completely dispossessed - he granted him an estate at Gródek Castle in Volhynia. Esterházy learned that he was out of favor with Paul I because years earlier he had spurned a friendship with him. He wrote to the Comte de Provence that:

"I have at last learned that he [Paul I] had been shocked that after having shown me so many kindnesses as those which he had for me in 1792, I had distanced myself from him and absolutely rejected him from his mother's side. But, sire, my situation was very delicate in that time; the little understanding which there was between the Empress and her son at that time was known by everyone. By what means could an individual, and above all a foreigner, long be in the intimacy of both? I felt that it was absolutely necessary to expose myself to losing the confidence of one of the two, and I did not hesitate upon the choice: I seized the first instance where I noticed a little coldness in the Grand-Duke, to present myself to him from then on with no more than the respect due to his rank and like the rest of the court. I saw that this displeased him; he ceased to treat me well, and even to speak to me. But I preferred that to giving some suspicion to the Empress who heaped kindnesses and I dare say friendship on me, or to those in whom she placed her confidence."

Esterházy died at Grodék Castle on July 23, 1805.

== Bibliography ==
- Mathieu Aubert (2007). "Valentin Esterházy, l'usage d'un monde" (in French). Budapest: Öt Kontinens. pp. 31–40.
- Daudé, Romain (2023) Le comte Valentin Esterházy et la représentation diplomatique des émigrés en Russie, 1791-1796, d’après les lettres originales adressées à sa femme et divers documents manuscrits, Thèse de Doctorat en Histoire moderne, sous la direction de Mme Marie Blaise et de M. Pierre-Yves Kirschleger, Université Paul Valéry-Montpellier3. 818p.
- Ernest Daudet, ed. (1907). Lettres du comte Valentin Esterhazy À Sa Femme 1784-1792 (in French). Paris: Librairie Plon.
- Ernest Daudet, ed. (1909). Nouvelles Lettres du comte Valentin Esterhazy À Sa Femme 1792-1795 (in French). Paris: Librairie Plon.
- Valentin Esterhazy (1905). Mémoires du Comte Valentin Esterhazy Avec Une Introduction et Des Notes Par Ernest Daudet (in French). Paris: Librairie Plon.
- Tóth, Ferenc (1999) "The French Émigrés in Europe", The French Emigres in Europe and the Struggle Against Revolution, 1789-1814. London: Palgrave Macmillan UK; pp. 69–70.
