= Natalyino =

Natalyino Натальино
- Selo
- Location within Amur Oblast Location within Russia
- Coordinates: 50°38′N 127°49′E
- Country: Russia
- Region: Amur Oblast
- District: Blagoveshchensky District
- Time zone: UTC+9:00

Natalyino (Russian: Натальино) is a rural locality (a selo) in Natalyinsky Selsoviet of Blagoveshchensky District, Amur Oblast, Russia. The population was 303 as of 2018. There are 5 streets.

== Geography ==
Natalyino is located on the right bank of the Zeya River, 91 km north of Blagoveshchensk (the district's administrative centre) by road. Svetilovka is the nearest rural locality.
