= Peredovoye =

Peredovoye Передовое
- Selo
- Location within Amur Oblast Location within Russia
- Coordinates: 50°07′N 127°43′E
- Country: Russia
- Region: Amur Oblast
- District: Blagoveshchensky District
- Time zone: UTC+9:00

Peredovoye (Russian: Передовое) is a rural locality (a selo) in Gribsky Selsoviet of Blagoveshchensky District, Amur Oblast, Russia. The population was 181 as of 2018. There are 8 streets.

== Geography ==
Peredovoye is located 37 km southeast of Blagoveshchensk (the district's administrative centre) by road. Udobnoye is the nearest rural locality.
