= Gribskoye =

Gribskoye Грибское
- Selo
- Location within Amur Oblast Location within Russia
- Coordinates: 50°14′N 127°46′E
- Country: Russia
- Region: Amur Oblast
- District: Blagoveshchensky District
- Time zone: UTC+9:00

Gribskoye (Russian: Грибское) is a rural locality (a selo) and the administrative center of Gribskoy Selsoviet of Blagoveshchensky District, Amur Oblast, Russia. The population was 1,000 as of 2018. There are 36 streets.

== Geography ==
Gribskoye is located 28 km southeast of Blagoveshchensk (the district's administrative centre) by road. Volkovo is the nearest rural locality.
