= Kanton-Kommuna =

Kanton-Kommuna Кантон-Коммуна
- Selo
- Location within Amur Oblast Location within Russia
- Coordinates: 50°24′N 127°32′E
- Country: Russia
- Region: Amur Oblast
- District: Blagoveshchensky District
- Time zone: UTC+9:00

Kanton-Kommuna (Russian: Кантон-Коммуна) is a rural locality (a selo) in Novotroitsky Selsoviet of Blagoveshchensky District, Amur Oblast, Russia. The population was 136 as of 2018. There are 17 streets.

== Geography ==
Kanton-Kommuna is located on the left bank of the Amur River, 19 km north of Blagoveshchensk (the district's administrative centre) by road. Chigiri is the nearest rural locality.
