= Russian invasion of Manchuria =

1900 military conflict in East Asia

- Part of the Boxer Rebellion
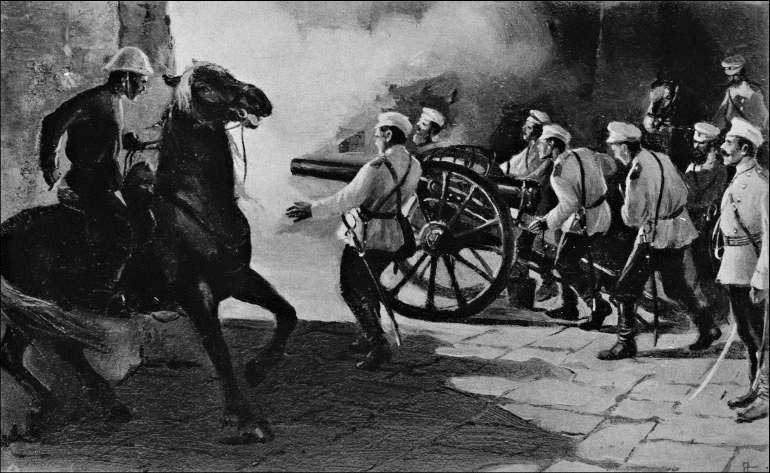
- Russian cannons firing at Beijing gates during the Battle of Peking, 14 August 1900
Date	June – November 1900
Location	Manchuria, China
Result	Russian victory

Belligerents
Russian Empire	Boxers; China

Commanders and leaders
(Russian Empire) Yevgeni Alekseyev (Russian Empire) Dyean Subotich (Russian Empire) Konstantin Tserpitsky (Russian Empire) Pavel Mishchenko (Russian Empire) Nikolay Orlov	(Qing dynasty) Shoushan (a descendant of Yuan Chonghuan)

Strength
58,000–100,000 Imperial Russian Army soldiers and Cossacks	Manchu Bannermen, Boxers, Honghuzi bandits

Casualties and losses
242 killed, 1,283 wounded (per Russian sources)	Unknown, at least in the thousands

The Russian invasion of Manchuria or Chinese expedition (Russian: Китайская экспедиция) occurred in the aftermath of the First Sino-Japanese War (1894–1895) when concerns regarding Qing China's defeat by the Empire of Japan, and Japan's brief occupation of Liaodong, caused the Russian Empire to speed up their long held designs for imperial expansion across Eurasia.

In the five years preceding the invasion, the Russian Empire established a network of leased territories in Manchuria. This began with the Triple Intervention in 1895. From 1898, after which Russia received Liaotung from Japan, it built and operated the Chinese Eastern Railway (CER). As with all other major powers in China, Russia demanded concessions along with the railroad, enforced through unequal treaties.

With the building of a southern branch of the CER (later the South Manchuria Railway), Mukden (now known as Shenyang) became a Russian stronghold. During the Boxer Rebellion, the Russian military temporarily evacuated from and immediately reoccupied Mukden.

The Russian Empire's full invasion of Manchuria occurred concurrent with its participation against the Boxer Rebellion. The pretext of the invasion was the defense of the railroad against Boxer rebels.

Russia became involved in the Eight Nation Alliance due to its presence in the foreign legations. Russian Cossacks formed part of the relief forces during the Seymour and Gaselee expeditions while Russian forces were also present inside the legations during the sieges in Beijing and Tianjin. These forces operated separately from those involved in the invasion of Manchuria, with the entire Manchuria operation exclusively directed by Russians.

The invasion concluded with the full occupation of Manchuria by Russia, causing tensions that led to the Russo-Japanese War.

== Campaign ==
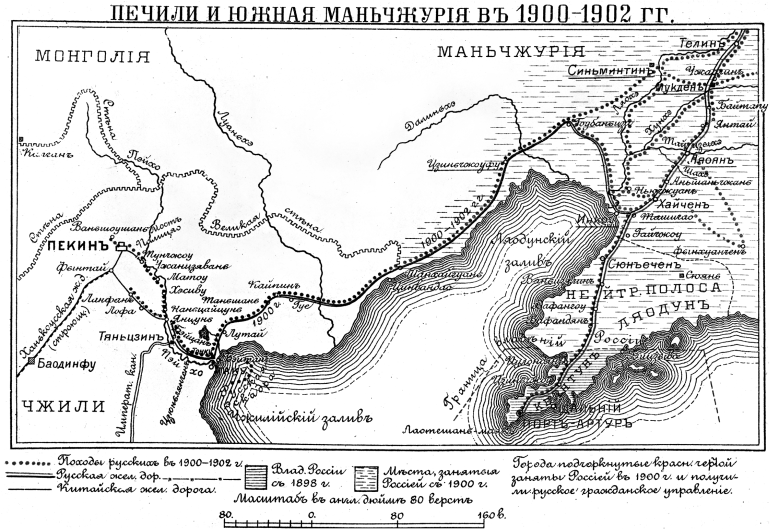
Campaigns of Russian troops in China, 1900

The Russians invaded Manchuria during the rebellion, which was defended by Manchu bannermen. The bannermen were annihilated as they fought to the death against the Russians, each falling one at a time against a five pronged Russian invasion. The Russian anthropologist Sergei Mikhailovich Shirokogorov reported that the Russians killed many of the Manchus, thousands of them fled south. The Cossacks looted their villages and property and then burnt them down. Manchuria was completely occupied after the fierce fighting that occurred.

== Boxers attacks on Chinese Eastern Railway ==
The Boxers attacks on the Chinese Eastern Railway during the Boxer Rebellion took place in 1900. In response Russia invaded Manchuria.

Chinese Imperial troops engaged in attacks against Russians, in one incident, Chinese troops killed a cossack. Another 15 Russian casualties occurred when Chinese cavalry attacked the Russians. The Boxers destroyed railways and cut lines for telegraphs. The Yen-t'ai coal mines were burned by Chinese forces.

The Chinese used arson to destroy a bridge carrying a railway and a barracks in the 27th of July.

The Boxers destroyed railways in Manchuria in a strategic manoeuvre to halt enemy soldiers from moving. Imperial edicts were posted which called for attacks against the Russians, the stations of the South Manchuria Railway came under Boxer control.

With the building of the South Manchuria Railway, Mukden became a Russian stronghold, which occupied it after the Boxer Rebellion.

After Russia invaded with regular troops, the railway came under Russian control again.

== Defence of Yingkou ==
The Battle of Yingkou was a battle where Chinese forces battled against the invading Russian army in the Boxer Rebellion. Unlike the battles in China proper during the Boxer Rebellion, battles between Chinese and foreigners in Manchuria were exclusively between Chinese and Russians. The Russians were the sole force attacking Yingkou, at the time one of the main sea ports of Manchuria.

Yingkou was divided into a foreign settlement and a Chinese city. Mishchenko had to engage his reserved troops to win the fight. When the Russians seized the city, a number of Boxers and Chinese Imperial troops managed to pull off an evacuation. A combination of a moat, precipitation, and mud hampered the movement of Russian troops and their guns.

== Battle of Pai-t'ou-tzu ==
The Battle of Pai-t'ou-tzu (Pinyin: Baitouzi) was an engagement during the Boxer Rebellion between regular Chinese Imperial forces and an outpost of Russian infantry located in Chinese territory. Even before the Boxer rising against foreign influence, an outpost of Russian troops had been located across the Chinese border near the village of Pai-t'ou-tzu, which lay close to Liaoyang. It was garrisoned by 204 Russian troops under Colonel Mishchenko. When hostilities began, the Chinese authorities advanced a guarantee of safe passage in exchange for his retreat to the south of Liaoyang. This was declined, and instead Mishchenko called for more Russian troops to reinforce his position.

Before the Russian position could be reinforced, fighting broke out. During the opening stages of the ensuing battle, Chinese guns bombarded the Russian right and front flanks, resulting in 14 Russian deaths and 5 wounded. Firing from long range at high trajectories, the Chinese artillery hit their marks, but at closer range proved inaccurate. Chinese regular infantry armed with rifles advanced, crawling under cover artillery fire towards the Russian defense perimeter of about 350 square feet. When the Russian fire slackened the Chinese troops renewed their attack. Chinese forces alternated between advance and retreat until the Russian position was over-run. Losses on both sides are uncertain but the Russian detachment may have been wiped out.

== Battles on Amur River ==
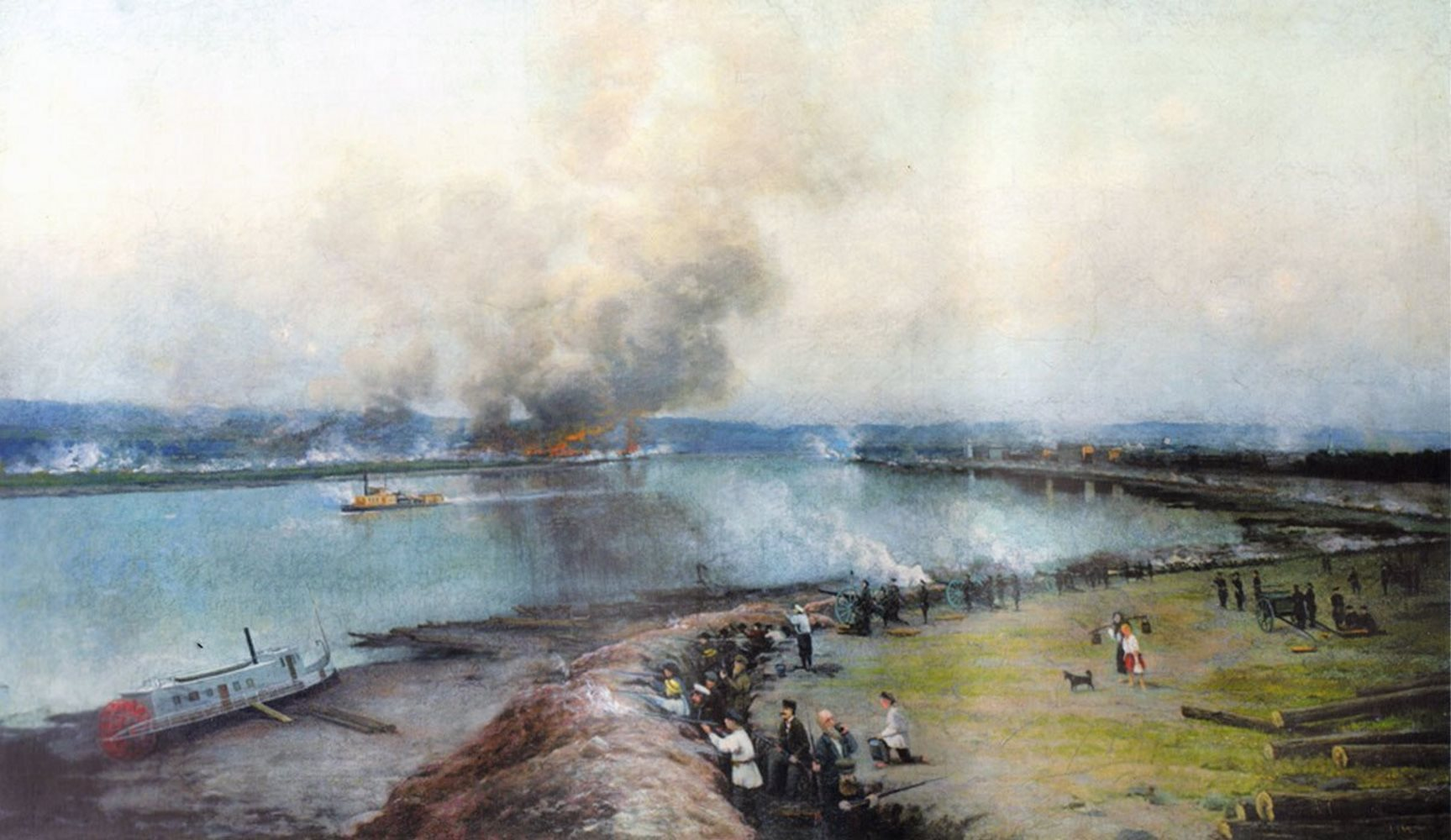
Defence of Blagoveshchensk

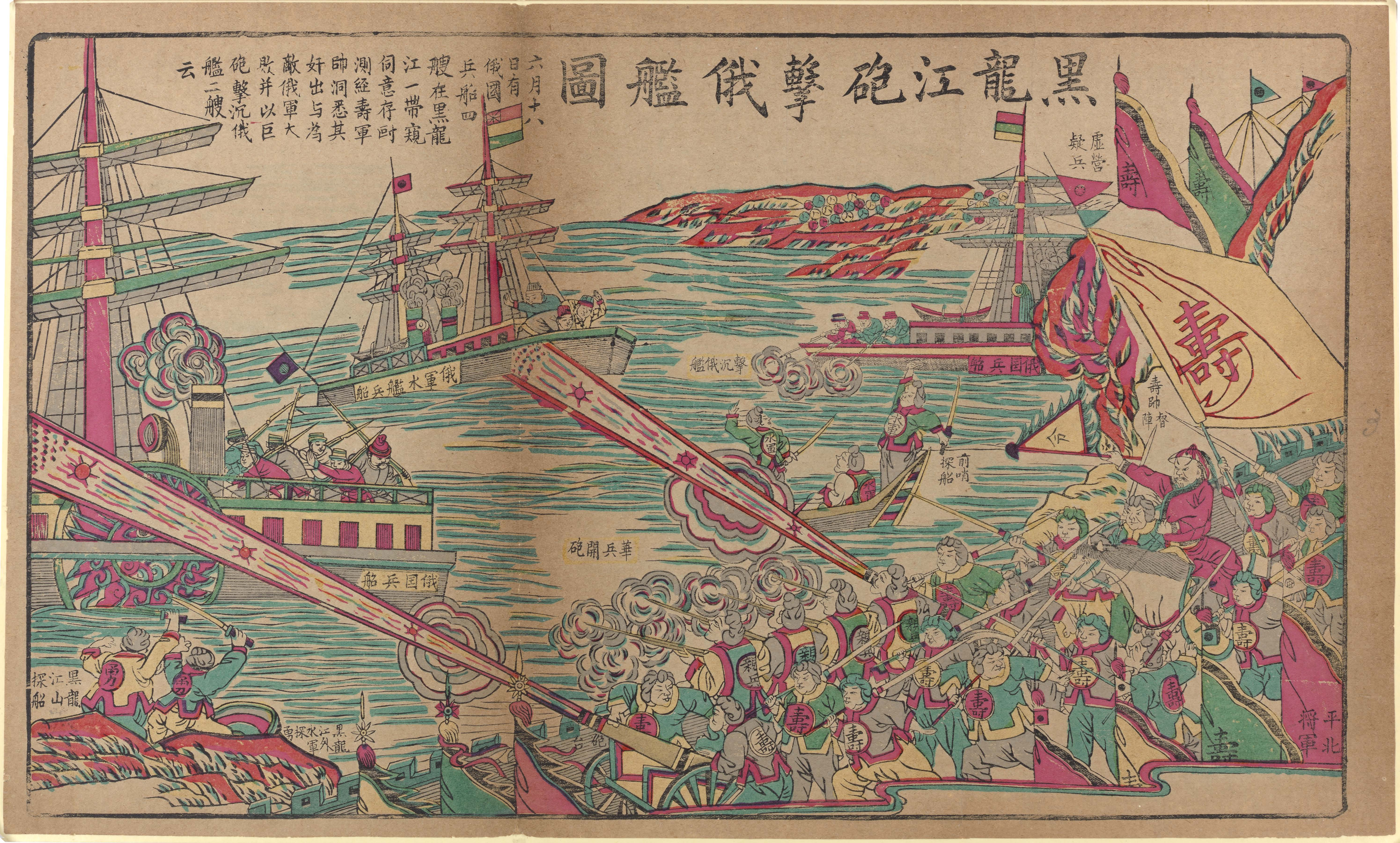
Fighting for control over the Amur River

The Battles on the Amur River were border clashes between Chinese Imperial Army troops along with Boxers against Russian forces who aimed for control over the Amur River for navigation.

The Chinese summoned all available men to fight, and the Chinese forces and garrisons gathered artillery and bombarded Russian troops and towns across the Amur. Despite the Cossacks repulsing Chinese army crossings into Russia, the Chinese army troops increased the amount of artillery and kept up the bombardment. In revenge for the attacks on Chinese villages, Boxer troops burned Russian towns and almost annihilated a Russian force at Tieling.

Russian governor K. N. Gribsky ordered Cossacks to destroy all Chinese posts on Amur river, and Cossacks completed the order during July. On July 20, Russian forces (including 16 infantry companies, a hundred Cossacks and 16 cannons) crossed the Amur near Blagoveshchensk with support from the steamers Selenga and Sungari. On July 20, Russian troops captured Saghalien; on July 22, Aigun.

After the victory over the Chinese forces, the general-governor of Amur Region, Nikolai Grodekov, decided to annex the right bank of the Amur River, and sent a telegram to St. Peterburg, but Russian Minister of War Aleksey Kuropatkin forbade such an action:

Because of restoring the good relation with China in the nearest future, His Majesty decided not to annex any part of China

== Russian invasion of Northern and Central Manchuria ==
The Crushing of Boxers in Northern and Central Manchuria was the invasion of the 100,000-strong Russian Army of Manchuria. These events form part of the period known as the Boxer Rebellion.

On June 29 (1900), the first Russian force—two rifle regiments and some Cossacks from Khabarovsk—crossed the Chinese border, followed by units from Blagoveshchensk, Nikolsk-Ussuriski, and other towns.

The campaign in Manchuria was conducted by both the regular Imperial army, including Manchu Bannermen and Imperial Chinese troops, and the Boxers.

The Russians invaded Manchuria during the rebellion, which was defended by Manchu bannermen. The bannermen were annihilated as they fought to the death against the Russians, each falling one at a time against a five pronged Russian invasion. The Russians killed many of the Manchus, thousands of them fled south. The Russian Cossacks looted some of their villages and property and then burnt them to ashes, but as revenge, the Chinese Boxers and Imperial army came to a large Russian village and killed many civilians and looted and burnt all their houses and killed many Russian defenders. Manchuria was partially occupied after the fierce fighting that occurred.

== Aftermath ==
By November 1900 most of Manchuria was secured by the Russian forces. War Minister General Kuropatkin reported that Russian losses were 22 officers and 220 men killed, along with 60 officers and 1,223 men wounded. No records exist for Chinese losses, but estimates put them at much higher than Russian casualties. Lieutenant General Nikolai Linevich, for example, gave orders to destroy towns and execute Chinese in retaliation for attacks on the Russian railway in Manchuria. This policy was later changed and at least eight Cossacks were executed by hanging by a military court for crimes against civilians.

Many Manchu Bannermen supported the Boxers and shared their anti-foreign sentiment. The German ambassador Clemens von Ketteler was assassinated by a Manchu. Manchu bannermen had been devastated in the First Sino-Japanese War in 1895 and Banner armies were destroyed while resisting the invasion. In the words of historian Pamela Crossley, their living conditions went "from desperate poverty to true misery." When thousands of Manchus fled south from Aigun during the fighting in 1900, their cattle and horses were stolen by Russian Cossacks who then burned their villages and homes to ashes. The clan system of the Manchus in Aigun was obliterated by the despoliation of the area at the hands of the Russians.

Much of the fighting in the Boxer Rebellion against the foreigners in defense of Beijing and Manchuria was done by Manchu Banner armies, which were destroyed while resisting the invasion. Manchu banner garrisons were annihilated on 5 roads by Russians as they suffered most of the casualties. Manchu Shoufu killed himself during the battle of Peking and the Manchu Lao She's father was killed by western soldiers in the battle as the Manchu banner armies of the Center Division of the Guards Army, Tiger Spirit Division and Peking Field force in the Metropolitan banners were slaughtered by the western soldiers. Baron von Ketteler, the German diplomat was murdered by Captain Enhai, a Manchu from the Tiger Spirit Division of Aisin Gioro Zaiyi, Prince Duan and the Inner city Legation Quarters and Catholic cathedral were both attacked by Manchu bannermen. Manchu bannermen were slaughtered by the Eight Nation Alliance all over Manchuria and Beijing because most of the Manchu bannermen supported the Boxers in the Boxer rebellion. The clan system of the Manchus in Aigun was obliterated by the despoliation of the area at the hands of the Russian invaders. There were 1,266 households including 900 Daurs and 4,500 Manchus in Sixty-Four Villages East of the River and Blagoveshchensk until the 1900 Amur anti-Chinese pogroms committed by Russian Cossack soldiers. Many Manchu villages were burned by Cossacks in the massacre according to Victor Zatsepine.

Sergei Witte advised the Tsar to withdraw Russian forces from Manchuria, but Kuropatkin advocated for a continued Russian presence in Manchuria. The Russians tried to secure agreements favorable to themselves in exchange for withdrawal, but China refused.

The Honghuzi continued to plague Manchuria despite multiple attempts aiming for their eradication and mass killings directed at them by Cossack forces. They were enlisted by the Japanese during the Russo-Japanese War to attack the Russians on their rear.

== See also ==
- Sixty-Four Villages East of the River
- Korean invasion of Manchuria
