= Blagoveshchensk–Heihe Bridge =

Bridge that connects China and Russia by the Amur River

Coordinates: 50°12′04″N 127°35′58″E

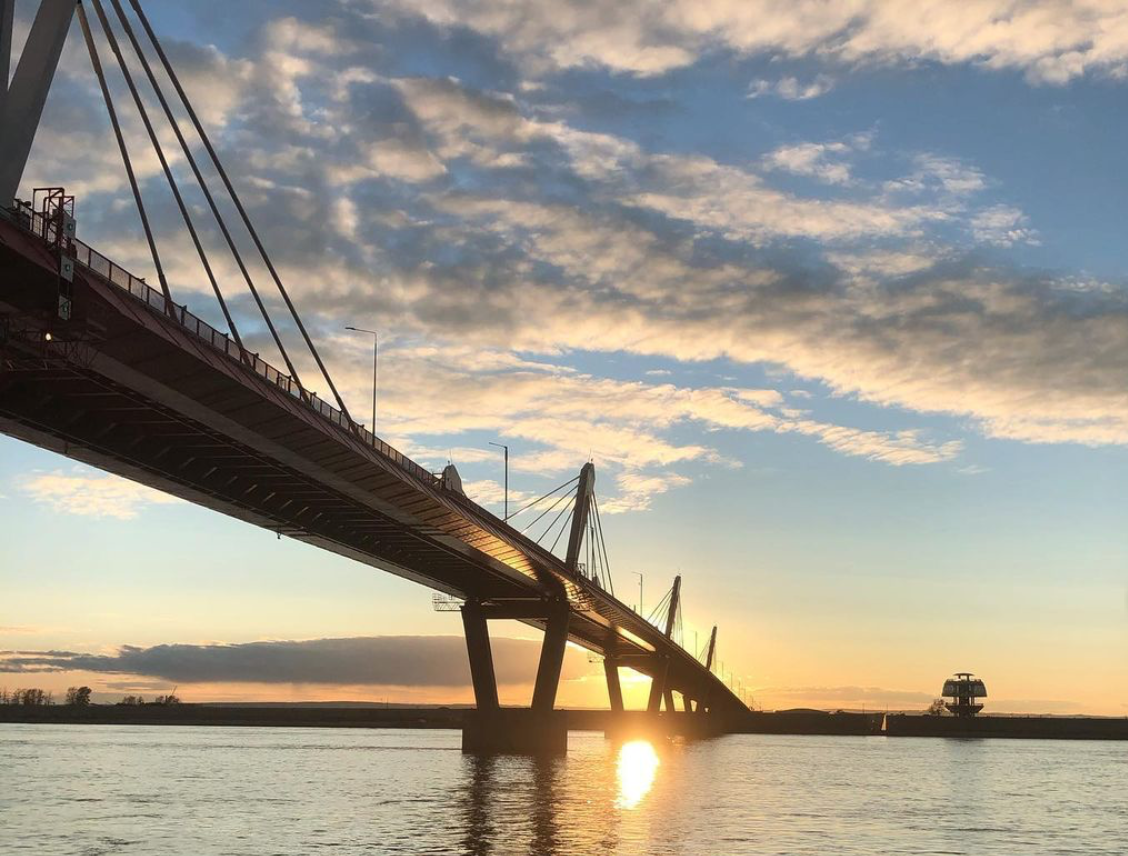
View to the bridge

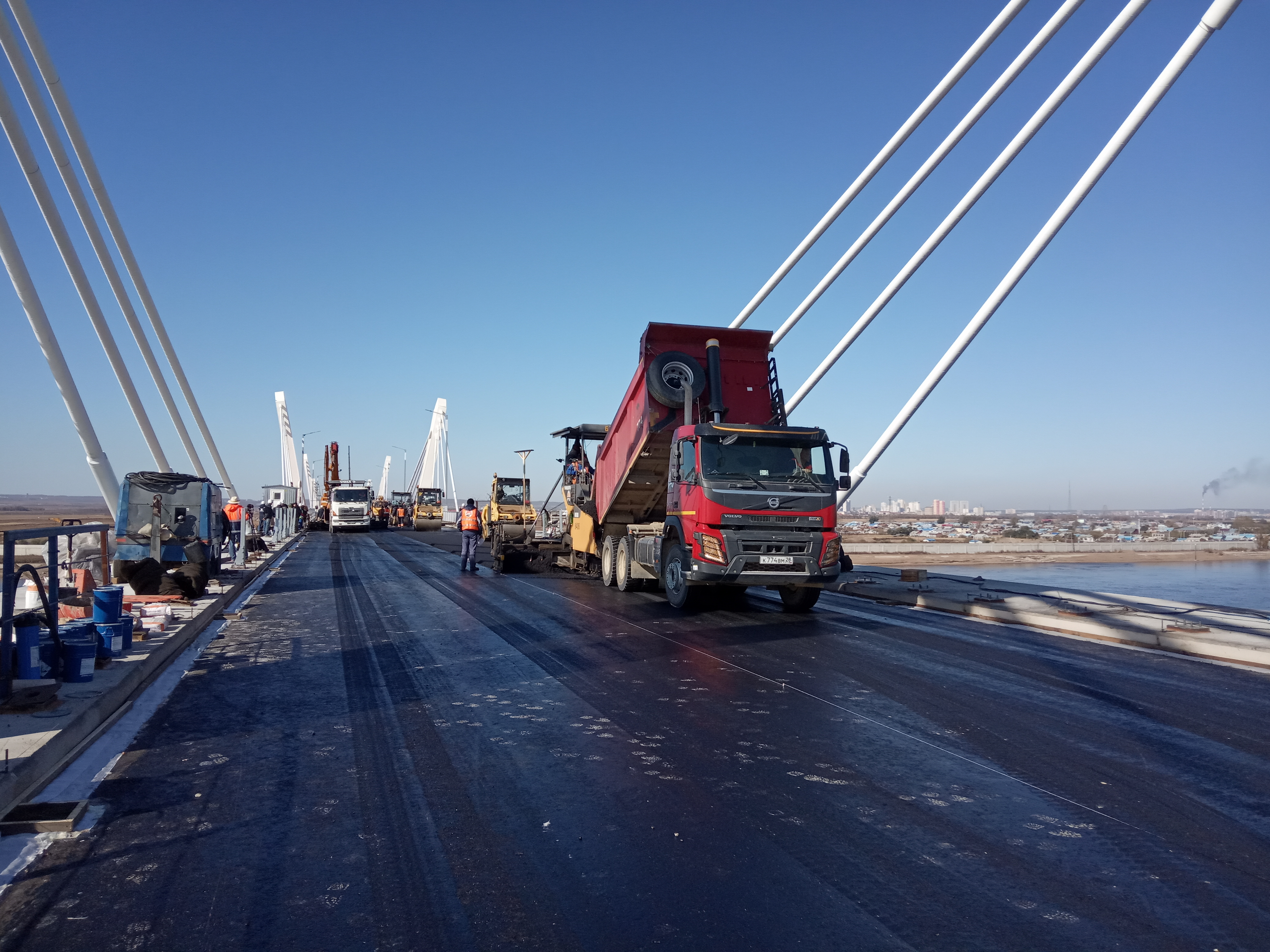
Asphalting on the bridge

The Blagoveshchensk–Heihe Bridge (Russian: мост Благовещенск — Хэйхэ; Chinese: 黑河－布拉戈维申斯克界河公路大桥) is a bridge across the Amur River, connecting the cities of Blagoveshchensk, Russia, and Heihe, China. According to CNN, the construction of the bridge started in 2016 and was completed in late 2019. It was estimated that the bridge cost 19 billion rubles (around 342 million US dollars as of 2022). Passing vehicles pay a toll.

Highways map with bridge (2022)

A video of the bridge

Regular bridge traffic started on June 10, 2022. The new crossing between China and Russia was initially available only for freight traffic. The bridge opened for passenger vehicles on January 2, 2025.

In 2024, around 200 trucks crossed the bridge daily.

== See also ==
- List of international bridges
