= Grodekovo, Amur Oblast =

Grodekovo Гродеково
- Selo
- Location within Amur Oblast Location within Russia
- Coordinates: 50°07′18″N 127°34′39″E
- Country: Russia
- Region: Amur Oblast
- District: Blagoveshchensky District
- Time zone: UTC+9:00

Grodekovo (Russian: Гродеково) is a rural locality (a selo) and the administrative center of Grodekovsky Selsoviet of Blagoveshchensky District, Amur Oblast, Russia. The population was 523 as of 2018. There are 10 streets.

== Geography ==
Grodekovo is located on the left bank of the Amur River, 36 km south of Blagoveshchensk (the district's administrative centre) by road. Nikolayevka is the nearest rural locality.
