= 1900 Amur anti-Chinese pogroms =

1900 pogroms of Qing dynasty subjects in Blagoveshchensk, Russian Empire

1900 Amur anti-Chinese pogroms Gengzi Russian disaster
- Part of the Russian invasion of Manchuria
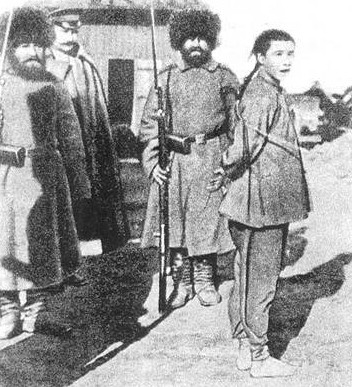
- In the Blagoveshchensk massacre, a Qing civilian was tied for execution.
Date	17–21 July [O.S. 4–8 July] 1900
Location	Blagoveshchensk and the Sixty-Four Villages East of the River
Result	More than 3,000 Qing subjects killed; loss of residency for Chinese living in the Sixty-Four Villages East of the River
Territorial changes	Qing China loses control over the Sixty-Four Villages East of the River

Belligerents
Eight-Nation Alliance; Russian Empire	Boxer movement; Qing dynasty

Commanders and leaders
Aleksey Kuropatkin; Nikolay Grodekov	Shoushan (Note: a descendant of Yuan Chonghuan) (executed); Yang Fengxiang; Chong Kunshan; Wang Liangchen

Strength
36,000 Russian soldiers and Cossacks	22,000 civilians

Casualties and losses
None	198 officials died 7,000 Chinese citizens died

The 1900 Amur anti-Chinese pogroms (Chinese: 庚子俄難) were a series of ethnic killings (pogroms) and reprisals undertaken by the Russian Empire against subjects of the Qing dynasty of various ethnicities, including Manchu, Daur, and Han peoples. They took place in Blagoveshchensk and in the Sixty-Four Villages East of the River in the Amur region, during the same time as the Boxer Rebellion in China. The events ultimately resulted in thousands of deaths, the loss of residency for Chinese subjects living in the Sixty-Four Villages East of the River, and increased Russian control over the region. The Russian justification for the pogroms were attacks made on Russian infrastructure outside Blagoveshchensk by Chinese Boxers, which was then responded by Russian force. The pogroms themselves occurred in 17–21 July [O.S. 4–8 July] 1900.

== Name ==
The name for the killings and reprisals that occurred in Amur is not standardized, and has been referred to by different names over time. The most common Chinese name for the pogroms is the Gengzi Russian disaster (traditional Chinese: 庚子俄難; simplified Chinese: 庚子俄难; pinyin: Gēngzǐ é nán), but the two most major events in Blagoveshchensk and the Sixty-Four Villages East of the River are referred to as the Blagoveshchensk massacre (traditional Chinese: 海蘭泡慘案; simplified Chinese: 海兰泡惨案; pinyin: Hǎilánpào cǎn'àn) and the Sixty-Four Villages East of the River massacre (traditional Chinese: 江東六十四屯慘案; simplified Chinese: 江东六十四屯惨案; pinyin: Jiāngdōng liùshísì tún cǎn'àn) respectively.

The Russian name of the pogroms in Blagoveshchensk is referred to as the Chinese pogrom in Blagoveshchensk (Russian: китайский погром в Благовещенске), while the killings and reprisals that took place in the Sixty-Four Villages East of the River are referred to as the Battle on the Amur (Russian: бои на Амуре).

== Background ==
Blagoveshchensk was founded on the territory ceded to Russia by the Treaty of Aigun in 1858.

== Process ==
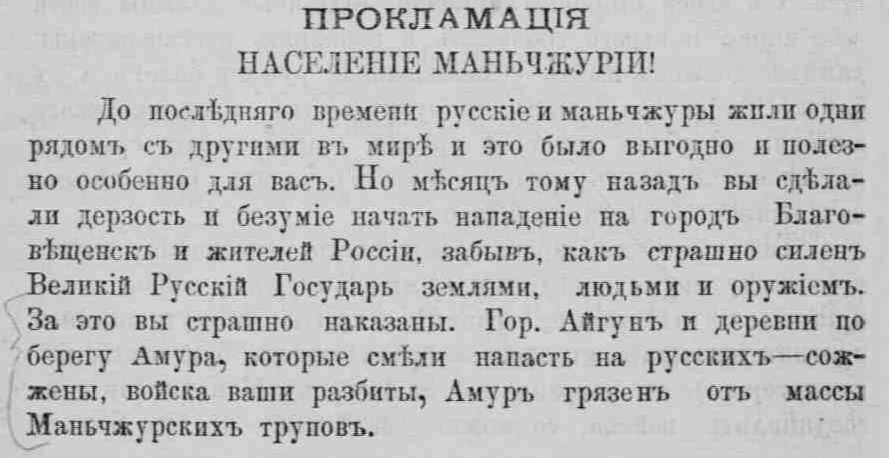
The introduction to Lieutenant-General Gribskiy's proclamation regarding his intended punishment of Chinese living in Blagoveshchensk and the Sixty-Four Villages East of the River

=== Sixty-Four Villages East of the River ===
Lieutenant-General Konstantin Gribskiy ordered the expulsion of all Qing subjects who remained north of the river. This included the residents of the villages, and Chinese traders and workers who lived in Blagoveshchensk proper, where they numbered anywhere between one-sixth and one-half of the local population of 30,000. They were taken by the local police and driven into the river to be drowned. Those who could swim were shot by the Russian forces. There were 1,266 households, including 900 Daurs and 4,500 Manchus in the area until the massacre. Many Manchu villages were burned by Cossacks in the massacre according to Victor Zatsepine.

== Legacy ==
Andrew Higgins of The New York Times wrote that Chinese and Russian officials tended to not bring up the incidents during periods of good China–Russia relations or Sino-Soviet relations, while the incident was brought up after the Sino-Soviet split with people still alive who had been in the pogroms being interviewed by Chinese officials. Higgins stated that in 2020 Chinese and Russian officials purposefully avoided dealing with the incident.
