= Amur State University =

- Амурский государственный университет
- Established: 1975
- Rector: Andrey Plutenko
- Location: 21 Ignatevskoye, Blagoveshchensk, Russia; 50.275°N 127.534°E
- Website: http://www.amursu.ru Building details
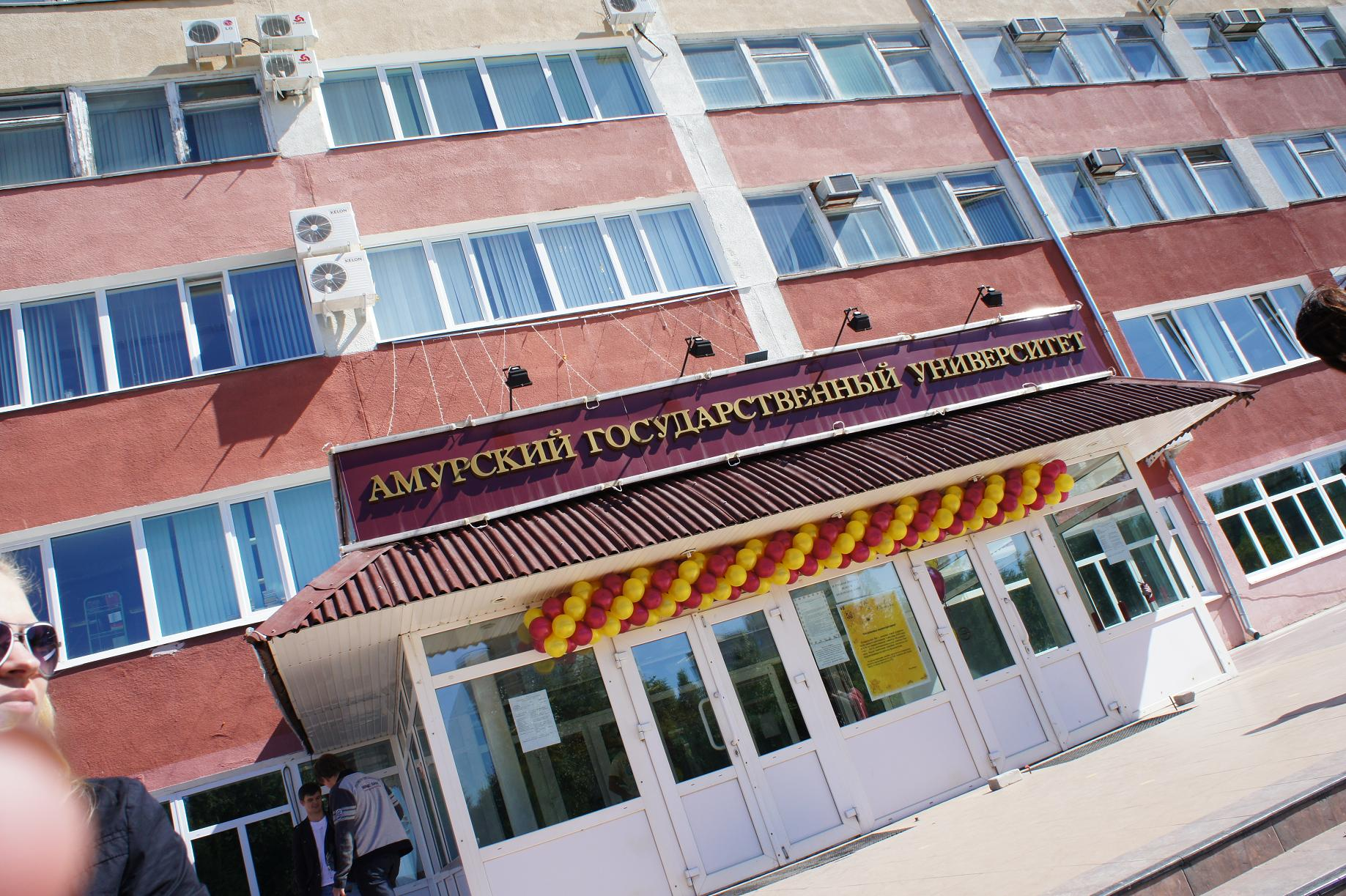

Amur State University (Russian: Аму́рский госуда́рственный университе́т) is a university in Blagoveshchensk, Amur Oblast, Russia. Blagoveshchensk Technological Institute was founded on the basis of Blagoveshchensk Technical Faculty in 1975. In 1992 Blagoveshchensk Technological Institute was renamed into Blagoveshchensk Polytechnical Institute. Two years later the Polytechnical Institute developed into a full-fledged multidisciplinary university; the Amur State University.

== Faculties ==
- Mathematics and Computer Science
- Physical engineering
- International Relations
- Design and technology
- Social Sciences
- Philology
- Economy
- Energy
- Law
- Pre-university courses
- Professional development and professional retraining
- STR
- General Lyceum (grades 5–11)
