= Gródek Castle =

Coordinates: 49.1667°N 26.5667°E

Horodok Castle, also known as Gródek Castle (Ukrainian: Городоцький замок, Polish: Zamek w Gródku) was a fortress situated by the river Smotrych.

== Description ==
Gródek Castle is a ruined fortification in the western Ukrainian town of Horodok.

== History ==
The king of Poland, Sigismund I the Old, wrote a letter to his brothers - Mikołaj Herbut and Jan Swiercz giving them a privilege to collect customs. The castle had to be firmly reinforced, because the King named it as fortress.

In 1653 the castle was taken over by the Khmelnytsky's Cossacks. They had no mercy for the gentry nor the burgesses. Anyway, their plunders stopped the horde which decided to rebel against Khmelnytsky and leave Podolia. It is speculated that their decision prevented Khmelnytsky from creating a Ukrainian nation-state.

The castle is almost completely ruined, with only a small part of the wall surviving.

== Manor house ==
In the 19th century ruins of the old castle were rebuilt by the Russian general - baron Geismar who changed the castle into a comfortable, double-decker, classicistic manor house that existed until the Interwar period.
