= Sixty-Four Villages East of the River =

Territory ceded by the People's Republic of China to Russia

Coordinates: 50°06′N 127°41′E

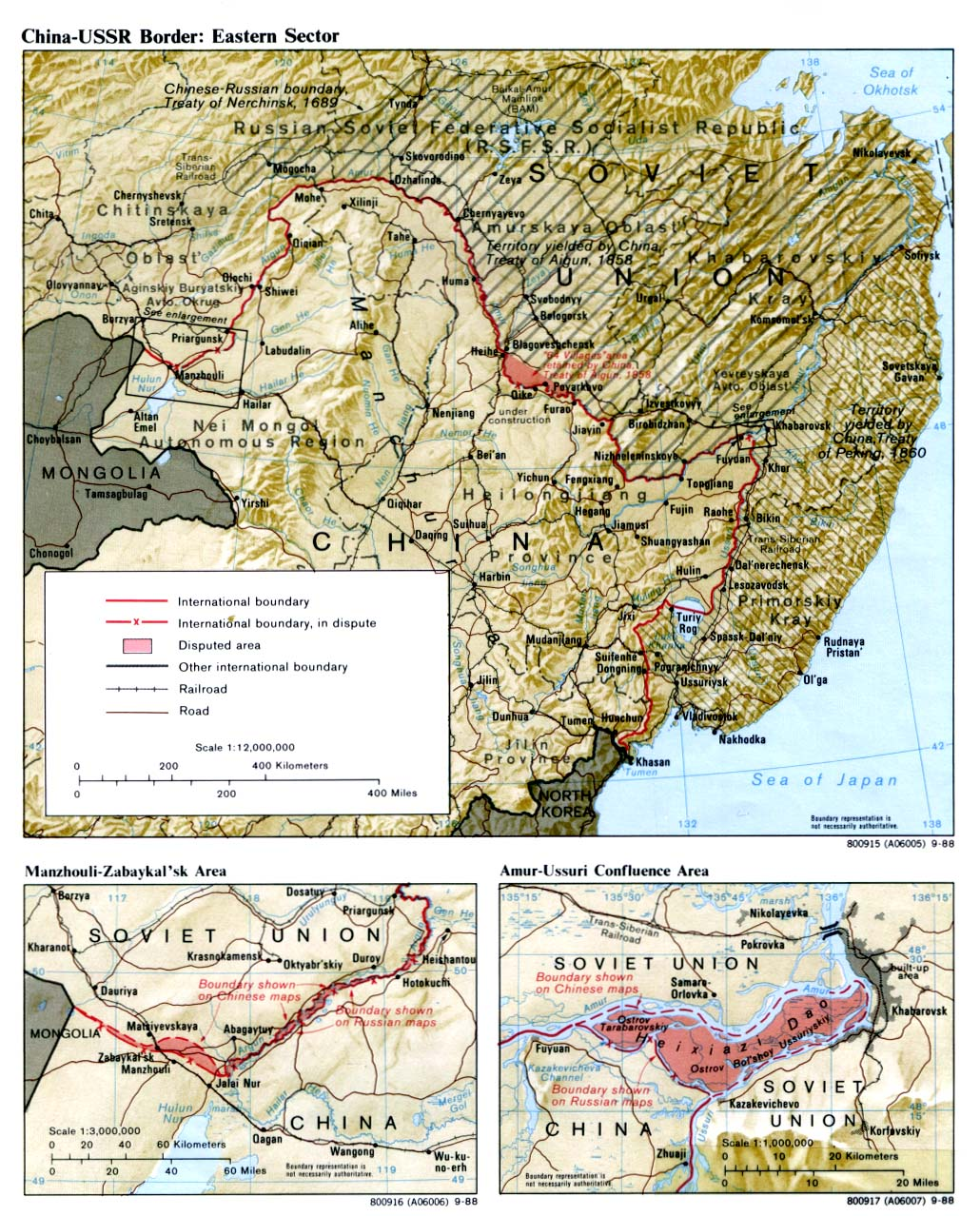
- The Sixty-Four Villages East of the River are opposite of Heihe, China and Blagoveshchensk, Russia, in the red area next to the rightward shaded area on the map.

Chinese name
- Simplified Chinese: 江东六十四屯
- Traditional Chinese: 江東六十四屯
Transcriptions
Standard Mandarin
- Hanyu Pinyin: Jiāngdōng Liùshísì Tún

Russian name
- Russian: Шестьдесят четыре деревни к востоку от реки Амур or Зазейский район

The Sixty-Four Villages East of the River were a group of Manchu, Daur and Han-inhabited villages located on the left (north) bank of the Amur River (Heilong Jiang) opposite of Heihe, and on the east bank of Zeya River opposite of Blagoveshchensk. The area totaled 3,600 square kilometers (1,400 mi^{2}).

Among Russian historians, the district occupied by the villages is sometimes referred as Zazeysky rayon (the "Trans-Zeya District" or "The district beyond the Zeya"), because it was separated by the Zeya from the regional capital, Blagoveshchensk.

== History ==
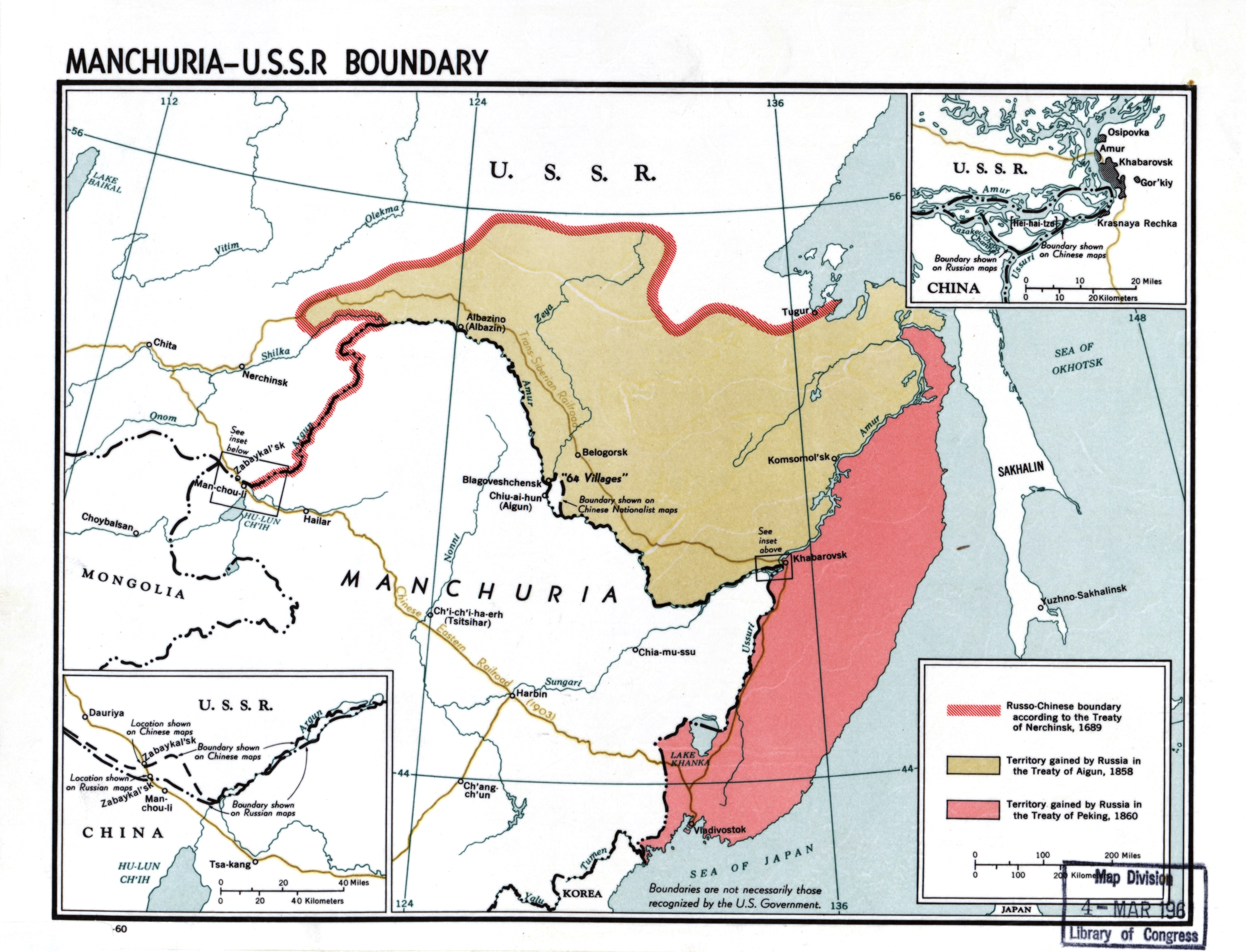
Map of the region including the "64 Villages" boundary shown on Chinese Nationalist maps

In the summer of 1857, the Russian Empire offered monetary compensation to China's Qing dynasty government if they would remove the native inhabitants from the area; however, their offer was rebuffed. The following year, in the 1858 Treaty of Aigun, the Qing ceded the north bank of the Amur to Russia. However, Qing subjects residing north of the Amur River were permitted to "retain their domiciles in perpetuity under the authority of the Manchu government".

The earliest known Russian estimate (1859) gives the population of Qing subjects in the "Trans-Zeya District" as 3,000, without breakdown by ethnicity; the next one (1870) gives it as 10,646, including 5,400 Han, 4,500 Manchus and 1,000 Daurs. The estimates published between the late 1870s and early 1890s varied between 12,000 and 16,000, peaking in 1894, at 16,102 (including 9,119 Han Chinese, 5,783 Manchus, and 1,200 Daurs). After that, reported numbers went down (7,000 to 7,500 residents reported each year from 1895 to 1899); by that time, however, the Trans-Zeya villagers constituted only a minority of the Chinese present in the region. For example, besides the Trans-Zeya villagers, in 1898 statistics reported 12,199 Chinese otkhodniki (migrant workers) and 5,400 Chinese miners in the Amur Oblast as it existed at the time, as well as 4,008 Chinese urban residents in Blagoveshchensk and probably elsewhere.

During the Boxer Rebellion in 1900, Qing forces attempted to blockade Russian boat traffic on the Amur near Aigun, starting from 16 July, and attacked Blagoveshchensk along with Chinese Honghuzi bandits. In response to these attacks the military governor of the Amur region, Lieutenant-General Konstantin Nikolaevich Gribskii, ordered the expulsion of all Qing subjects who remained north of the river. This included the residents of the villages, and Chinese traders and workers who lived in Blagoveshchensk proper, where they numbered anywhere between half to one-sixth of the local population of 30,000. They were taken by the local police and driven into the river to be drowned. Those who could swim were shot by the Russian forces. Thousands died as a result.

The massacre angered the Chinese, and had ramifications for the future: the Chinese Honghuzi fought a guerrilla war against Russian occupation and assisted the Japanese in the Russo-Japanese War against the Russians in revenge. Louis Livingston Seaman mentioned the massacre as being the reason for the Chinese Honghuzi hatred towards the Russians: "The Chinaman, be he Hung-hutze or peasant, in his relation to the Russians in this conflict with Japan has not forgotten the terrible treatment accorded him since the Muscovite occupation of Manchuria. He still remembers the massacre at Blagovestchensk when nearly 8,000 unarmed men, women, and children were driven at the point of the bayonet into the raging Amur, until—as one of the Russian officers who participated in that brutal murder told me at Chin-Wang-Tao in 1900 — "the execution of my orders made me almost sick, for it seemed as though I could have walked across the river on the bodies of the floating dead." Not a Chinaman escaped, except forty who were employed by a leading foreign merchant who ransomed their lives at a thousand rubles each. These, and many even worse, atrocities are remembered and now is their moment for revenge. So it was easy for Japan to enlist the sympathy of these men, especially when emphasized by liberal pay, as is now the case. It is believed that more than 10,000 of these bandits, divided into companies of from 200 to 300 each and led by Japanese officers, are now in the pay of Japan."

== Ongoing dispute ==
The Republic of China (ROC) has never recognized the Russian occupation as legitimate. In the 1991 Sino-Soviet Border Agreement, the People's Republic of China (PRC) renounced sovereignty of the 64 Villages. However, the Republic of China now based in Taiwan never renounced sovereignty of the area nor does it recognize any border agreements signed by the People's Republic of China with any other countries due to the restrictions imposed by Article 4 of the Constitution of the Republic of China and Section 5 of Article 4 of the Additional Articles of the Constitution of the Republic of China. Therefore, the area still appears as Chinese territory in many maps of China published in Taiwan even though it is now administered as a part of Amur Oblast, Russia.

== See also ==
- 1900 Amur anti-Chinese pogroms
- Outer Manchuria
