= Blagoveshchensk =

City in Amur Oblast, Russia

Blagoveshchensk Благовещенск
- City
- Lenin Square The Blagoveschensk State Pedagogical University The House of Russia - China Friendship The Blagoveschensk Triumphal Arch

- Flag Coat of arms
- Anthem: Anthem of Blagoveshchensk
- Interactive map of Blagoveshchensk
- Location of Blagoveshchensk Blagoveshchensk (Amur Oblast)
- Coordinates: 50°15′N 127°32′E
- Country: Russia
- Federal subject: Amur Oblast
- Founded: 1856

Government
  - Body
  - Mayor: Oleg Imameyev

Area
  - Total: 320.97 km^{2} (123.93 sq mi)
- Elevation: 122 m (400 ft)

Population (2010 Census)
  - Total: 214,390
  - Estimate (2025): 225,453 (+5.2%)
  - Rank: 87th in 2010
  - Density: 667.94/km^{2} (1,730.0/sq mi)

Administrative status
  - Subordinated to: Blagoveshchensk Urban Okrug
  - Capital of: Amur Oblast, Blagoveshchensk Urban Okrug

Municipal status
  - Urban okrug: Blagoveshchensk Urban Okrug
  - Capital of: Blagoveshchensk Urban Okrug, Blagoveshchensky Municipal District
- Time zone: UTC+9 (MSK+6)
- Postal codes: 675000–675007, 675009–675011, 675014, 675016, 675018–675021, 671025, 671027–671030, 671700, 671801, 671890, 671960–671962, 671971, 671980–671983, 671985
- Dialing code: +7 4162
- OKTMO ID: 10701000001
- City Day: June 2 (observed on the first Saturday of June)
- Website: www.admblag.ru

Blagoveshchensk (Russian: Благовещенск, IPA: [bləɡɐˈvʲeɕːɪnsk], lit. 'City of the Annunciation') is a city and the administrative center of Amur Oblast, Russia. It is located at the confluence of the Amur and the Zeya Rivers, opposite the Chinese city of Heihe.

Historical population
| Year | Pop. | ±% |
|---|---|---|
| 1897 | 32,834 | — |
| 1926 | 61,205 | +86.4% |
| 1939 | 58,790 | −3.9% |
| 1959 | 94,746 | +61.2% |
| 1970 | 127,757 | +34.8% |
| 1979 | 171,997 | +34.6% |
| 1989 | 205,553 | +19.5% |
| 2002 | 219,221 | +6.6% |
| 2010 | 214,390 | −2.2% |
| 2021 | 241,437 | +12.6% |
Source: Census data

The Amur has formed Russia's border with China since the 1858 Treaty of Aigun and the 1860 Convention of Peking. The area north of the Amur belonged to the Manchu Qing dynasty by the Treaty of Nerchinsk of 1689 until it was ceded to Russia by the Treaty of Aigun in 1858.

== History ==
=== Early history of the region ===
The early residents of both sides of the Amur in the region of today's Blagoveshchensk were the Daurs and Duchers. An early settlement in the area of today's Blagoveshchensk was the Ducher town whose name was reported by the Russian explorer Yerofey Khabarov as Aytyun in 1652, as Aigun from 1683 to 1685, and as Aigun Old Town from 1685 until the massacre in 1900, which is known to Russian archaeologists as the Grodekovo site, after the nearby village of Grodekovo about 25–30 km (16–19 mi) southeast of Blagoveshchensk. The Grodekovo site is thought by archaeologists to have been populated since ca. AD 1000.

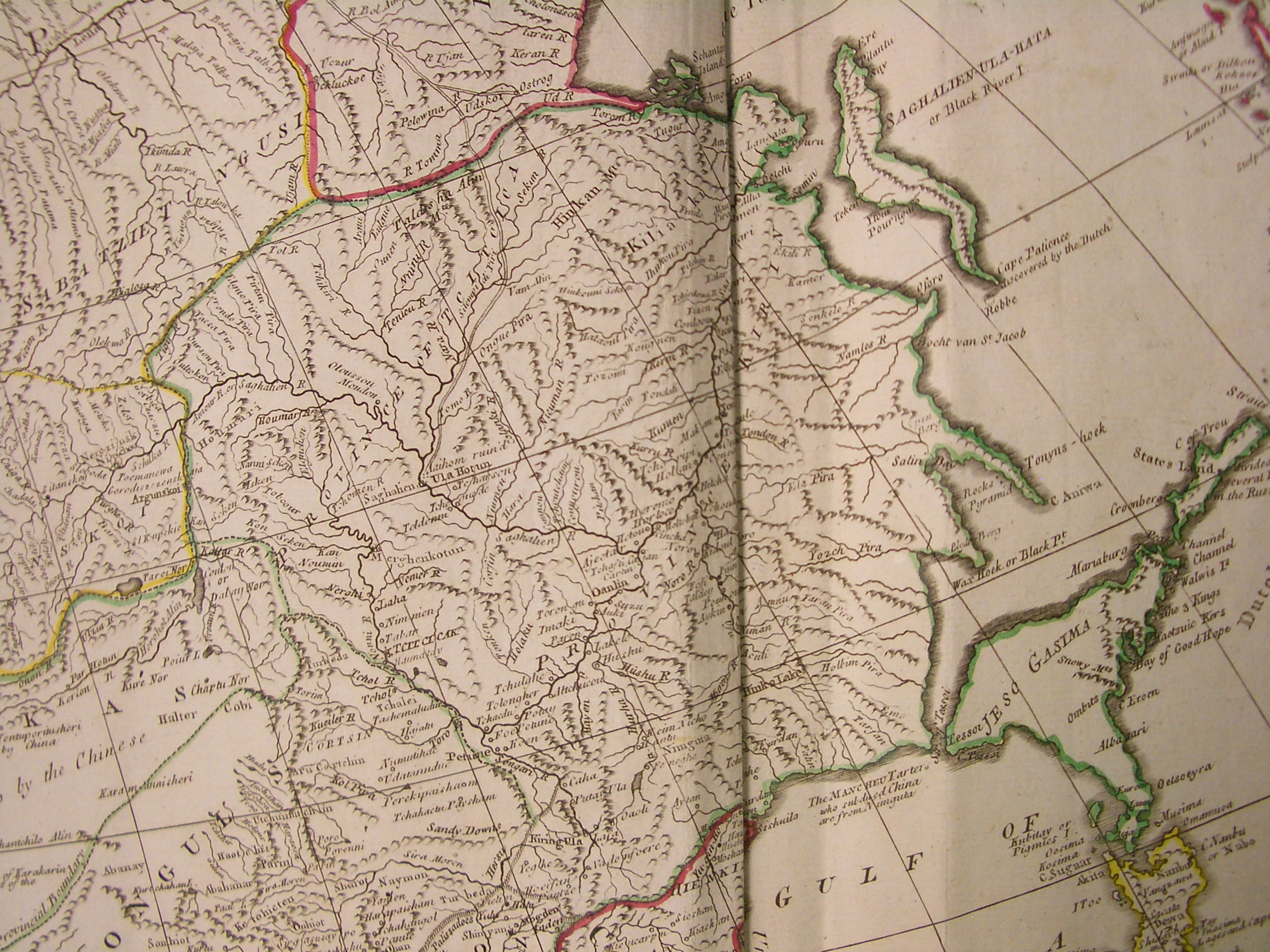
Aaihom ruin'd (i.e., Old Aigun), in the Province of Tcitcica on this 18th-century map corresponds to the Grodekovo site; Saghalien Ula Hoton, across the river, is Aigun. There is nothing much near the site of Blagoveshchensk itself (Note: at the confluence of the Saghalien (Amur) River and the Tchikiri (Zeya) River)

As the Russians tried to assert their control over the region, the Ducher town was probably vacated when the Duchers were evacuated by the Qing to the Sungari or Hurka in the mid-1650s. Since 1673, the Chinese reused the site for their fort ("Old Aigun", in modern literature), which served from 1683 to 1685 as a base for the Manchus' campaign against the Russian fort of Albazin further north.

After the capture of Albazin in 1685 or 1686, the Chinese relocated their town, to a new site on the right (southwestern, i.e. presently Chinese) bank of the Amur, about 3 miles (4.8 km) downstream from the original site; it later became known as Aigun. (Note: Note that the distance between modern Grodekovo and the historic Aigun on the Chinese side of the river is about 15 kilometers (9.3 mi) on modern maps, rather than 3 miles (4.8 km), as Ravenstein states. However, the location of the Grodekovo archaeological site (i.e., the "Old Aigun") may be quite a distance from the eponymous village; and Ravenstein may be somewhat imprecise in the number.)

The series of conflicts between Russians and China ended with Russia's recognition of the Chinese sovereignty over both sides of the Amur by the Nerchinsk Treaty of 1689.

=== Russian settlement ===
As the balance of power in the region had changed by the mid-19th century, the Russian Empire was able to take over the left (generally northern, but around Blagoveshchensk, eastern) bank of the Amur from China. Since the 1858 Treaty of Aigun and the 1860 Convention of Peking, the river has remained the border between the countries, although the Qing subjects were allowed to continue to live in the so-called Sixty-Four Villages east of the Amur and the Zeya (i.e., within today's Blagoveshchensk's eastern suburbs).

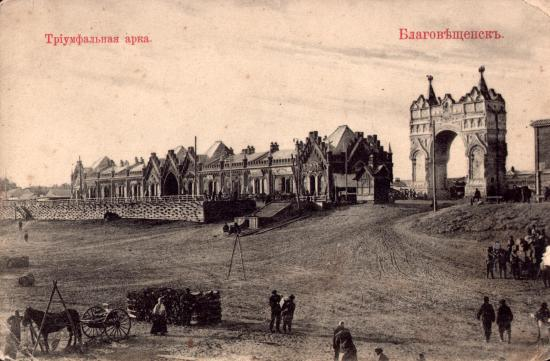
The triumphal arch erected in Blagoveshchensk to welcome Crown Prince Nicholas in 1891

Although Russian settlers had lived in the area as early as 1644 and was known as Hailanpao (Chinese: 海兰泡; simplified Chinese: 海兰泡; traditional Chinese: 海蘭泡; pinyin: Hǎilánpāo), the present-day city began in 1856 as the military outpost of Ust-Zeysky; this name means settlement at the mouth of the Zeya River in Russian. Tsar Alexander II gave approval for the founding of the city in 1858 as the seat of government for the Amur region, to be named Blagoveshchensk (literally "the city of good news") after the parish church which was dedicated to the Annunciation. According to Blagoveshchensk authorities, by 1877 the city had some 8,000 residents, with merely 15 foreigners (presumably, Chinese) among them.

The city was an important river port and trade centre during the late 19th century, with growth further fuelled by a gold rush early in the 20th century and by its position on the Chinese border opposite the city of Heihe.

Local historians noted the pre-eminence of Blagoveshchensk in the economy of the late 19th century Russian Far East, which was reflected when the heir to the Russian throne, Nicholas Alexandrovich, (Note: the future Tsar Nicholas II) visited in 1891 during his grand tour of Asiatic Russia, and the locals presented him with bread and salt on a gold tray, rather than on a silver one as in other cities of the region.

=== Boxer Rebellion ===
In the course of the Boxer Rebellion, the Qing Imperial army (made out of Manchus and Han Chinese) and Boxer insurgents shelled the city in July 1900. Chinese Honghuzi forces joined the attack against Blagoveshchensk. According to the Orthodox belief, the city was allegedly saved by a miraculous icon of Our Lady of Albazin, which was prayed to continuously during the shelling which lasted almost two weeks.

On 3 July (Old Style), a decision was made by the city's Police Chief Batarevich and the Military Governor Gribsky to deport the city's entire community of Qing subjects including ethnic Manchus, Daur people and Han, numbering 4,008), who were viewed as potential fifth columnists. As cross-river shipping was interrupted by the rebellion, the question arose how to get them from the Russian to the Chinese side of the Amur. Batarevich suggested that the deportees could be first taken east of the Zeya, where they should obtain boats from the local Chinese villagers. The plan, however, was vetoed by the governor, and the decision was made instead to take the deportees to the stanitsa of Verkhneblagoveshchenskaya—the place where the Amur is at its narrowest—and make them leave Russia there. As the local ataman refused to provide boats to take them across the river (despite the orders of his superior), few of them made it to the Chinese side. The rest drowned in the Amur, or were shot or axed by the police, Cossacks and local volunteers, if they refused to leave the bank. Local Chinese memory holds that a massacre that took place then, at the hands of the Cossacks, which killed so many that the Amur River was choked. According to Chinese sources, about 5,000 people reportedly died during these events of 4–8 July 1900.

There were 1,266 households in the city, including 900 Daurs and 4,500 Manchus until the massacre. Many Manchu villages were burned by Cossacks in the massacre according to Victor Zatsepine.

This expulsion of the local Chinese caused some hardships for Blagoveshchensk consumers. For example, during the second half of 1900 it became almost impossible to buy any green vegetables in the town, and ten eggs would cost 30 to 50 kopecks (and in winter, as much as a rouble), while previously it had been possible to buy ten eggs for 10 to 15 kopecks.

The massacre angered the Chinese and had ramifications for the future: the Chinese Honghuzi fought a guerilla war against Russian occupation and assisted the Japanese in the Russo-Japanese War against the Russians in revenge. Louis Livingston Seaman mentioned the massacre as being the reason for the Chinese Honghuzi hatred towards the Russians:

The Chinaman, be he Hung-hutze or peasant, in his relation to the Russians in this conflict with Japan has not forgotten the terrible treatment accorded him since the Muscovite occupation of Manchuria. He still remembers the massacre at Blagoveshchensk when nearly 8,000 unarmed men, women, and children were driven at the point of the bayonet into the raging Amur, until — as one of the Russian officers who participated in that brutal murder told me at Chin-Wang-Tao in 1900 — "the execution of my orders made me almost sick, for it seemed as though I could have walked across the river on the bodies of the floating dead." Not a Chinaman escaped, except forty who were employed by a leading foreign merchant who ransomed their lives at a thousand roubles each. These, and many even worse, atrocities are remembered and now is their moment for revenge. So, it was easy for Japan to enlist the sympathy of these men, especially when emphasized by liberal pay, as is now the case. It is believed that more than 10,000 of these bandits, divided into companies of from 200 to 300 each and led by Japanese officers, are now in the pay of Japan.

=== Civil war and the Soviet era ===
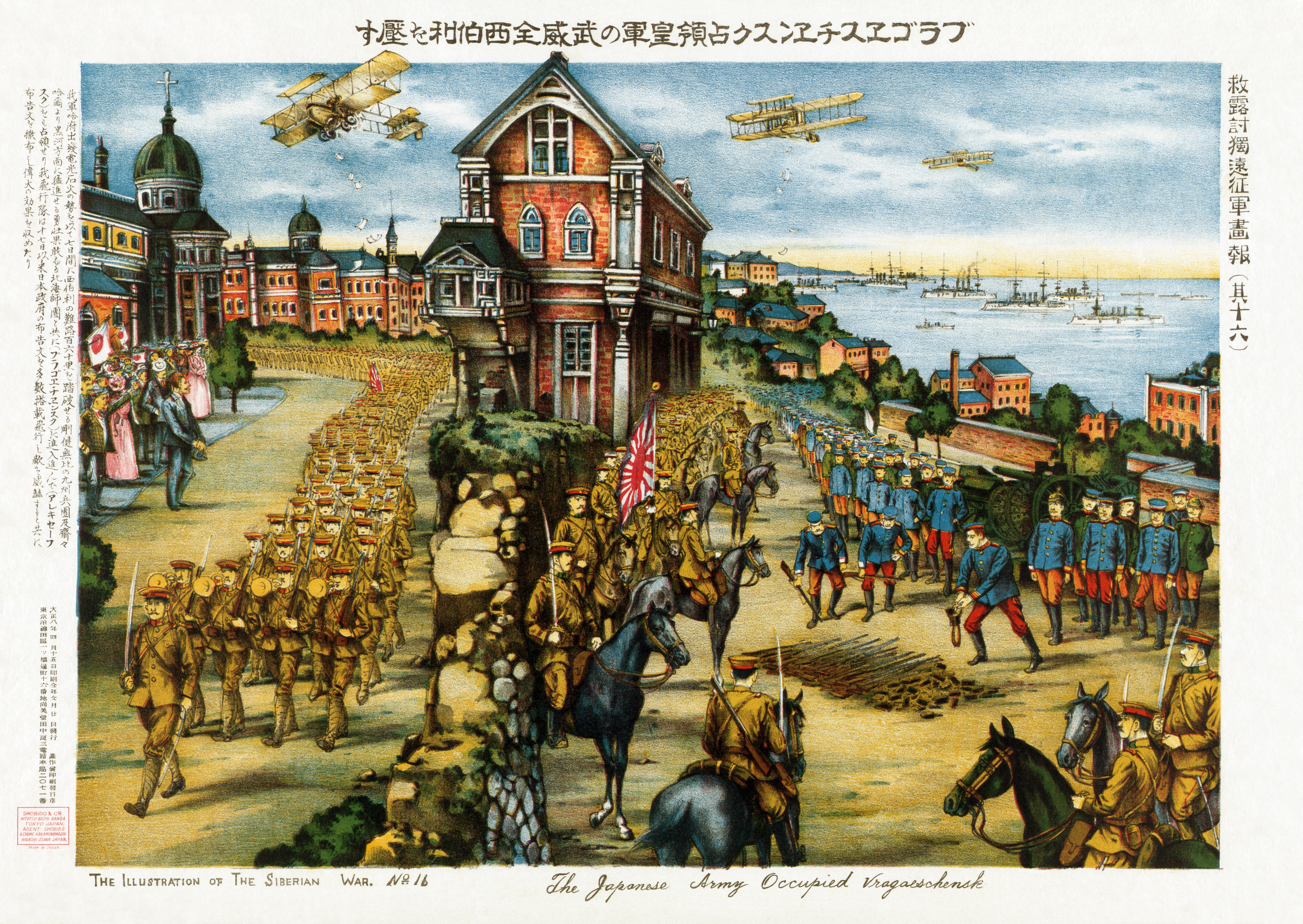
A Japanese poster depicting the Japanese occupation of Blagoveshchensk in 1919–1922

The city was also the site of conflict during the Russian Civil War, with Japanese troops occupying the city in support of the White Army. From 1920 until 1922, the city was declared part of the Far Eastern Republic, an area which was nominally independent, but in reality, a buffer zone under control of the Russian SFSR. The city became the administrative centre of Amur Oblast in 1932.

During the Cultural Revolution in China, the city was subject to Maoist propaganda blasted from loudspeakers across the river 24 hours a day.

== Administrative and municipal status ==
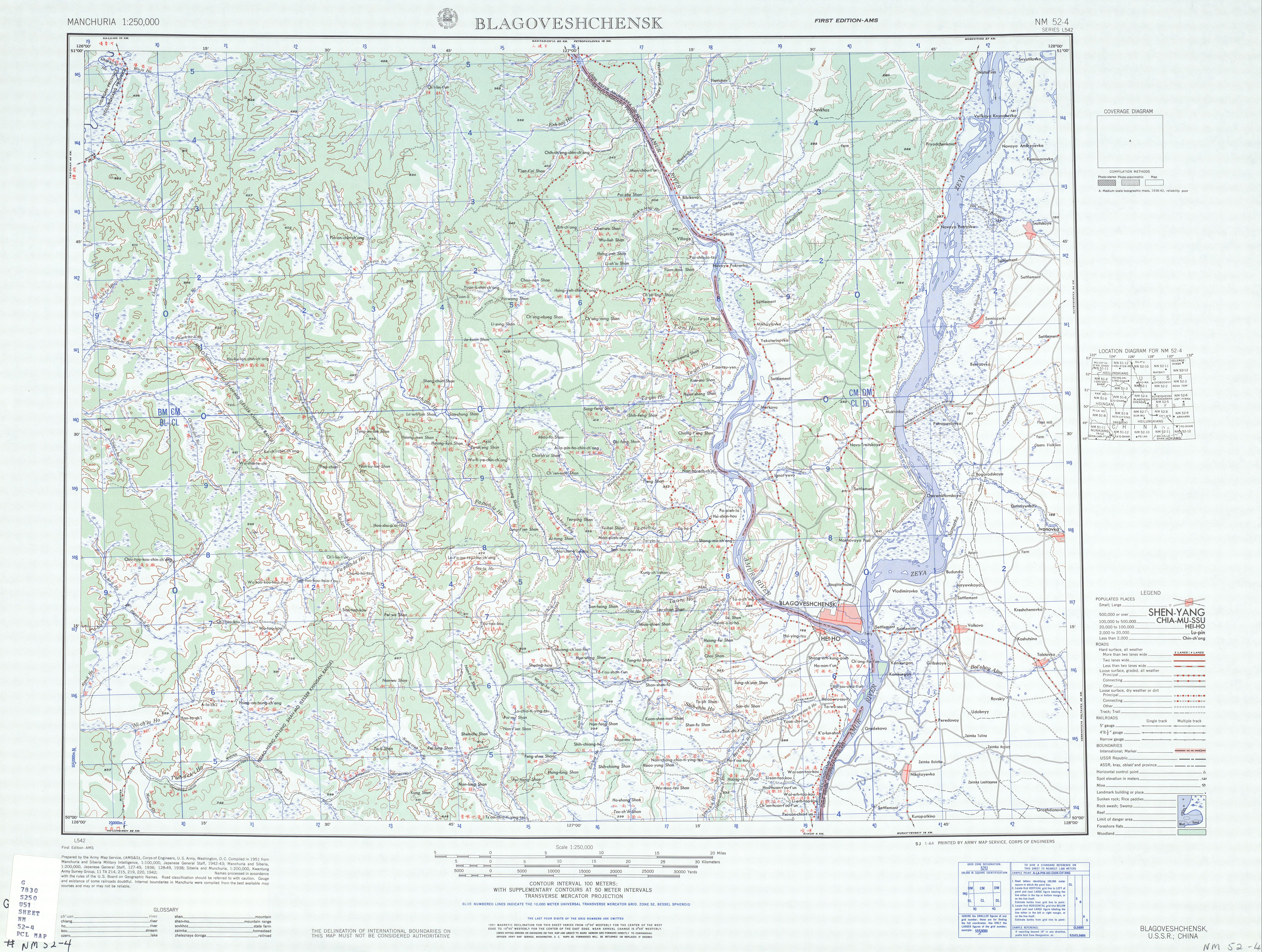
Blagoveshchensk (1951)

Blagoveshchensk is the administrative centre of the oblast and, within the framework of administrative divisions, it also serves as the administrative centre of Blagoveshchensky District, even though it is not a part of it. As an administrative division, it is, together with six rural localities, incorporated separately as Blagoveshchensk Urban Okrug—an administrative unit with status equal to that of the districts. As a municipal division, this administrative unit also has urban okrug status.

== Politics ==
In July 2013, a public hearing was held at which citizens declared themselves to be in favour of a return to the direct election of the mayor. A meeting of deputies voted for rejection of the "two-headed" management. In September 2013, City Council voted for a return to the mayoral election of the mayor

== Geography ==
The city is located at the confluence of the Amur and the Zeya Rivers, opposite the Chinese city of Heihe.

=== Climate ===
Blagoveschensk experiences a monsoon-influenced hot-summer humid continental climate (Köppen Dwa, Trewartha Dcac), bordering on a monsoon-influenced warm-summer humid continental climate (Dwb, Dcbc) which it had before 1990. The climate is very strongly continental. The city features frigid, windy, but dry winters due to the influence of the Siberian high, and warm, wet summers, due to the East Asian monsoon. On the evening of 31 July 2011, it became the first city in the Russian Far East to be hit by a tornado. Temperatures have never risen above freezing from 21 December to 26 January inclusive; conversely, there has never been a freeze between 23 May and 12 September Blagoveshchensk has perhaps the coldest winters of any city with a "hot-summer" humid continental climate subtype (Dfa).

Climate data for Blagoveshchensk (1991–2020, extremes 1859–present)
| Month | Jan | Feb | Mar | Apr | May | Jun | Jul | Aug | Sep | Oct | Nov | Dec | Year |
|---|---|---|---|---|---|---|---|---|---|---|---|---|---|
| Record high °C (°F) | 0.2 (32.4) | 7.0 (44.6) | 20.3 (68.5) | 31.4 (88.5) | 34.7 (94.5) | 39.4 (102.9) | 37.7 (99.9) | 36.9 (98.4) | 33.5 (92.3) | 28.0 (82.4) | 13.4 (56.1) | 3.6 (38.5) | 39.4 (102.9) |
| Mean daily maximum °C (°F) | −15.1 (4.8) | −9.4 (15.1) | −0.2 (31.6) | 11.2 (52.2) | 19.9 (67.8) | 25.5 (77.9) | 27.7 (81.9) | 25.4 (77.7) | 19.4 (66.9) | 9.3 (48.7) | −4.6 (23.7) | −14.7 (5.5) | 7.9 (46.2) |
| Daily mean °C (°F) | −21.0 (−5.8) | −16.1 (3.0) | −6.4 (20.5) | 4.9 (40.8) | 13.2 (55.8) | 19.4 (66.9) | 22.2 (72.0) | 19.9 (67.8) | 13.0 (55.4) | 3.5 (38.3) | −9.8 (14.4) | −19.8 (−3.6) | 1.9 (35.4) |
| Mean daily minimum °C (°F) | −25.6 (−14.1) | −21.8 (−7.2) | −12.2 (10.0) | −1.1 (30.0) | 6.9 (44.4) | 13.8 (56.8) | 17.5 (63.5) | 15.4 (59.7) | 7.9 (46.2) | −1.1 (30.0) | −13.9 (7.0) | −23.9 (−11.0) | −3.2 (26.2) |
| Record low °C (°F) | −44.5 (−48.1) | −45.4 (−49.7) | −35.7 (−32.3) | −17.7 (0.1) | −7.5 (18.5) | 0.1 (32.2) | 8.2 (46.8) | 4.4 (39.9) | −4.3 (24.3) | −24.8 (−12.6) | −32.9 (−27.2) | −41.2 (−42.2) | −45.4 (−49.7) |
| Average precipitation mm (inches) | 7 (0.3) | 7 (0.3) | 10 (0.4) | 25 (1.0) | 55 (2.2) | 91 (3.6) | 141 (5.6) | 112 (4.4) | 68 (2.7) | 30 (1.2) | 13 (0.5) | 11 (0.4) | 570 (22.4) |
| Average extreme snow depth cm (inches) | 12 (4.7) | 10 (3.9) | 3 (1.2) | 0 (0) | 0 (0) | 0 (0) | 0 (0) | 0 (0) | 0 (0) | 1 (0.4) | 4 (1.6) | 8 (3.1) | 12 (4.7) |
| Average rainy days | 0 | 0 | 0.4 | 9 | 15 | 17 | 18 | 17 | 16 | 8 | 0.4 | 0 | 101 |
| Average snowy days | 12 | 7 | 8 | 6 | 1 | 0 | 0 | 0 | 0.2 | 5 | 12 | 14 | 65 |
| Average relative humidity (%) | 73 | 68 | 62 | 55 | 55 | 70 | 78 | 80 | 72 | 62 | 67 | 74 | 68 |
| Mean monthly sunshine hours | 138 | 194 | 227 | 222 | 252 | 255 | 226 | 227 | 168 | 190 | 157 | 123 | 2,379 |
Source 1: Погода и Климат
Source 2: NOAA (sun, 1961–1990)

== Economy ==
Since the dissolution of the Soviet Union, the city's economic focus has turned to border trade with China. The town is now home to a large Chinese expatriate community. Blagoveshchensk is part of a free-trade zone which includes the Chinese city of Heihe, located on the other side of the Amur River.

Main industries in the town include metal and timber processing, as well as paper production.

=== Transportation ===
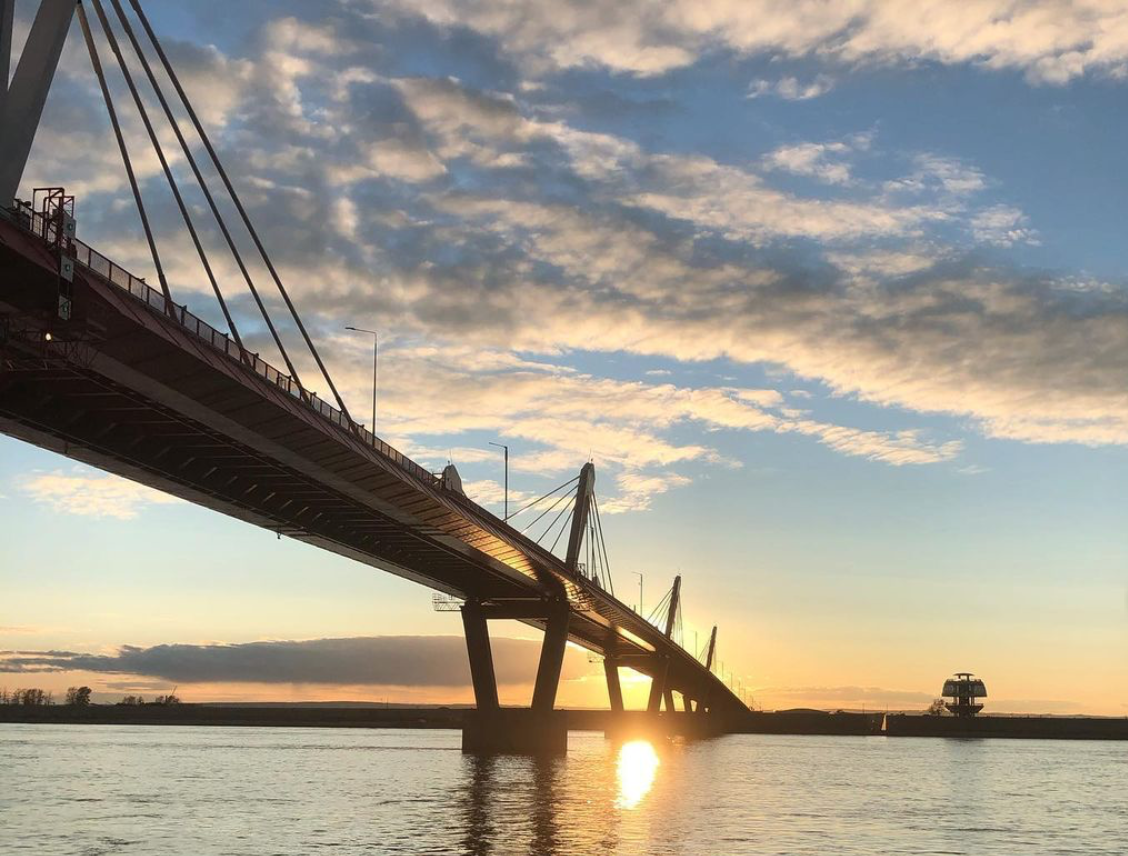
Blagoveshchensk–Heihe Bridge

The city is served by a branch highway and railway connecting it to Belogorsk on the Trans-Siberian Railway and Trans-Siberian Highway. It is also served by a river port. On the other side of the Amur River is Heihe, Heilongjiang Province, China, which is the starting point of China National Highway 202 that goes south to Harbin and Dalian. Ignatyevo Airport, located 20 kilometers (12 mi) northwest of the city center, serves domestic destinations.

The Blagoveshchensk–Heihe Bridge, completed at the end of 2019, includes a 2-lane highway bridge over the Amur to link Blagoveshchensk and Heihe.

The world's first international cable car to Heihe was previously proposed in 2019, with plans that it could have opened in 2022.

== Education ==
=== Universities ===
- Amur State Medical Academy
- Amur State University
- Blagoveshchensk State Pedagogical University
- Far Eastern Higher Combined Arms Command School
- Far Eastern State Agricultural University
- Finance University under the Government of the Russian Federation (Blagoveschensk Branch)
- Maritime State University named after admiral Gennady Nevelskoy (Blagoveschensk Branch)
- Modern University for the Humanities (Blagoveschensk Branch)
- Moscow Academy of Business in Association with the Government of Moscow (Blagoveschensk Branch)

== Sister city ==
- Heihe, Heilongjiang, China

== See also ==
- Nikolay Muravyov-Amursky
- Amur Cossacks

== Sources ==
- Амурский областной Совет народных депутатов. Закон №127-ОЗ от 23 декабря 2005 г. «О порядке решения вопросов административно-территориального устройства Амурской области», в ред. Закона №272-ОЗ от 11 ноября 2013 г. «О внесении изменений в Закон Амурской области "О порядке решения вопросов административно-территориального устройства Амурской области"». Вступил в силу со дня первого официального опубликования, за исключением подпункта "б" пункта 2 статьи 7, вступающего в силу с 1 января 2006 г. Опубликован: "Амурская правда", №11, 24 января 2006 г. (Amur Oblast Council of People's Deputies. Law #127-OZ of December 23, 2005 On the Procedures of Handling the Issues of the Administrative and Territorial Structure of Amur Oblast, as amended by the Law #272-OZ of November 11, 2013 On Amending the Law of Amur Oblast "On the Procedures of Handling the Issues of the Administrative and Territorial Structure of Amur Oblast". Effective as of the day of the first official publication, with the exception of subitem "b" of item 2 of Article 7, which is effective January 1, 2006.).
- Амурский областной Совет народных депутатов. Закон №447-ОЗ от 14 марта 2005 г «О наделении муниципального образования города Благовещенск статусом городского округа и об установлении его границ», в ред. Закона №175-ОЗ от 26 апреля 2013 г. «О внесении изменений в отдельные законодательные акты Амурской области по вопросам установления границ муниципальных образований». Вступил в силу в соответствии со статьёй 3. Опубликован: "Амурская правда", №61, 25 марта 2005 г. (Amur Oblast Council of People's Deputies. Law #447-OZ of March 14, 2005 On Granting the Municipal Formation of the Town of Blagoveshchensk the Urban Okrug Status and on Establishing Its Borders, as amended by the Law #175-OZ of April 26, 2013 On Amending Various Legislative Acts of Amur Oblast on the Issues of Establishing the Borders of the Municipal Formations. Effective as of the date set forth in accordance with the provisions of Article 3.).
- Амурский областной Совет народных депутатов. Закон №51-ОЗ от 21 сентября 2005 г. «Об установлении границ и наделении соответствующим статусом муниципального образования Благовещенского района и муниципальных образований в его составе», в ред. Закона №175-ОЗ от 26 апреля 2013 г. «О внесении изменений в отдельные законодательные акты Амурской области по вопросам установления границ муниципальных образований». Вступил в силу со дня первого опубликования, за исключением статьи 3, вступившей в силу с 1 января 2006 г. Опубликован: "Амурская правда", №190, 27 сентября 2005 г. (Amur Oblast Council of People's Deputies. Law #51-OZ of September 21, 2005 On Establishing the Borders of and Granting a Corresponding Municipal Formation Status to Blagoveshchensky District and to the Municipal Formations It Comprises, as amended by the Law #175-OZ of April 26, 2013 On Amending Various Legislative Acts of Amur Oblast on the Issues of Establishing the Borders of the Municipal Formations. Effective as of the day of the first publication, with the exception of Article 3 which took effect on January 1, 2006.).
- Дума города Благовещенска. Решение №62/89 от 26 мая 2005 г. «О принятии Устава муниципального образования города Благовещенска», в ред. Решения №11/119 от 28 мая 2015 г. «О внесении изменений в Устав муниципального образования города Благовещенска». Вступил в силу после официального опубликования. Опубликован: "Благовещенск", №38, 23 сентября 2005 г. (Duma of the City of Blagoveshchensk. Decision #62/89 of May 26, 2005 On the Adoption of the Charter of the Municipal Formation of the City of Blagoveshchensk, as amended by the Decision #11/119 of May 28, 2015 On Amending the Charter of the Municipal Formation of the City of Blagoveshchensk. Effective as of after the official publication.).
- Благовещенская городская Дума. Решение №14/60 от 25 мая 2006 г. «О гимне города Благовещенска», в ред. Решения №19/141 от 25 ноября 2010 г. «О внесении изменения в Положение о гимне города Благовещенска, утверждённое решением Благовещенской городской Думы от 25 мая 2006 г. №14/60». Вступил в силу со дня официального опубликования в газете "Благовещенск". Опубликован: "Благовещенск", №22–23, 2 июня 2006 г. (Blagoveshchensk City Duma. Decision #14/60 of May 25, 2006 On the Anthem of the City of Blagoveshchensk, as amended by the Decision #19/141 of November 25, 2010 On Amending the Statute on the Anthem of the City of Blagoveshchensk #14/60 Adopted by the Decision of the Blagoveshchensk City Duma of May 25, 2006. Effective as of the day of the official publication in the Blagoveshchensk newspaper.).
