= Blagoveshchensky District, Amur Oblast =

Blagoveshchensky District Благовещенский район (Russian)
- District
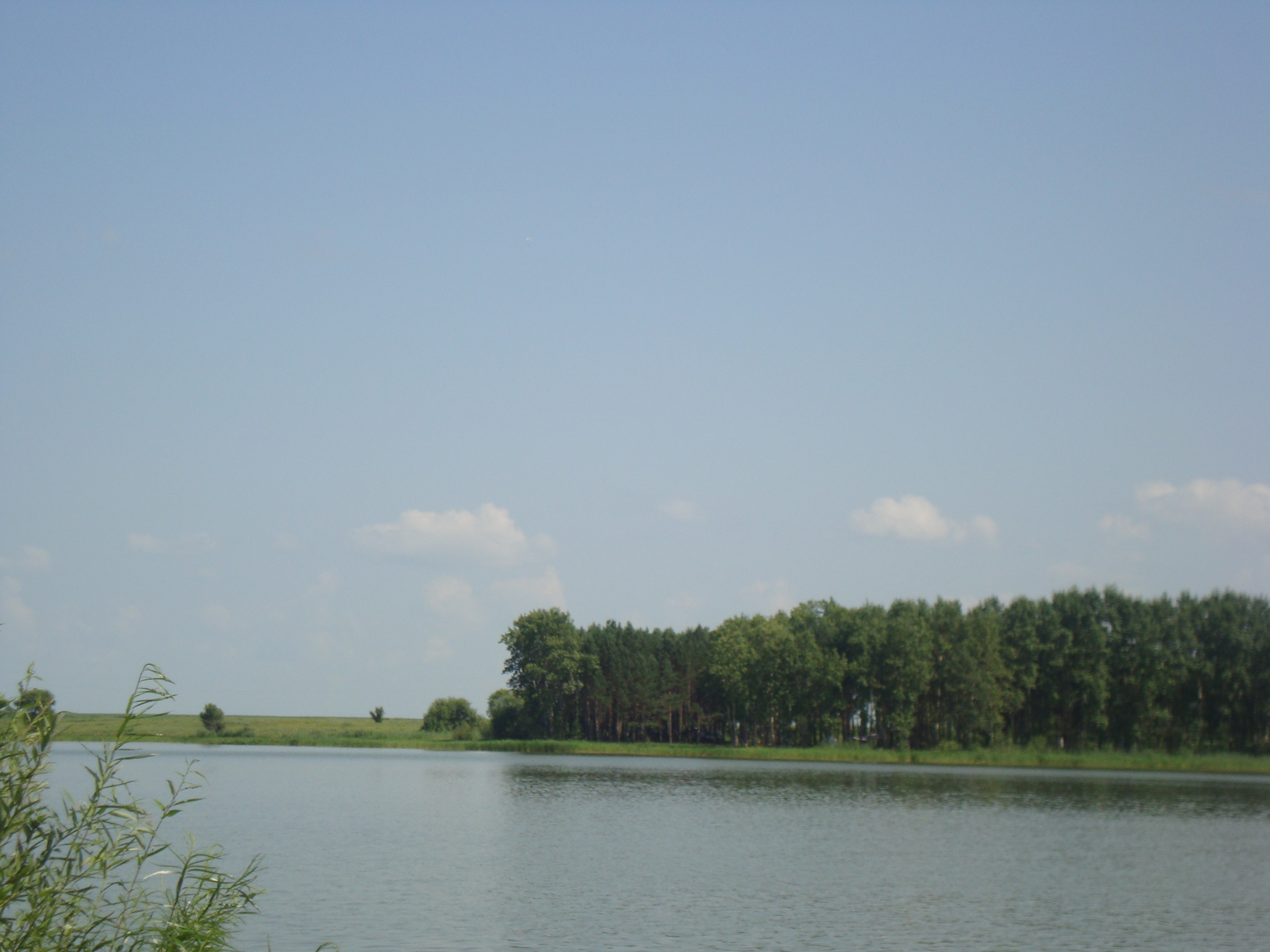
- Gribskov Reservoir

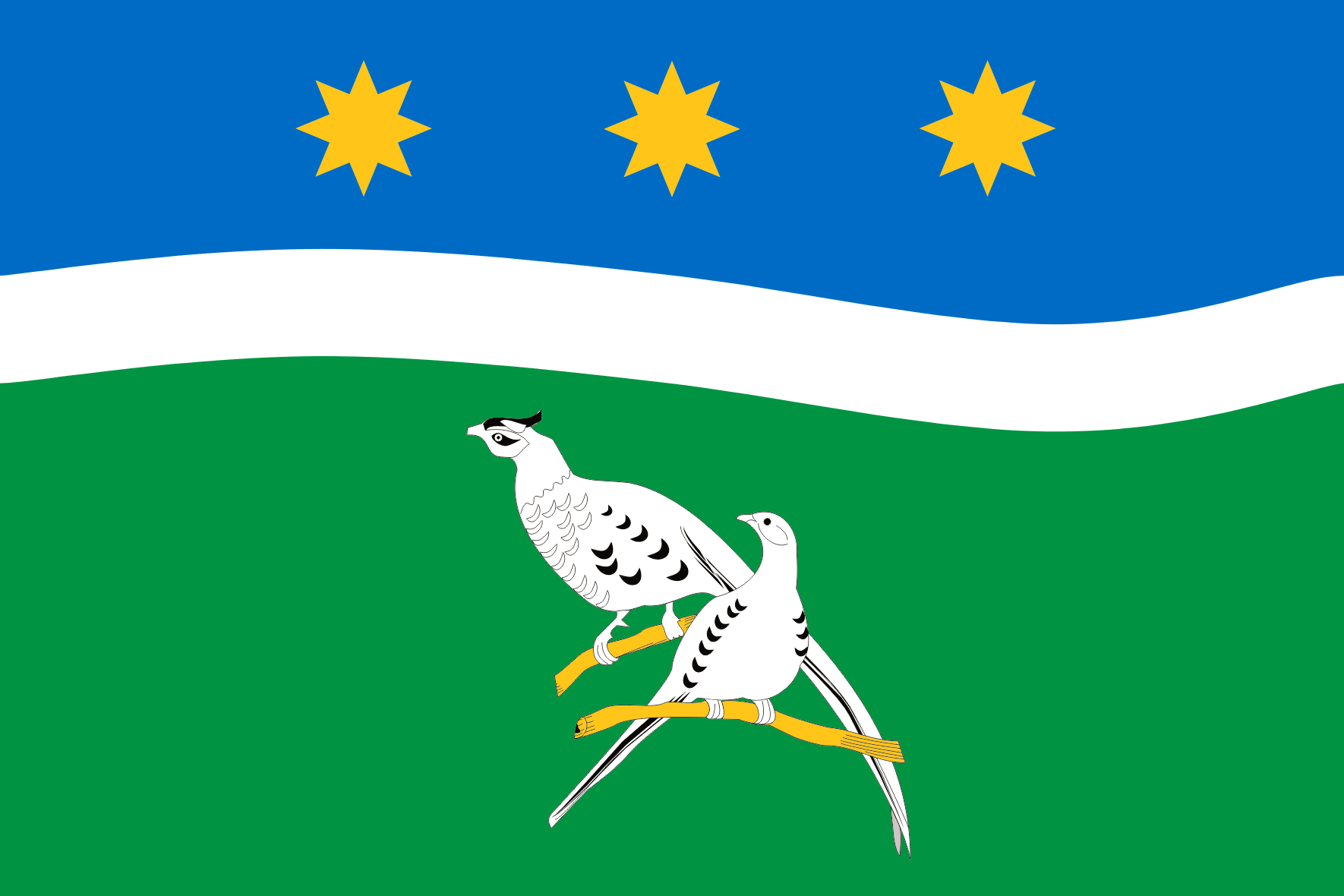
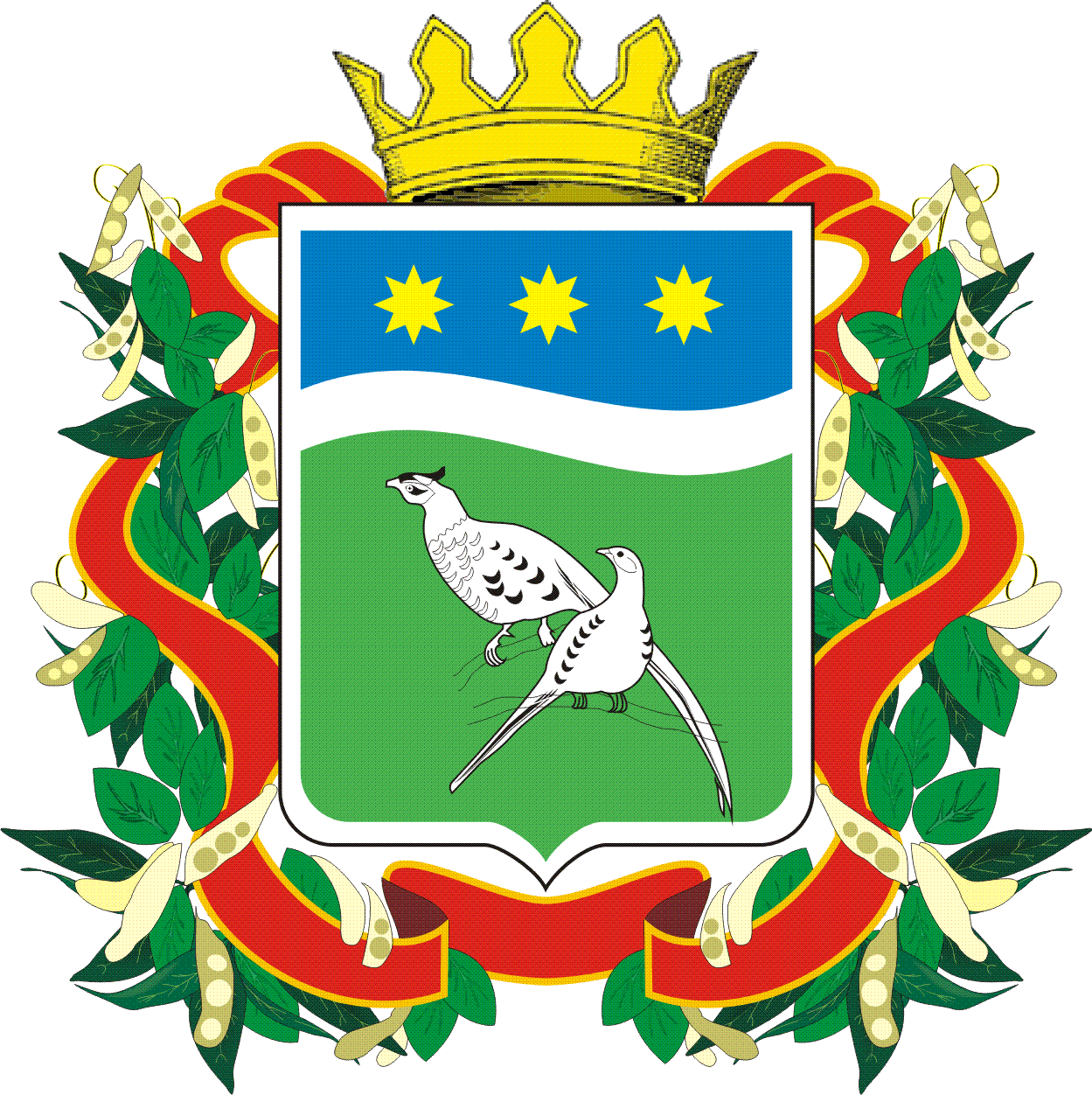
- Flag Coat of arms
- Location of Blagoveshchensky District in Amur Oblast
- Coordinates: 50°19′N 127°31′E
- Country: Russia
- Federal subject: Amur Oblast
- Established: 1937
- Administrative center: Blagoveshchensk

Area
  - Total: 3,060 km^{2} (1,180 sq mi)

Population (2010 Census)
  - Total: 19,641
  - Density: 6.42/km^{2} (16.6/sq mi)
  - Urban: 0%
  - Rural: 100%

Administrative structure
  - Administrative divisions: 11 Rural settlements
  - Inhabited localities: 27 rural localities

Municipal structure
  - Municipally incorporated as: Blagoveshchensky Municipal District
  - Municipal divisions: 0 urban settlements, 11 rural settlements
- Time zone: UTC+9 (MSK+6)
- OKTMO ID: 10611000
- Website: http://www.blagraion.ru/

Blagoveshchensky District (Russian: Благове́щенский райо́н) is an administrative and municipal district (raion), one of the twenty in Amur Oblast, Russia. The area of the district is 3,060 square kilometers (1,180 sq mi). Its administrative center is the city of Blagoveshchensk (which is not administratively a part of the district). Population: 19,641 (2010 census); 18,673 (2002 Census); 18,192 (1989 Soviet census).

== Administrative and municipal status ==
Within the framework of administrative divisions, Blagoveshchensky District is one of the twenty in the oblast. The city of Blagoveshchensk serves as its administrative center, despite being incorporated separately as an urban okrug—an administrative unit with the status equal to that of the districts.

As a municipal division, the district is incorporated as Blagoveshchensky Municipal District. Blagoveshchensk Urban Okrug is incorporated separately from the district.
