= List of rural localities in Sakhalin Oblast =

Map of Russia with Sakhalin Oblast highlighted

This is a list of rural localities in Sakhalin Oblast. Sakhalin Oblast (Russian: Сахали́нская о́бласть, romanized: Sahalínskaja óblastj, IPA: [səxɐˈlʲinskəjə ˈobləsʲtʲ]) is a federal subject of Russia (an oblast) comprising the island of Sakhalin and the Kuril Islands in the Russian Far East. The oblast has an area of 87,100 square kilometers (33,600 sq mi). Its administrative center and the largest city is Yuzhno-Sakhalinsk. Population: 497,973 (2010 Census). Besides people from other parts of the former Soviet Union and the Korean Peninsula, the oblast is home to Nivkhs and Ainu, with the latter having lost their language in Sakhalin recently. Sakhalin is rich in natural gas and oil, and is Russia's second wealthiest federal subject. It borders Khabarovsk Krai to the west and Hokkaido, Japan to the south.

== Locations ==
- Yuzhno-Sakhalinsk
- Chekhov
- Gornozavodsk
- Goryachiye Klyuchi
- Krabozavodskoye
- Malokurilskoye
- Nysh
- Pogibi

== See also ==
- Lists of rural localities in Russia
