= Chyorny Mys =

Chyorny Mys (Russian: Чёрный Мыс) is the name of several rural localities in Russia:

- Chyorny Mys, Khabarovsk Krai, a selo in Komsomolsky District of Khabarovsk Krai
- Chyorny Mys, Kolyvansky District, Novosibirsk Oblast, a village in Kolyvansky District of Novosibirsk Oblast
- Chyorny Mys, Ubinsky District, Novosibirsk Oblast, a selo in Ubinsky District of Novosibirsk Oblast

== See also ==
- Mys-Chyorny, a rural locality in Murmansk Oblast
