= Pogibi =

Rural locality in Sakhalin Oblast, Russia

Coordinates: 52°13′21″N 141°39′03″E

Pogibi (Russian: Погиби) is a rural locality (a selo) in Sakhalin Oblast, Russia. It is located at Cape Pogibi, the closest point on the island of Sakhalin to the Russian mainland, only 7.5 km across the Strait of Nevelskoy at this point.

== Transport ==
During the years 1950–53, the Soviet Union under Joseph Stalin began construction of a tunnel linking Sakhalin with the mainland, with its western (mainland) portal at Cape Lazarev and its eastern (island) portal at Pogibi. The project would have also entailed building a railway connecting Pogibi with the settlement of Pobedino in central Sakhalin, which at the time was the northernmost extent of the Sakhalin Railway. Construction stopped after Stalin's death, without any new track having built on Sakhalin; however the island's rail system was later extended northwards to Nogliki and Okha.

There have recently been new proposals to build either a bridge or a tunnel to connect the railway systems of the mainland and Sakhalin, which again would enter the island via Cape Pogibi. Should the railway systems be connected by this bridge, the narrow gauge (1,067 mm (3 ft 6 in)) tracks on the island would be converted to the 1,520 mm (4 ft 11 27/32 in) gauge of the mainland.

== Climate ==
Climate data for Pogibi
Month	Jan	Feb	Mar	Apr	May	Jun	Jul	Aug	Sep	Oct	Nov	Dec	Year
Record high °C (°F)	0.6 (33.1)	0.5 (32.9)	8.0 (46.4)	13.0 (55.4)	18.9 (66.0)	27.0 (80.6)	25.5 (77.9)	27.3 (81.1)	24.7 (76.5)	17.6 (63.7)	9.5 (49.1)	3.4 (38.1)	27.3 (81.1)
Mean daily maximum °C (°F)	−14.4 (6.1)	−13.0 (8.6)	−6.1 (21.0)	0.9 (33.6)	6.2 (43.2)	13.6 (56.5)	17.7 (63.9)	18.9 (66.0)	15.7 (60.3)	7.3 (45.1)	−3.8 (25.2)	−12.2 (10.0)	2.6 (36.6)
Daily mean °C (°F)	−18.5 (−1.3)	−18.2 (−0.8)	−11.7 (10.9)	−3.1 (26.4)	3.0 (37.4)	10.1 (50.2)	14.6 (58.3)	15.9 (60.6)	12.4 (54.3)	4.4 (39.9)	−6.7 (19.9)	−15.8 (3.6)	−1.1 (30.0)
Mean daily minimum °C (°F)	−22.4 (−8.3)	−22.7 (−8.9)	−16.6 (2.1)	−6.4 (20.5)	0.7 (33.3)	7.5 (45.5)	12.1 (53.8)	13.2 (55.8)	9.5 (49.1)	1.8 (35.2)	−9.5 (14.9)	−19.3 (−2.7)	−4.3 (24.2)
Record low °C (°F)	−44.0 (−47.2)	−40.7 (−41.3)	−37.0 (−34.6)	−28.3 (−18.9)	−10.6 (12.9)	−1.9 (28.6)	2.2 (36.0)	−1.5 (29.3)	−3.0 (26.6)	−17.2 (1.0)	−29.4 (−20.9)	−41.0 (−41.8)	−44.0 (−47.2)
Average precipitation mm (inches)	26 (1.0)	21 (0.8)	28 (1.1)	27 (1.1)	44 (1.7)	55 (2.2)	59 (2.3)	78 (3.1)	70 (2.8)	65 (2.6)	32 (1.3)	29 (1.1)	534 (21.1)
Source: pogoda.ru.net

== See also ==
- Yuzhno-Sakhalinsk
- 1995 Neftegorsk earthquake
