= Sakhalin Railway =

Railway line in Sakhalin Oblast, Russia

Coordinates: 46.61950°N 142.76757°E

Sakhalin Railway Division
- Sakhalin railway network

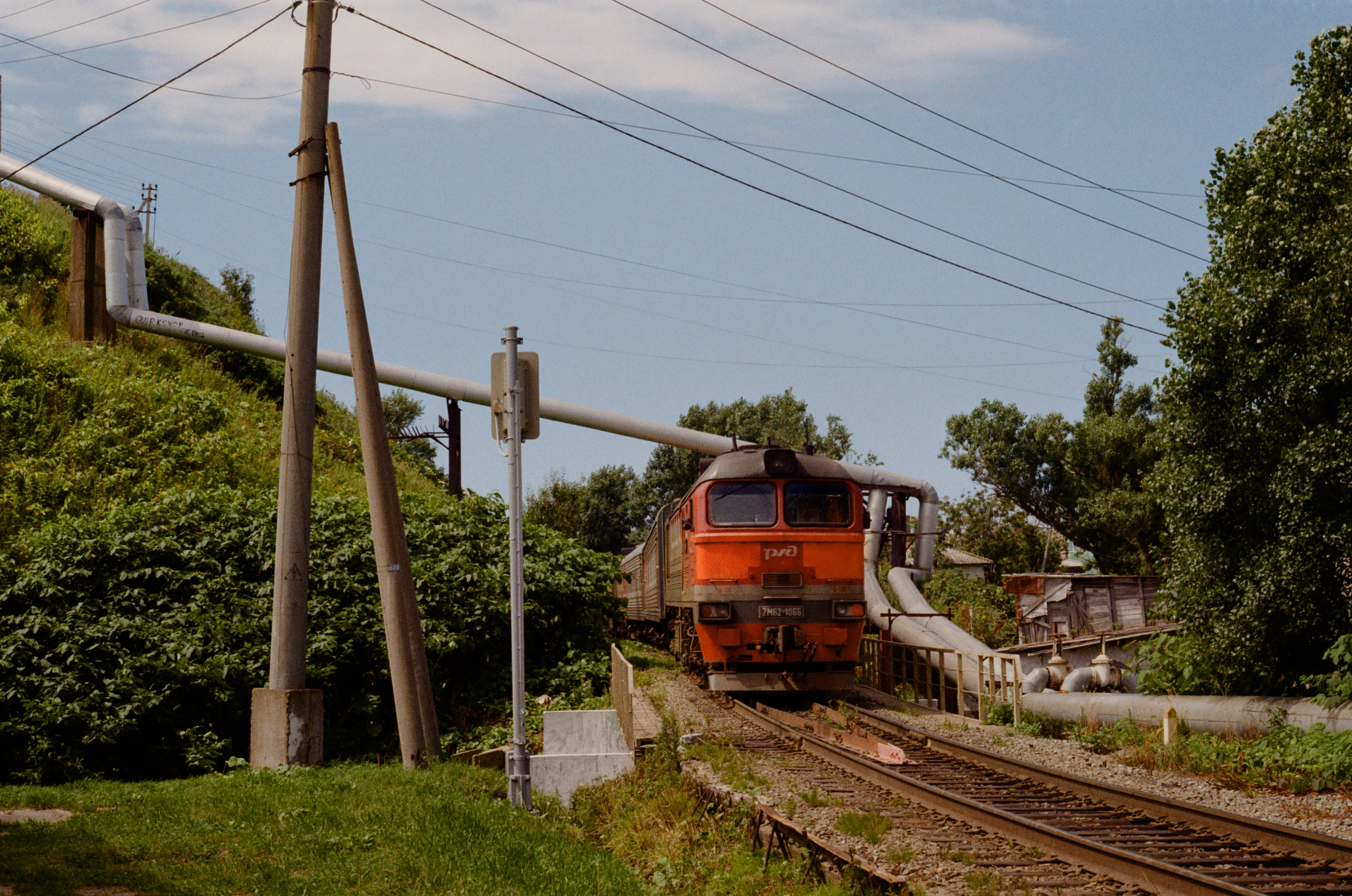
- Sakhalin Railway in Kholmsk

Overview
- Native name: Сахалинская железная дорога
- Owner: Government of Russia
- Area served: Sakhalin Island
- Locale: Sakhalin Oblast, Russia
- Transit type: Heavy rail
- Number of stations: 84
- Headquarters: Yuzhno-Sakhalinsk

Operation
- Began operation: 1945
- Operator: Russian Railways
- Infrastructure manager: Far Eastern Railway

Technical
- System length: 804.9 km (500.1 mi)
- No. of tracks: 1
- Track gauge: 1,520 mm (4 ft 11 27/32 in) Russian gauge
- Old gauge: 1,067 mm (3 ft 6 in)

Sakhalin Railway (Russian: Сахалинская железная дорога) is a division of the Far Eastern Railway that primarily serves Sakhalin Island. It is one out of two isolated Russian broad gauge railways; the other being the Norilsk railway. In the case of Sakhalin Railway, the isolation is due to the railway being located on an island. The only rail connection to the mainland is the Vanino–Kholmsk train ferry. Sakhalin Railway management is located at Yuzhno-Sakhalinsk.

== History ==
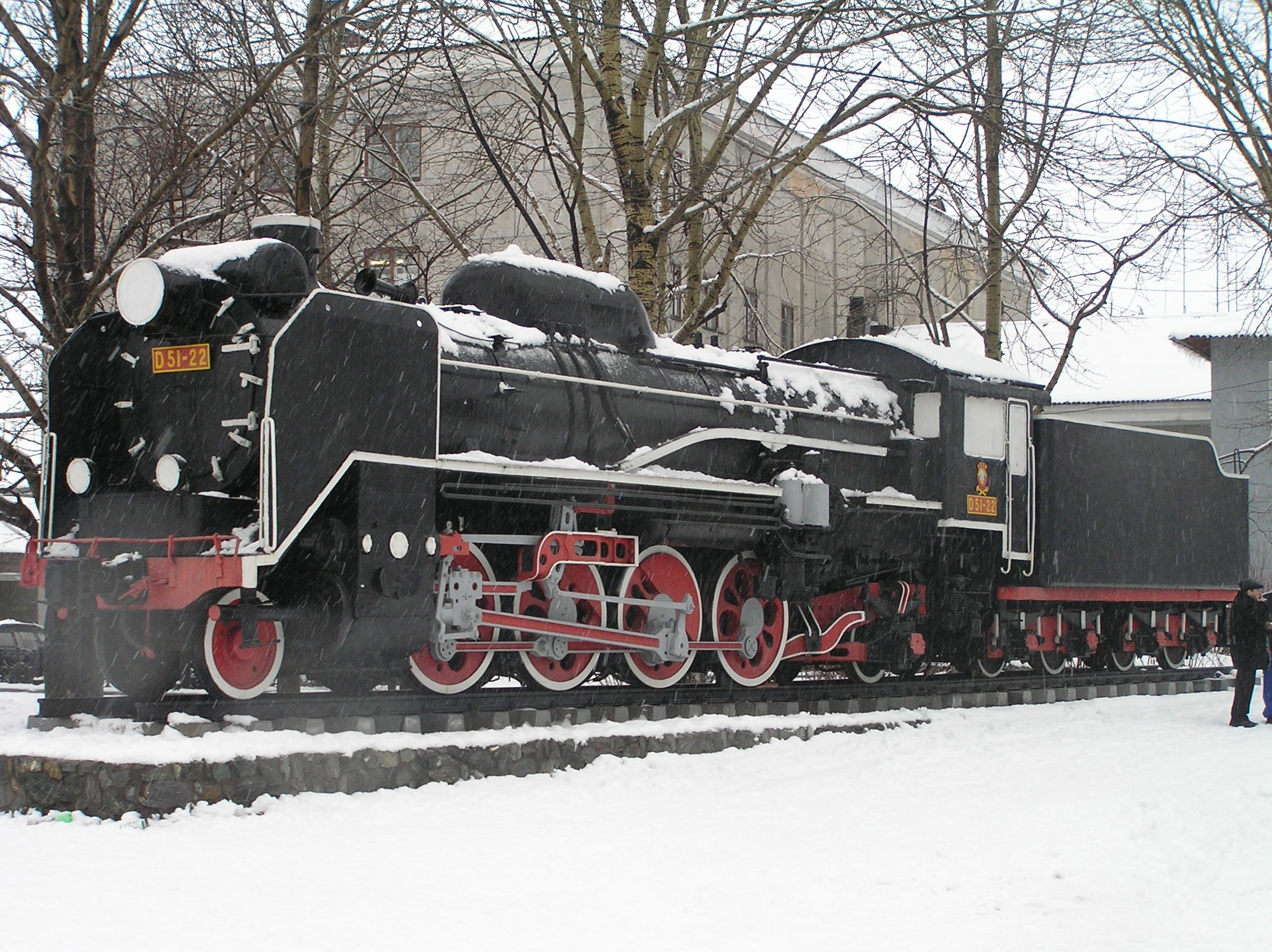
A Japanese D51 steam locomotive outside the Yuzhno-Sakhalinsk railway station

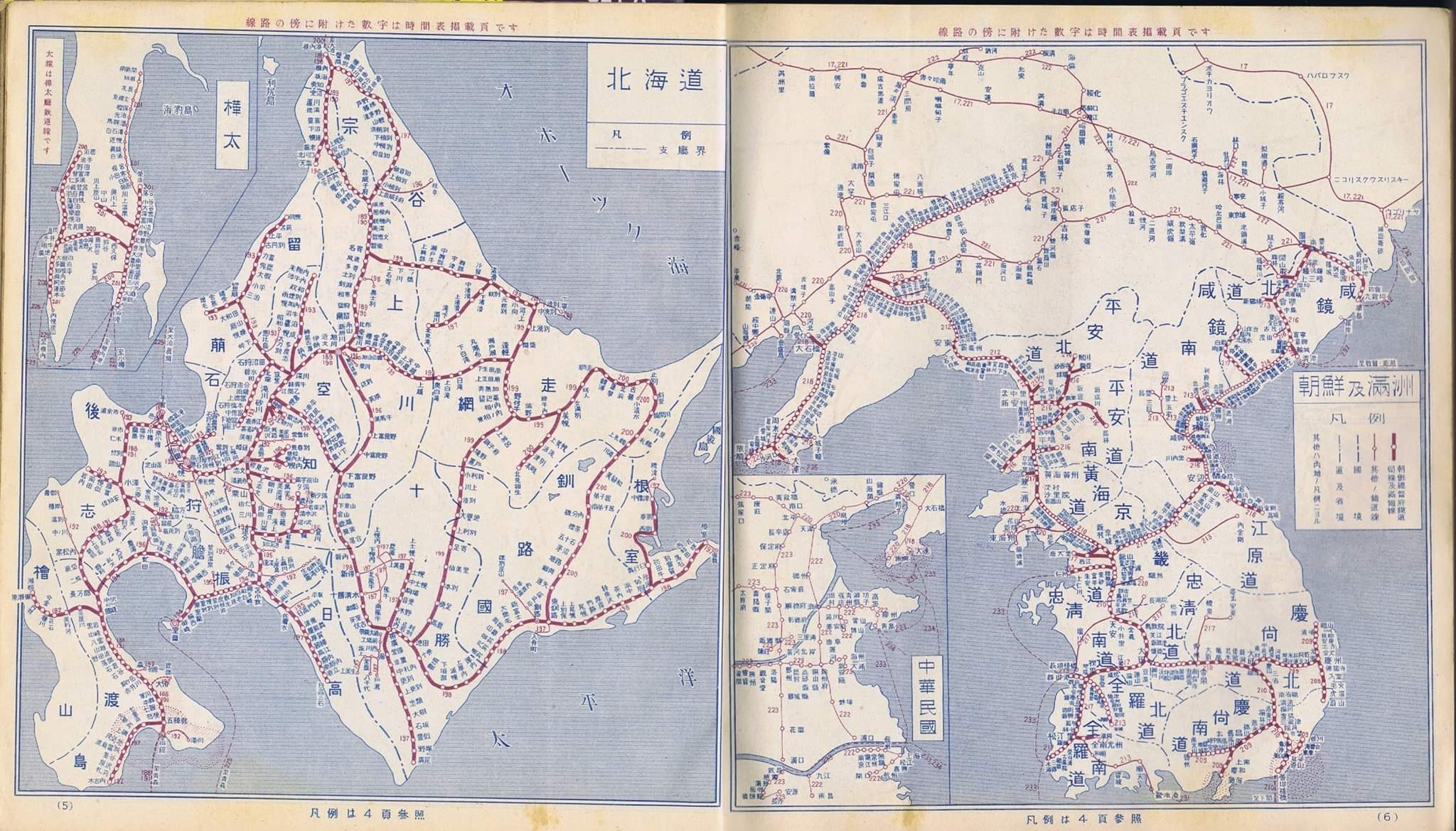
Japanese Government Railways map of Hokkaido, Chosen, Karafuto, and Manchukuo

The Treaty of Portsmouth following the Russo-Japanese War of 1904-05 placed the northern half of Sakhalin under the control of the Russian Empire, whilst the southern half (Karafuto) was under control of Japan.

On the Japanese half of the island, a 42.5-kilometre-long (26.4 mi) railway was built from Korsakov (大泊 (Ōtomari)) to Yuzhno-Sakhalinsk (豊原 (Toyohara)), with a gauge of 600 mm (1 ft 11 5/8 in). This section was later converted to the normal Japanese railway gauge of 1,067 mm (3 ft 6 in).

In 1911, a 64 km (40 mi) branch was built from Yuzhno-Sakhalinsk to Starodubskoye (Sakaehama). Between 1918 and 1921, the towns of Nevelsk (本斗 (Honto)), Kholmsk (真岡 (Maoka)), Chekhov (野田 (Noda)) and Tomari (泊居 (Tomarioru)) were also connected to the network. The Japanese railway network consisted of the Western Karafuto Railway from Naihoro (Gornozavodsk) to Tomarioru, and the Eastern Karafuto Railways from Otomari to Koton (Pobedino) until 1944. Its total length was over 1,225 km (761 mi).

After the Second World War, control of the whole of the island passed to the Soviet Union, including the island's complete rail network and rolling stock. Wagons from the Soviet railways were re-gauged for use on the island. The locomotive factory in Lyudinovo produced diesel locomotives of the models TG16 and TG21 specifically for use on the island's narrow gauge network. Additionally, trains were imported from Japan, such as the purpose-made A1 sets made by Hitachi Rail and Teikoku Sharyo (1958-1960), followed by the D2 sets made by Fuji Heavy Industries (1986) and ex-JNR KiHa 58 railcars, purchased second hand in the early 1990s.

The Soviet era saw the network extend into the north of the island, with a total extent in 1992 of 2,500 km (1,600 mi). By 2006, little-used sections such as Dachnoye–Aniva and Dolinsk–Starodubskoye had been closed, but the network still had a total length of 2,025 km (1,258 mi).

In 1992, the Sakhalin Railway was split from the Far Eastern Railway and made its own administrative entity. It reverted to being part of the Far Eastern Railway in 2010.

In 1994, the treacherous Yuzhno-Sakhalinsk to Kholmsk route was closed. Its "Devil's Bridge" remains a tourist attraction. Trains from Yuzhno-Sakhalinsk to Kholmsk have since taken the circuitous route via Tomari.

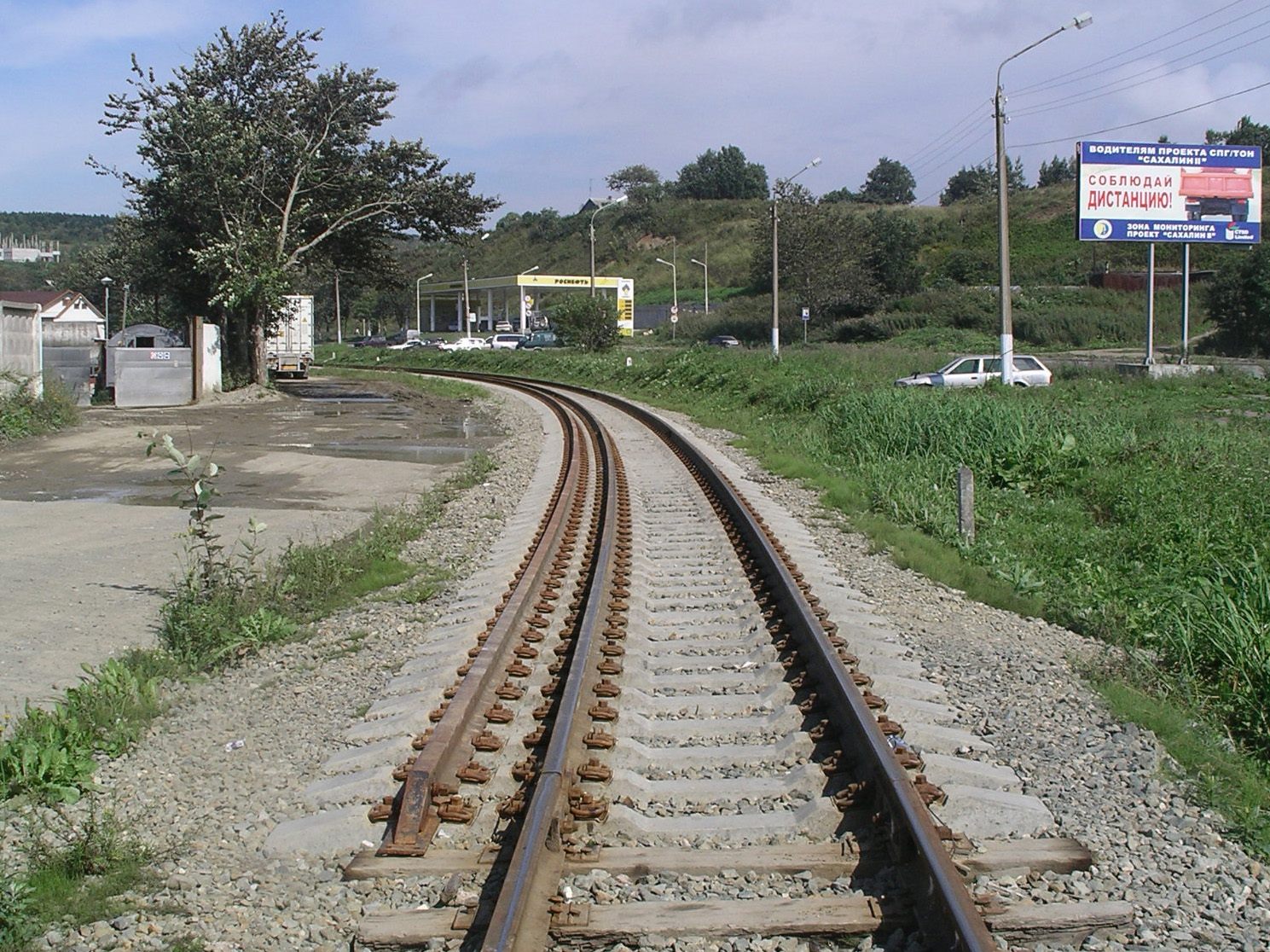
The new track 1,067 mm (3 ft 6 in) / 1,520 mm (4 ft 11 27/32 in)

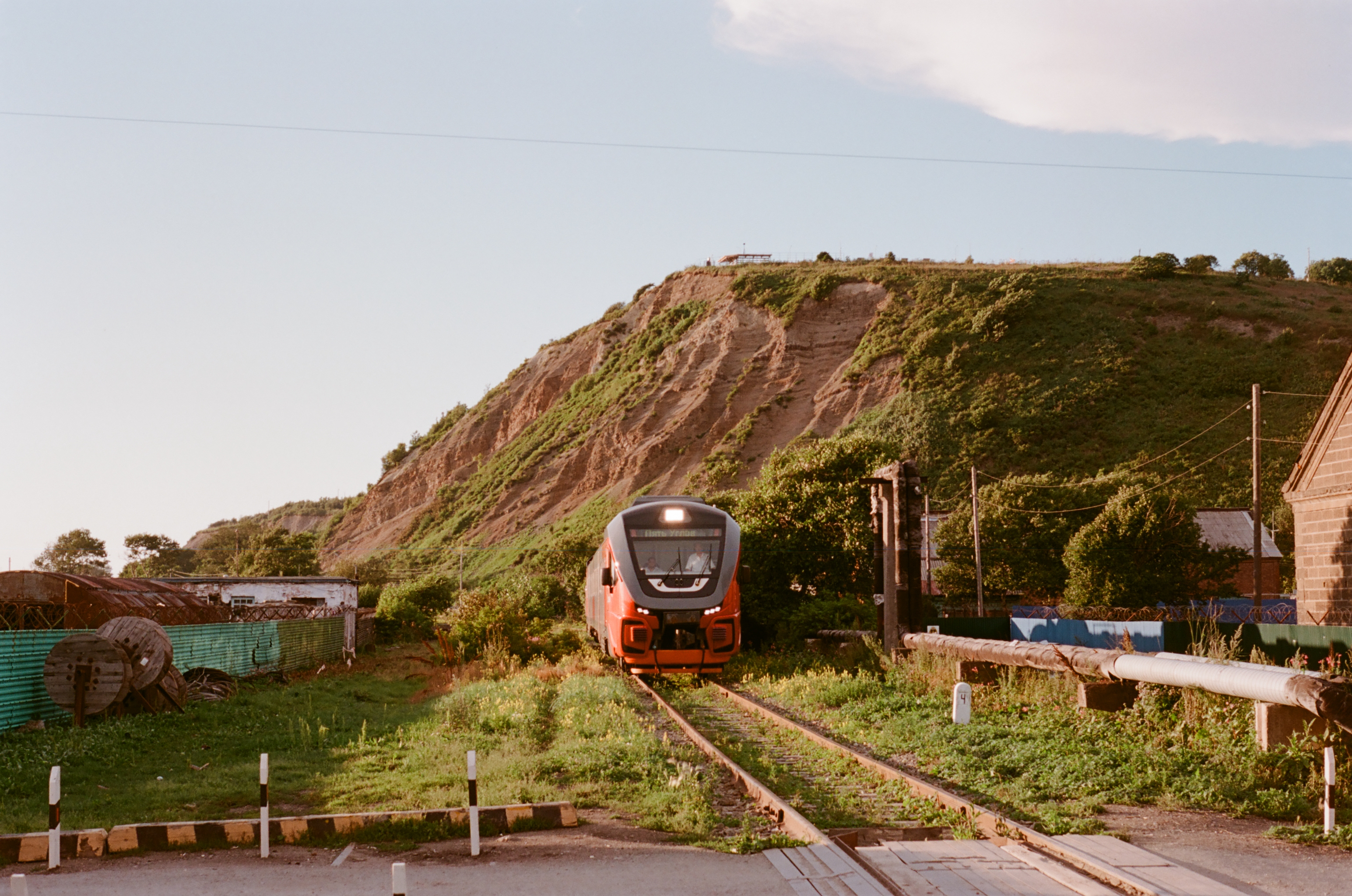
Contemporary era of railway after re-gauge, DMU RA3-026 in Korsakov (2022)

In order to allow regular Russian trains to run on the island, the island's rail network underwent conversion to Russian broad gauge starting from 2003. Russian Railways formally completed the regauging work in August 2019. Last scheduled train on 1067mm line Holmsk-77km pk9 was run at 30 September 2020.

== Future prospects ==
=== Potential connection to the mainland ===
Chronology of railways in Sakhalin

The Soviet Union under Joseph Stalin planned to construct a tunnel between Sakhalin and the Russian mainland, which would have linked Sakhalin to the rest of the Soviet rail network. The project was begun using forced labor between 1950 and 1953 but was canceled after Stalin's death.

Since 1973, a train ferry has connected Vanino (on the mainland near Sovetskaya Gavan) with the town of Kholmsk on Sakhalin.

There have been some calls from politicians to revive the concept of building a bridge or tunnel between Sakhalin and the mainland, although there have been concerns that the costs of the project would outweigh the benefits. However, Russian President Dimitry Medvedev announced his support for the project in November 2008, suggesting the link could be completed by 2030, with bridge rather than a tunnel, and far more northerly route. In February 2013, the Russian government announced plans to build the link, including it in the 2012–2015 federal transport plan. It would connect the Sakhalin Railway to the Baikal–Amur Mainline at Komsomolsk-on-Amur. The link, estimated at 21 billion rubles, would require about 925 km (575 mi) of new construction on the mainland, a 16 km (9.9 mi) bridge across the northernmost part of the Strait of Nevelskoy, and an additional 320 km (200 mi) of new track to connect the line to the existing network.

=== Potential connection to Hokkaido ===
There have also been proposals to connect the southern tip of Sakhalin to the Japanese island of Hokkaido via a 40-kilometre-long (25 mi) bridge or tunnel. This link would allow a direct land transport link for container traffic from Japan to the Asian mainland and Europe.

== Rolling stock ==
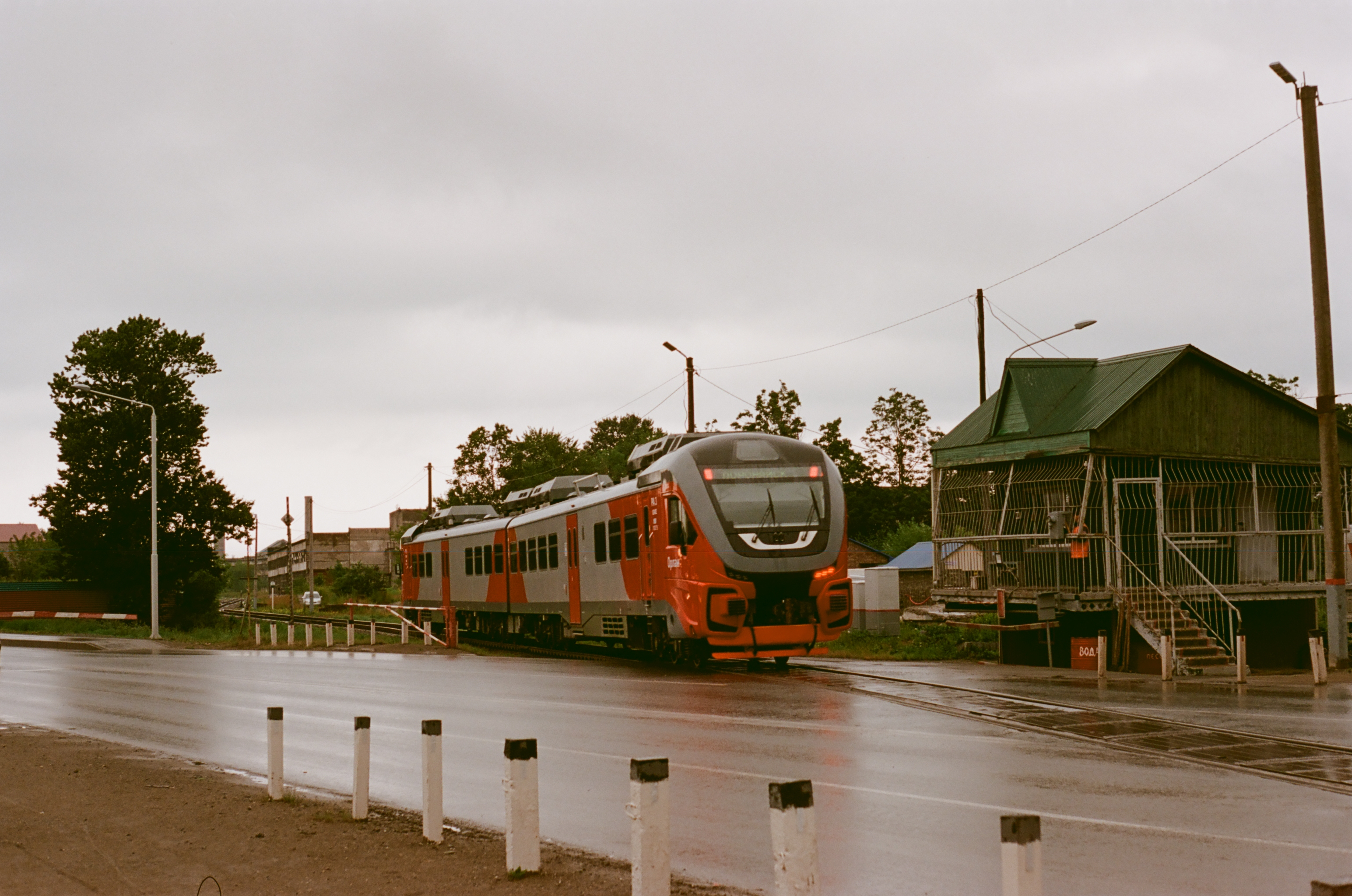
RA3

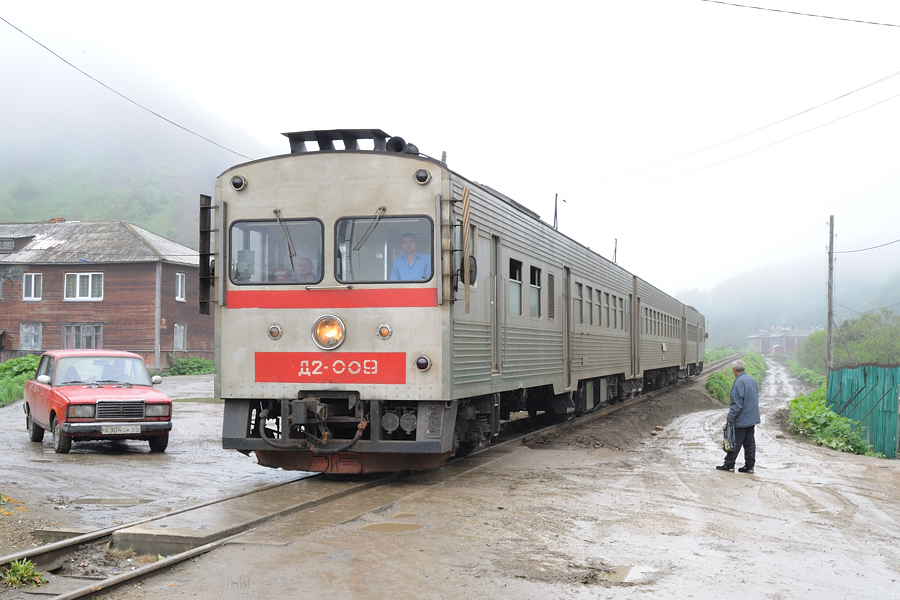
Д2

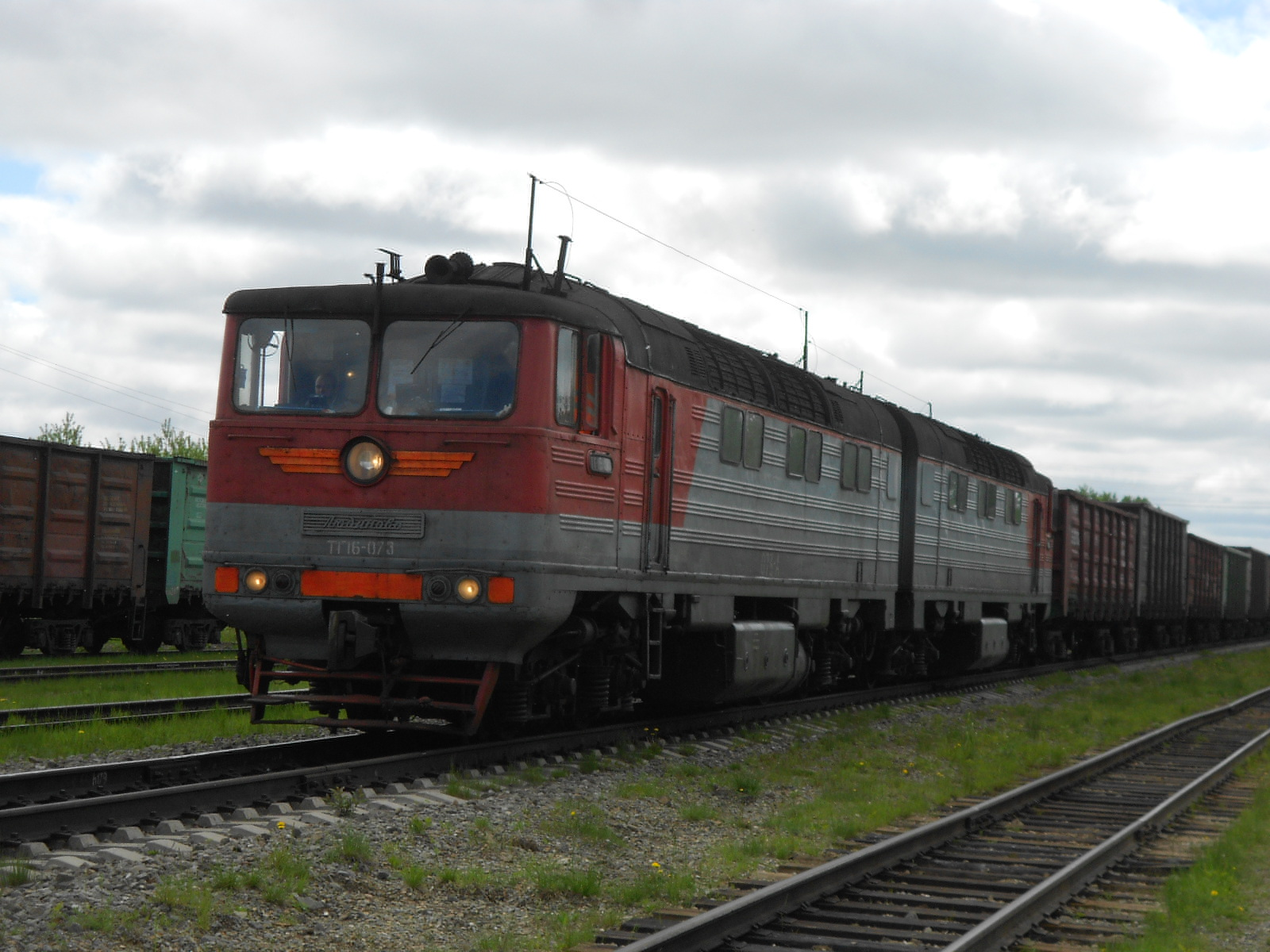
ТГ16 - 073

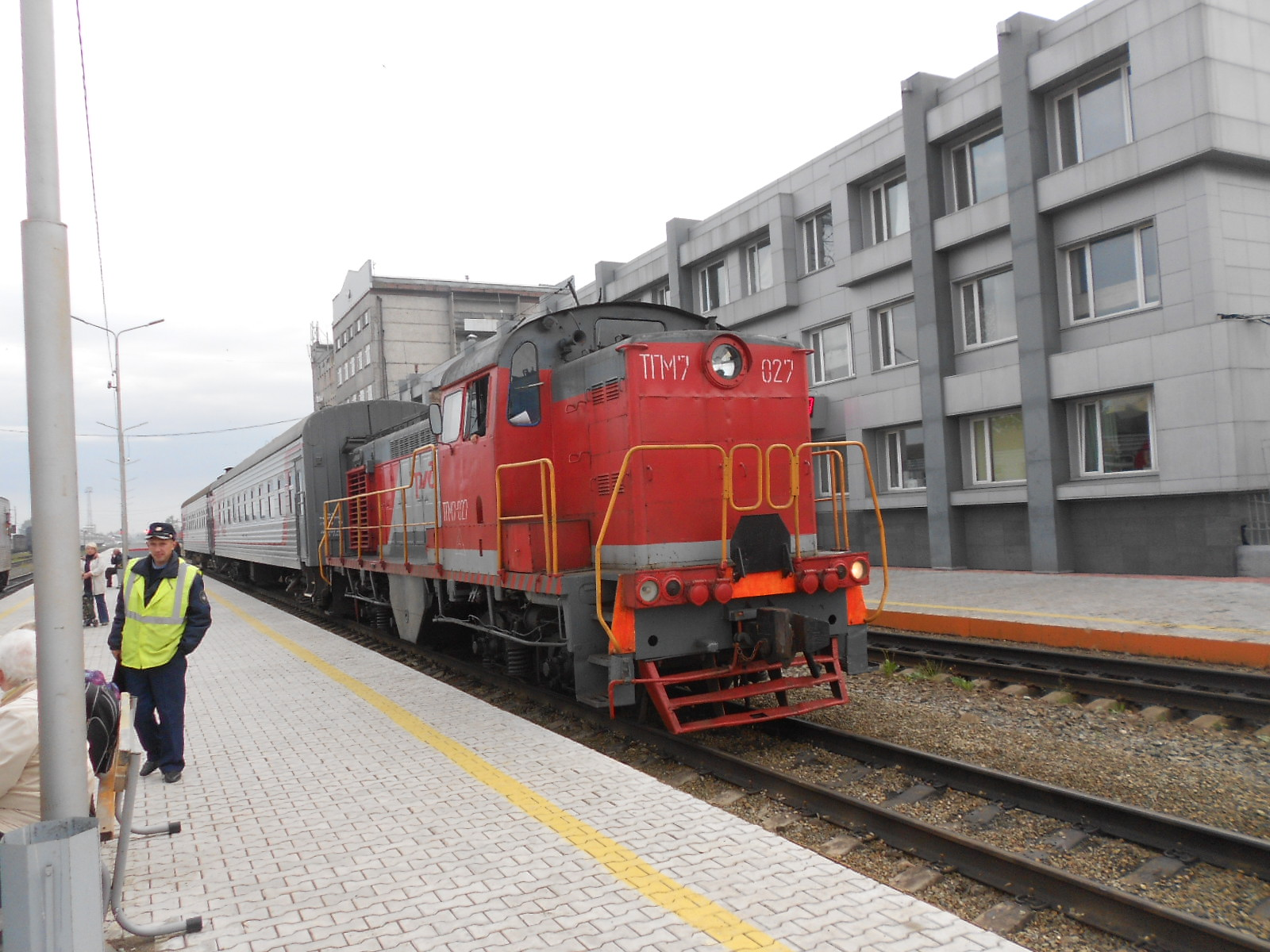
ТГМ7-027 in Yuzhno-Sakhalinsk

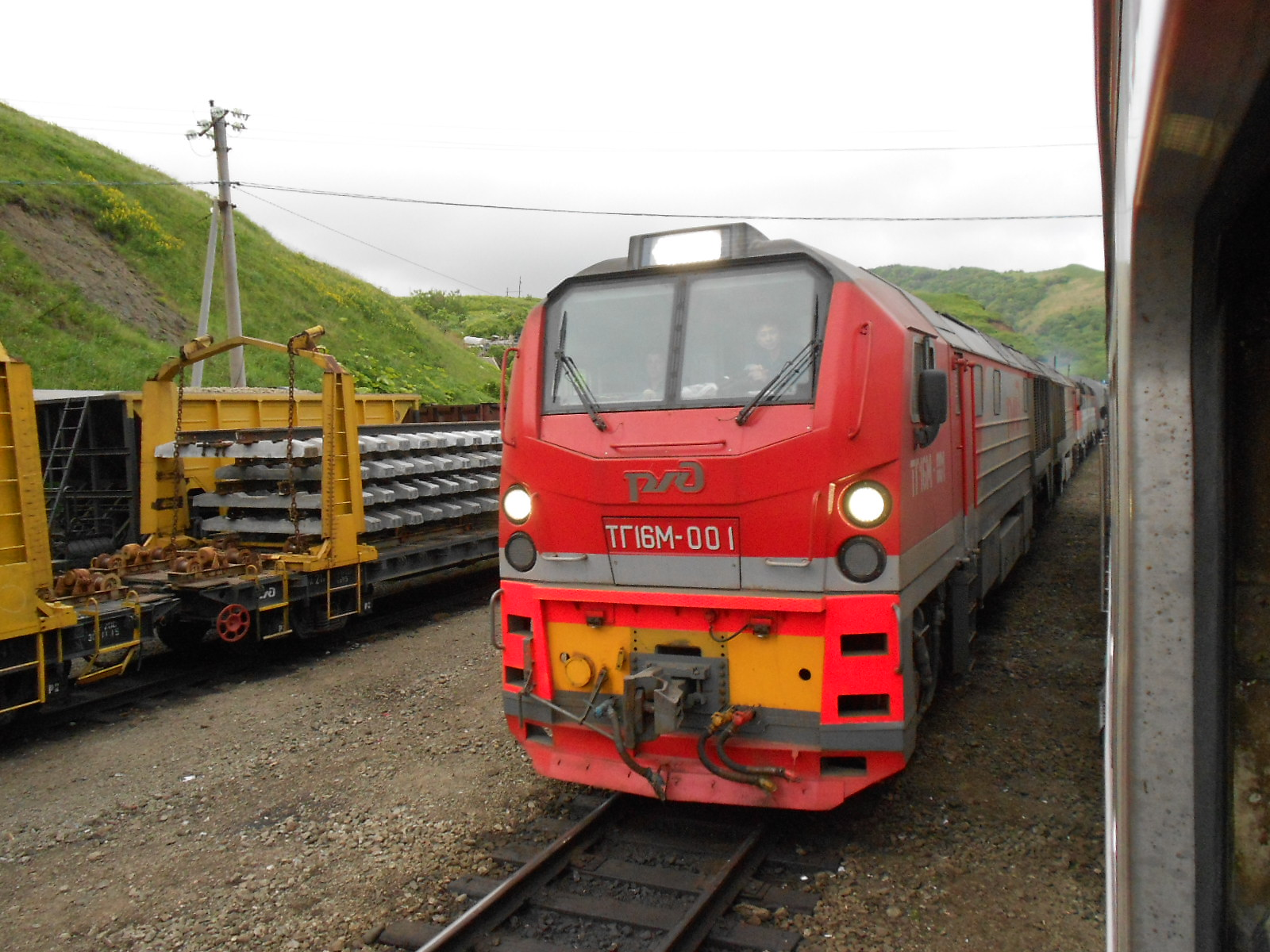
TG16M in Chekhov

== See also ==
- Bogie exchange
- Vanino–Kholmsk train ferry
- Sakhalin Tunnel
- Sakhalin–Hokkaido Tunnel
- Newfoundland Railway: The railway was in a similar situation (until 1988) and remote location.
