= Selikhino =

Selikhino Селихино
- Village
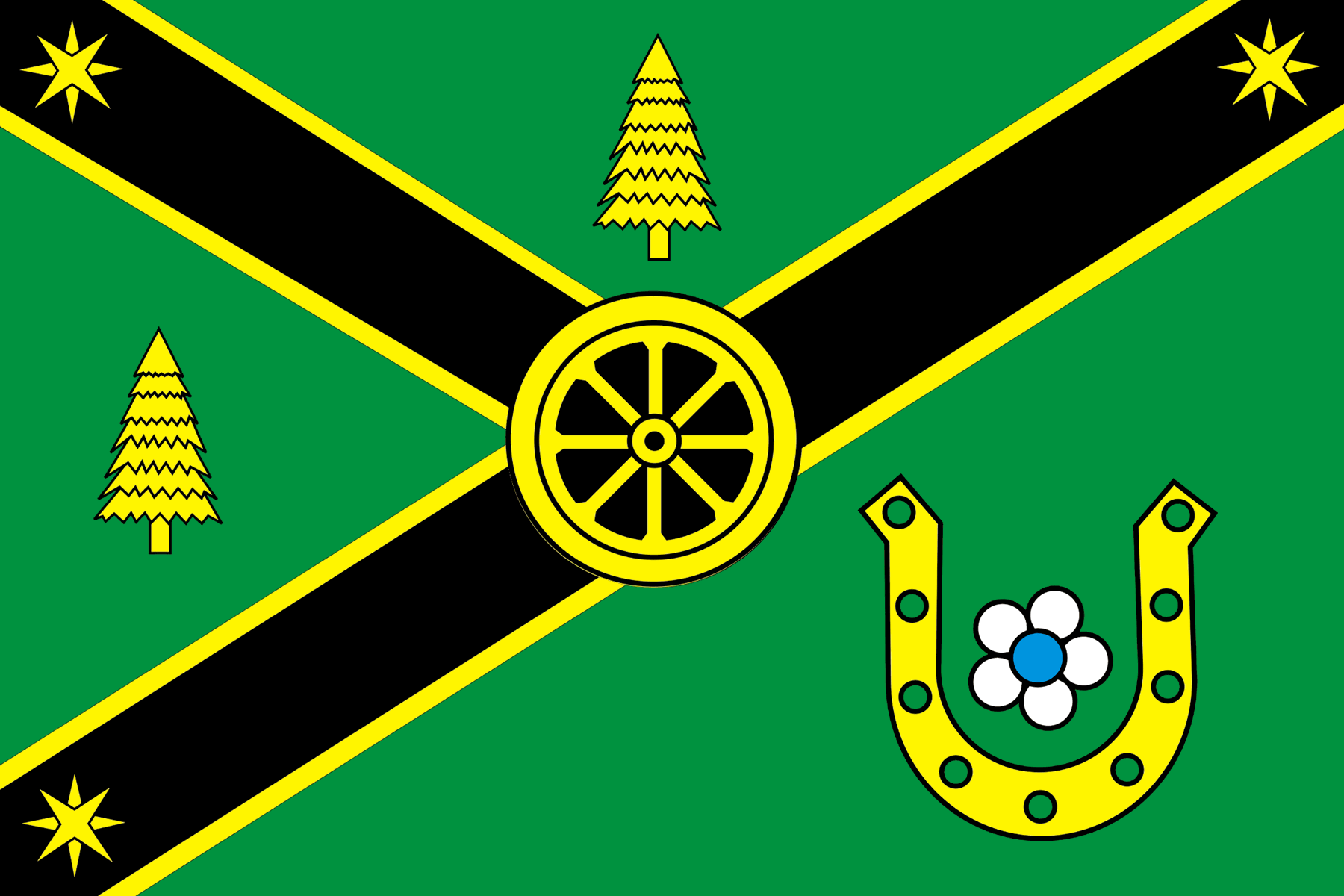
- Flag

- Location within Khabarovsk Krai Location within Russia
- Coordinates: 50°22′08″N 137°30′16″E
- Country: Russia
- Region: Khabarovsk Krai
- District: Komsomolsky District
- Time zone: UTC+10:00

Selikhino (Russian: Селихино) is a rural locality (a selo) in Komsomolsky District of Khabarovsk Krai, Russia. Population: 4,255 (2010 census); 4,865 (2002 census).

== Geography ==
Selikhino is located by lake Khummi, on the Baikal-Amur Mainline railway, shortly after the railway leaves Komsomolsk-on-Amur towards Sovetskaya Gavan.

== History ==
Selikhino was the junction station for a railway built in the early 1950s by the Soviet Union under Joseph Stalin, intended to link to a tunnel to the island of Sakhalin. Construction of the tunnel was abandoned after Stalin's death; however, the railway had already been built as far as Chyorny Mys; this section was kept open for logging industry traffic until the 1990s.
