= Maritime State University =

Maritime university in Russia

- Морско́й госуда́рственный университе́т и́мени адмира́ла Г.И. Невельско́го
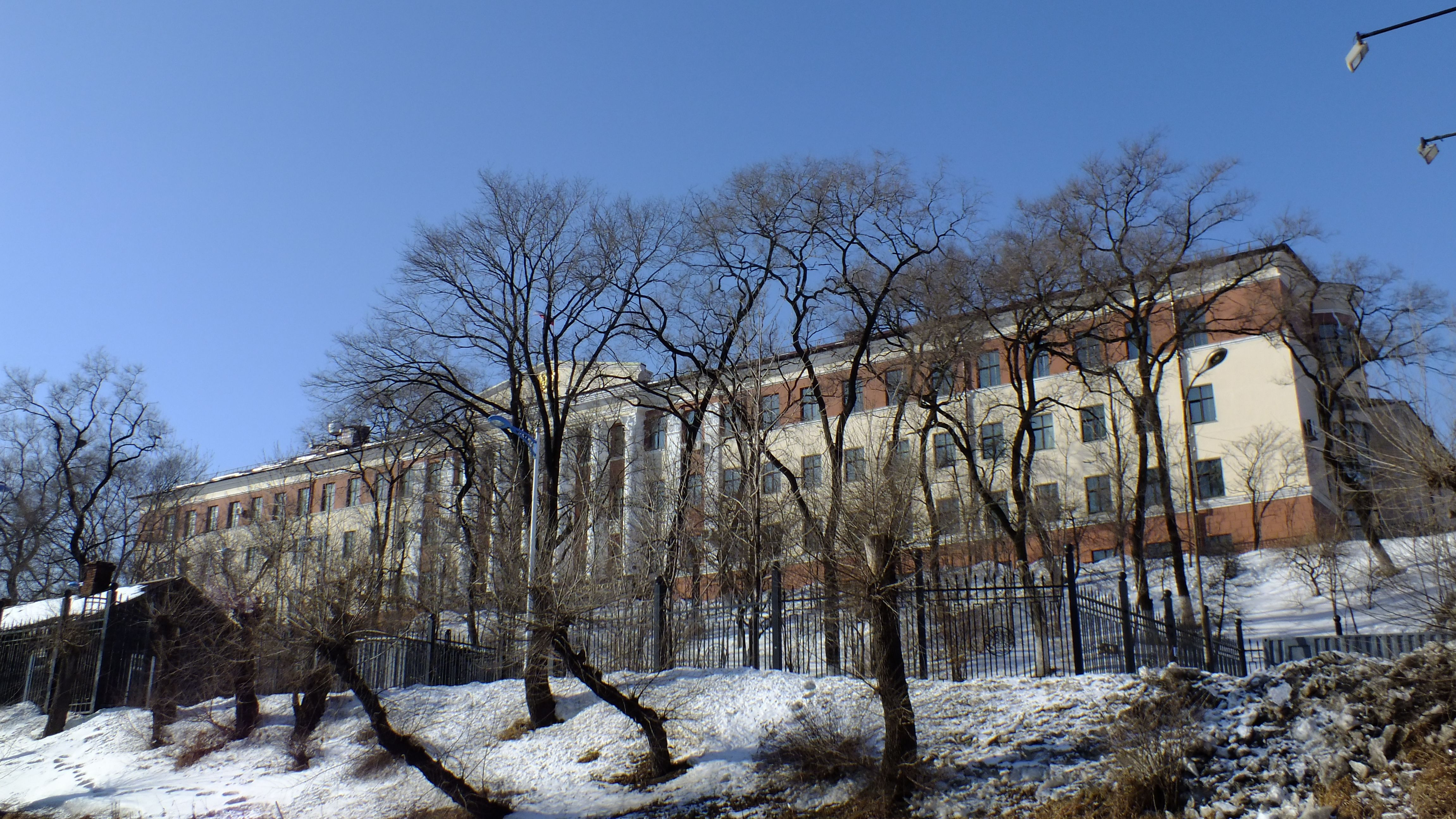
- Type: Public
- Established: 1890
- Location: Vladivostok, Russia; 43°06′11″N 131°52′05″E
- Website: msun.ru

Maritime State University (MSU) (Russian: Морско́й госуда́рственный университе́т и́мени адмира́ла Г.И. Невельско́го, romanized: G.I. Nevelskoi Maritime State University) is a maritime university in Vladivostok, Russia. It is named after G.I. Nevelskoi, in its full Russian name. The university aims to provide specialisation in maritime transport systems in the spheres of natural science, the humanities, technical and marine conventional trends.

Twelve scientific schools are working in the sphere of marine and engineers elaboration within the university. MSU prepares engineer-technical staff of 28 specialisations and specialties. MSU includes eleven institutes, sixteen faculties, the Maritime College, Human-Technical Lyceum, lyceum classes, and the School of Young Sailors and Kids' Studio.

== Structure ==
- The Institute "Maritime Academy";
- The Institute of Automation and Information Technologies;
- Maritime Technological Institute;
- Institute of Management;
- Sea Protection Institute;
- The Institute of Social and Political problems of Management;
- The Institute of Eastern Asia;
- Open Maritime Institute;
- Maritime Physics-Technological Institute;
- The Institute of Higher Qualification.

== University resources ==
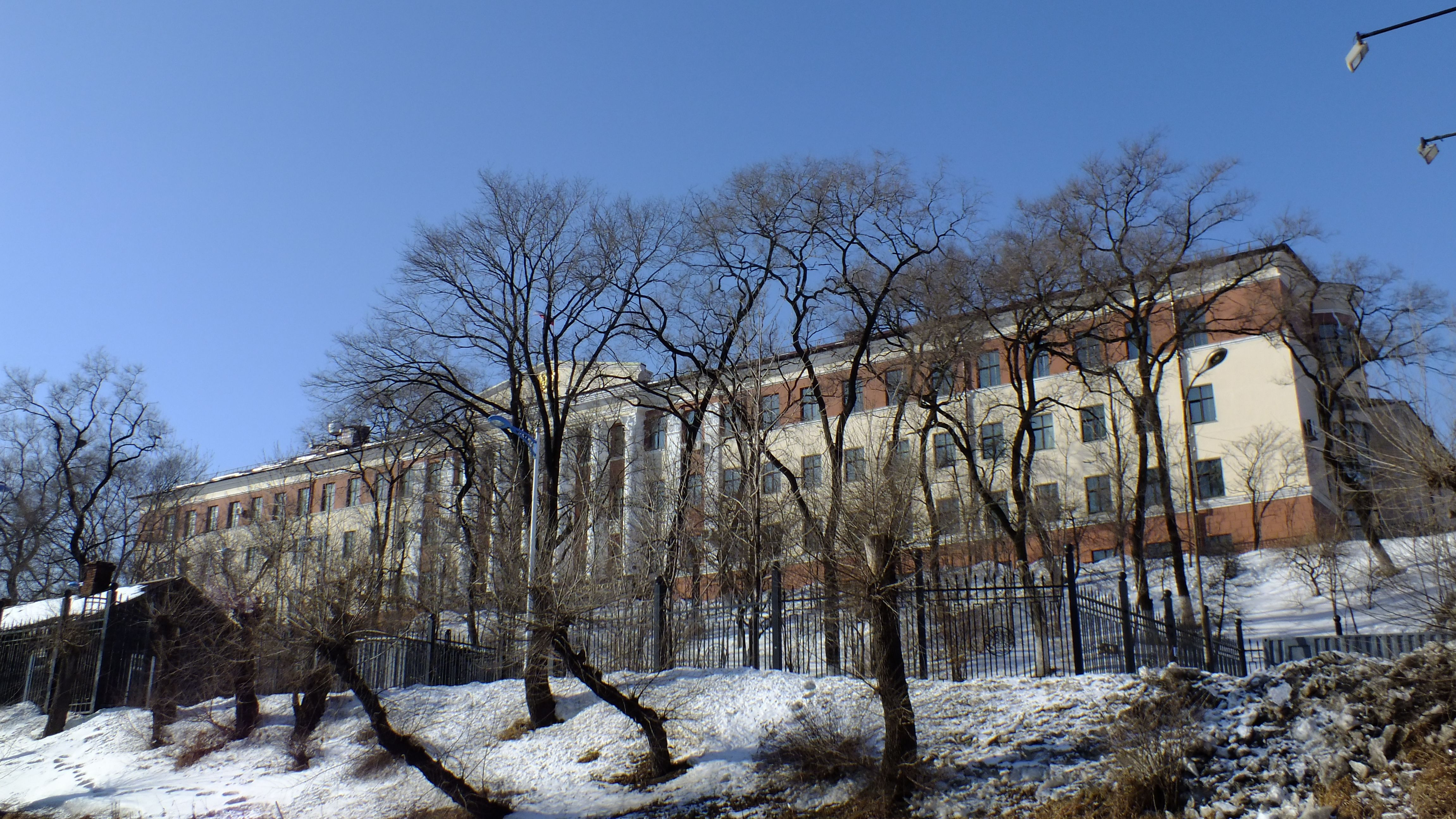
Maritime state university building

MSU has seven academic buildings, forty-six laboratories and studies, libraries, and ten professional training centers imitating ship equipment. MSU has a student cafeteria with two thousand seats, a medical center, eight dormitories for students.

MSU is one of the founders of the Pacific Ocean Law Institute. The university conducts research on transport problems. Since 1992, the university has its own shipping company FESMA, a training boat named Nadezhda, a cargo training ship named Vitya Chalenko, and a fishing boat named "Professor Phrolov".

== University sports ==
MSU has about twenty sport sections: swimming, volleyball, mini-football, shooting, various kinds of wrestling, tennis, ship design sports, among others.

== Expedition yacht Admiral Nevelskoi ==
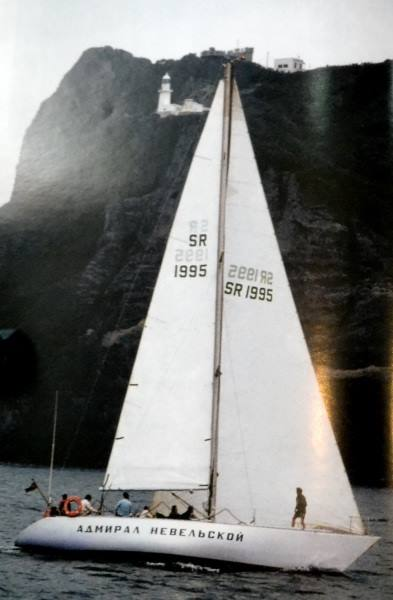
Yacht Admiral Nevelskoi

In July 1993, Professor Leonid Lysenko set out on a solo circumnavigation in the university's forty-foot-long (12-metre) Polish-built yacht Admiral Nevelskoi, calling initially in Taiwan, Hong Kong, the Aleutian Islands and California. In 1994, 1,500 miles (2,400 kilometres) west of Australia, the yacht's rudder and mast broke and Lysenko was picked up by a Ukrainian ship, abandoning the still-floating yacht . In 1997 the hull of a yacht was found drifting off Rodrigues Island, near Mauritius and brought ashore. After 2010, when the wreck was identified as the missing yacht, a proposal was developed for its restoration and the establishment of a private "Maritime Museum" in Mauritius by Bernard Eric Typhis Degtyarenko. This project started in 2010.

== International cooperation ==
Mutual cooperation of Pacific-Asian region countries have a good influence on the development of international relationships. Partners of MSU include some universities in China, Australian Maritime College, California State University Maritime Academy, Mokpo National Maritime University, Korea Maritime and Ocean University, and University of Trade Fleet, Tokyo.
