= Khummi =

Lake of Khabarovsk Krai

- Хумми
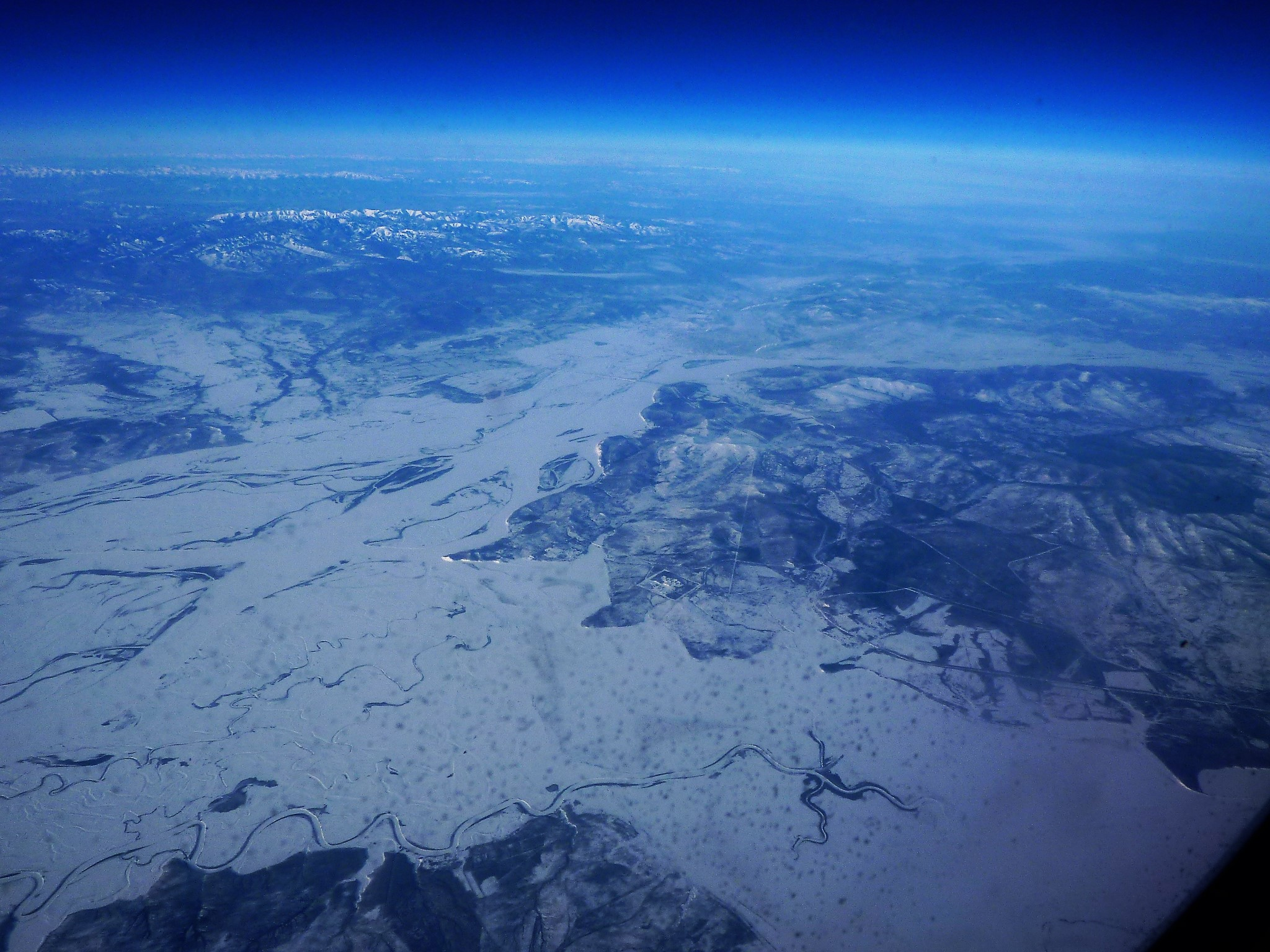
- Aerial picture of the lake

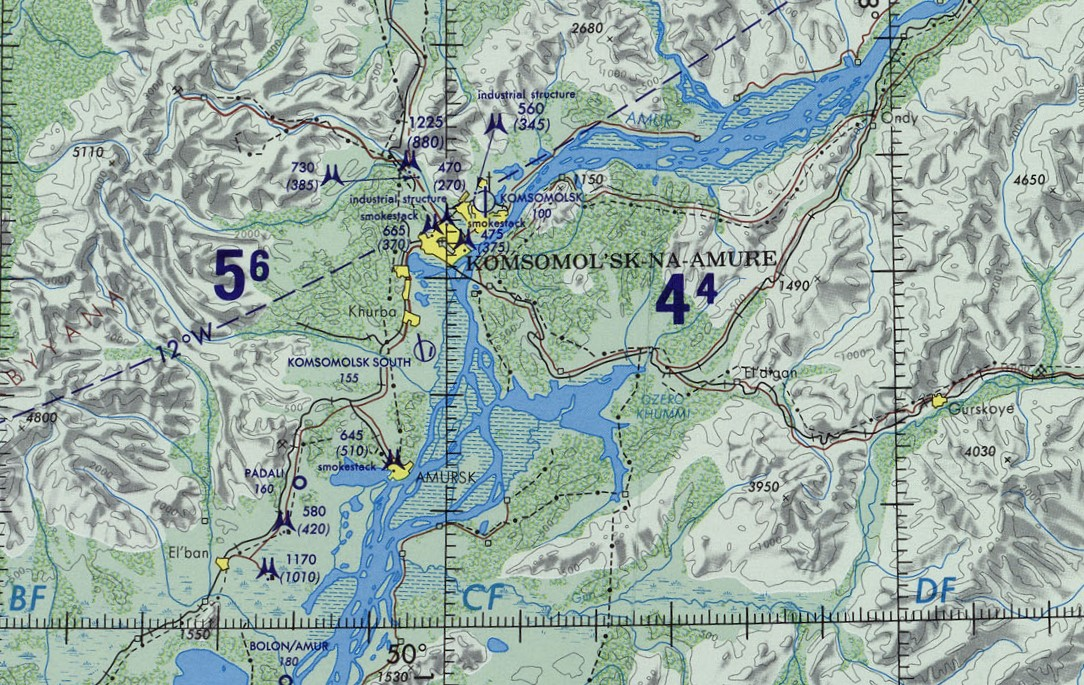
- Khummi map section

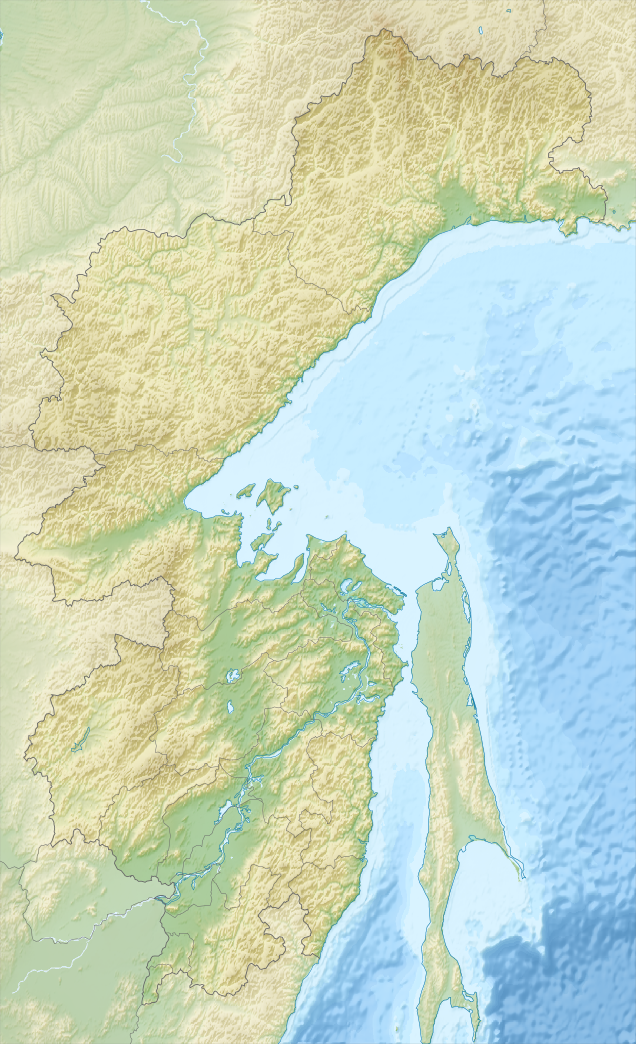
- Location in Khabarovsk Krai, Russian Far East
- Location: Khabarovsk Krai
- Coordinates: 50°19′17″N 137°16′31″E
- Type: Freshwater lake
- Catchment area: 1,560 km^{2} (600 sq mi)
- Basin countries: Russia
- Max. length: 23 km (14 mi)
- Max. width: 15 km (9.3 mi)
- Surface area: 117 km^{2} (45 sq mi)
- Average depth: 1.5 m (4.9 ft)
- Max. depth: 3.9 m (13 ft)
- Settlements: Komsomolsk-on-Amur

Lake Khummi (Russian: Хумми), also known as Khomi (Хоми), is a large freshwater lake in Komsomolsky District, Khabarovsk Krai, Russia. It has an area of 117 km^{2} (45 sq mi) and a maximum depth of 3.9 m (13 ft). The lake is part of the Amur river basin and lies near Komsomolsk-on-Amur, 32 km (20 mi) to the southeast of the city. The village of Selikhino, as well as a tourist resort, are located by the lakeshore.

The name of the lake originated in a Nanai word for "sandy sediment", "dead hollow" or "tiger's lair".

== History ==
Remains of ancient pottery of the Late Pleistocene period have been found at an archaeological site by the lake.

In 1997 a 1,403.7 hectares (3,469 acres) section of the banks of the lake was declared a protected area.

== Geography ==
Khummi is one of the largest lakes of Khabarovsk Krai and the 103rd lake in Russia in water surface. The lake is located in the Amur river floodplain and is connected to it by several channels. During floods the waters of the Amur fill the lake and increase its area. Khummi has a roughly triangular shape with the apex in the outflowing channels at the western end. The lake is relatively shallow and its bottom is mostly muddy.

== Flora and fauna ==
The banks of the lake are low and indented. They are largely covered with forest. The shoreline vegetation is poor owing to the sharp level fluctuations, but free-floating aquatic plants are common. Floating hearts, water snowflakes, and other types of Nymphoides, grow usually in the channels.

Taimen, lenok, kaluga and loach are among the fish species found in the waters of the lake. The Khummi fish fauna includes as well fish species that are listed in the Red Data Book of the Russian Federation, such as Chinese perch, black Amur bream, black carp and masu salmon.

== See also ==
- List of lakes of Russia
