= Gennady Nevelskoy =

Russian naval officer (1813–1876)

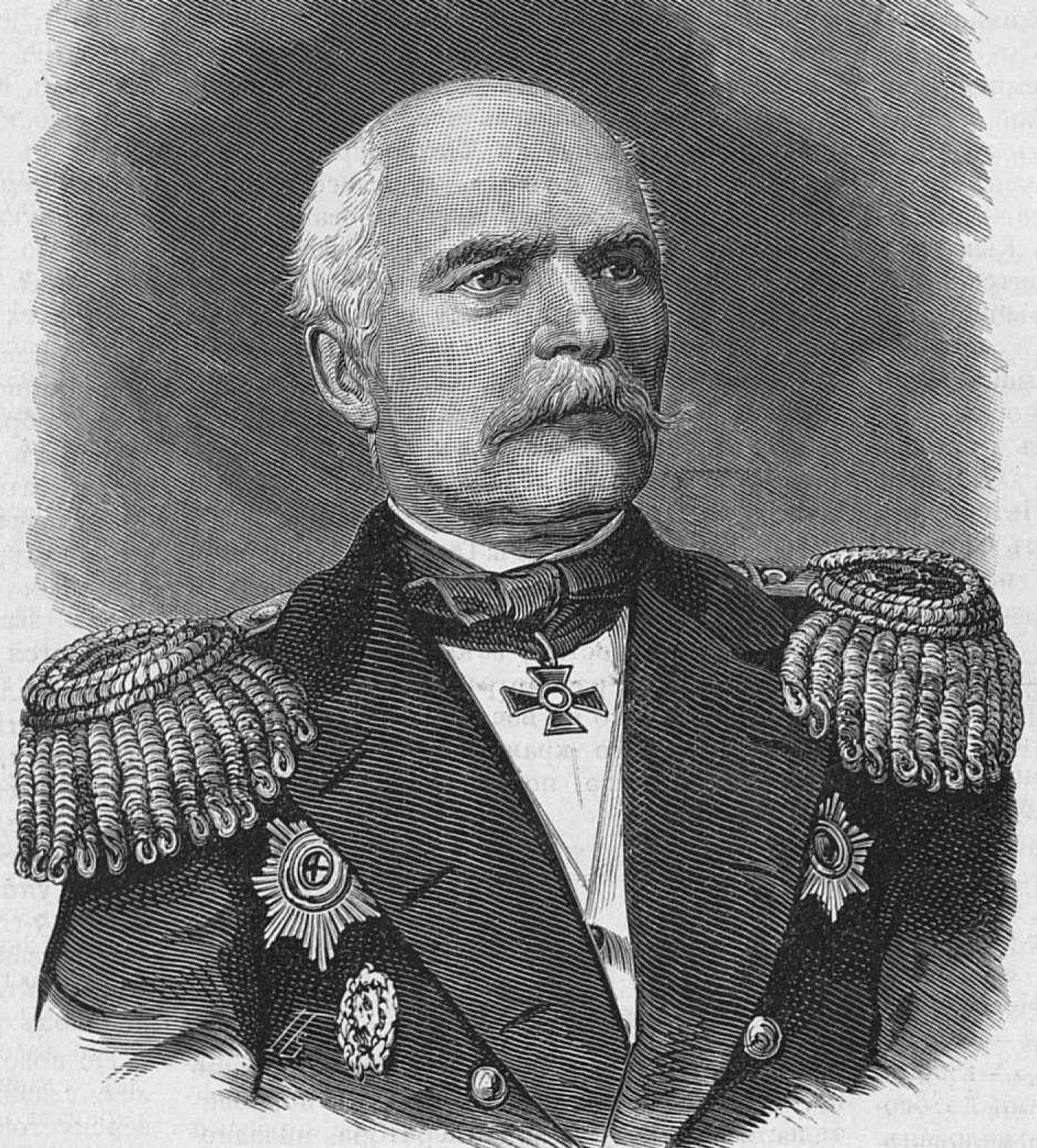
Gennady Nevelskoy

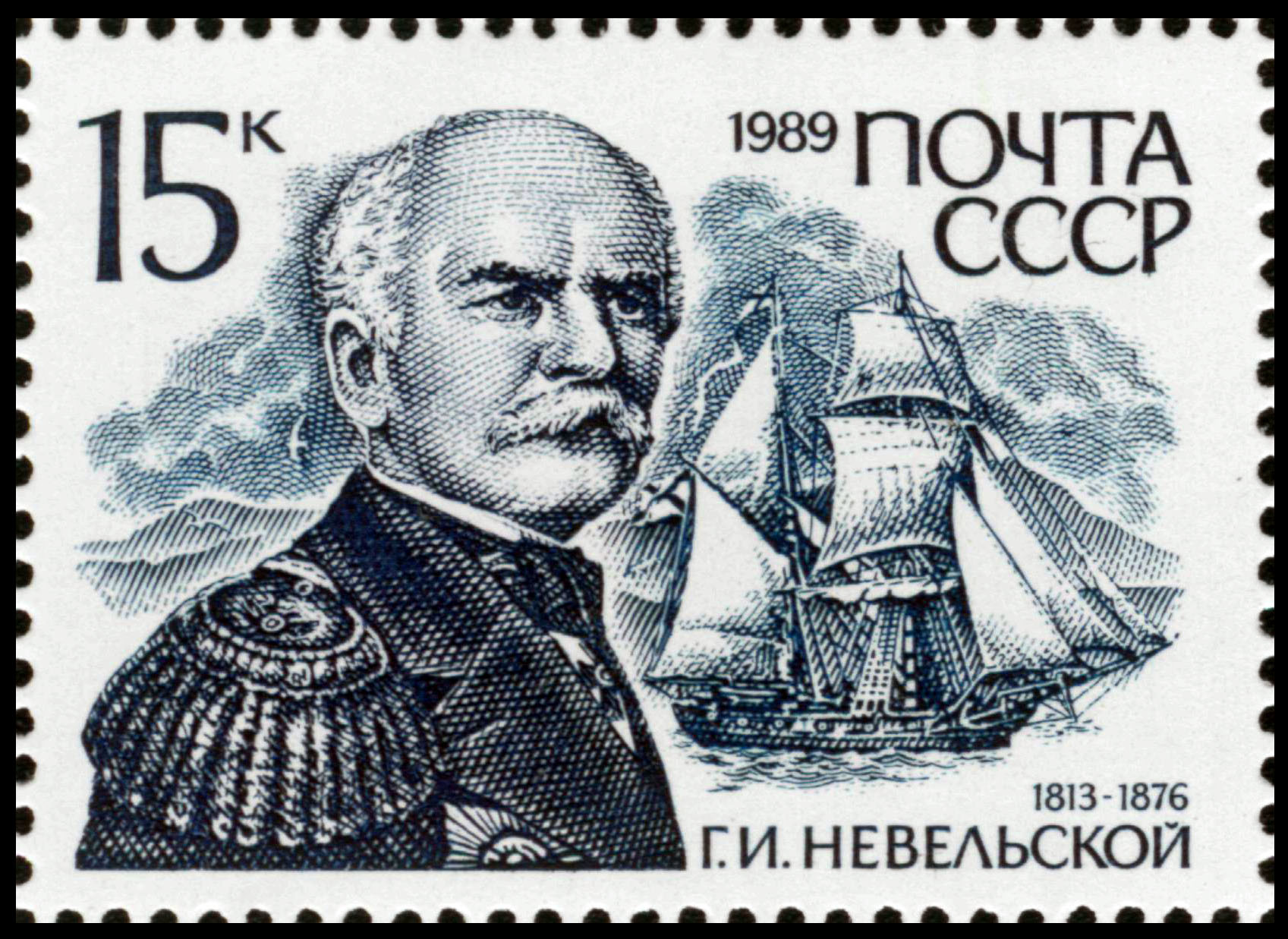
Nevelskoy on a 1989 Soviet commemorative stamp

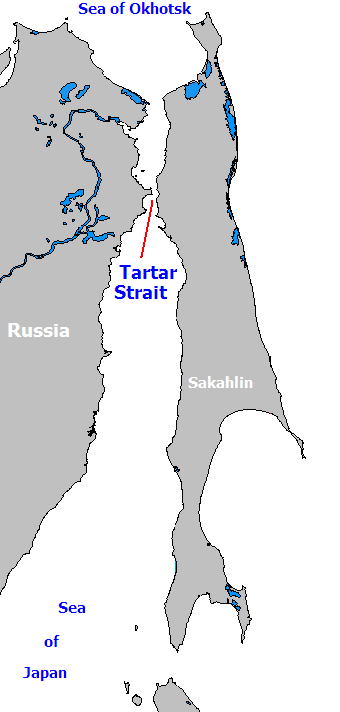
Nevelskoy Strait is the narrowest section of the Strait of Tartary

Gennady Ivanovich Nevelskoy (Russian: Геннадий Иванович Невельской; 5 December [O.S. 23 November] 1813 in Drakino, Soligalichsky Uyezd, Kostroma Governorate (Note: Now in Soligalichsky District, Kostroma Oblast.) – 29 April [O.S. 17 April] 1876 in St. Petersburg) was a Russian navigator and naval officer.

In 1829 he joined the Naval Cadet Corps and in 1846 was given the rank of captain lieutenant in the Russian Navy.

In 1848 Nevelskoy set out in command of what became the Amur Expedition of 1849-1855 to the area of the present-day Russian Far East, exploring Sakhalin and the outlet of the Amur River. He proved that the Strait of Tartary was not a gulf, but indeed a strait, connected to Amur's estuary by a narrow section (later called Nevelskoy Strait). On 13 August 1850 he founded Nikolayevsk-on-Amur, the first Russian settlement in the region.

Not knowing of the work of the Japanese navigator Mamiya Rinzō, who had explored the same area forty years earlier, the Russians took Nevelskoy's report as the first proof that Sakhalin is indeed an island. They renamed the Gulf of Tartary as the Strait of Tartary, and named the northernmost, narrowest section of the strait, the Strait of Nevelskoy, in the captain's honour. It connects the strait's main body (formerly known as the Gulf of Tartary) with the Amur Liman (Amur River estuary).

== Memory ==
The following entities are named after Nevelskoy:

- The Gulf and the Strait of the Far East, the city Nevelsk in the Sakhalin Oblast, a street in the city of Yuzhno-Sakhalinsk, Kholmsk (and in other cities of the Sah. area), Novosibirsk, village Wrangell Nakhodka and several other places.
- Monuments in Nikolaevsk-on-Amur, as the founder of the city.
- The passenger ship '(Project 860)' Amur River Shipping Company.
- A cruiser was to be named Admiral Nevelskoy but was requisitioned by the Imperial German Navy.
- The G.I. Nevelskoi Maritime State University in Vladivostok was named in his honour, as was its forty-foot-long (12-metre) expedition yacht Admiral Nevelskoi.
- The monument to Gennady Ivanovich Nevelskoy was opened in 1891 in Vladivostok, its creators were the sculptor Bach and the engineer of the fleet Antipenko. It was accepted for state protection in 1974, and in 2019 the boundaries of the object of cultural heritage of regional significance were determined.
- The Nevelskoi Nautical School, Kholmsk.
- Planes of the Russian airline Aeroflot
- Since 2007, the Ivanovo-Voznesensk sea cadet corps has been named after Nevelskoy.
- The Ropucha-class landing ship Admiral Nevelskoy.

Memorials:

- Until the mid-1990s there was a monument of Nevelskoy in Khabarovsk. During the night of 17 to 18 May 1996 the monument in Central Park of Culture and Rest of Khabarovsk was destroyed by minors. The sculpture was dismantled for reconstruction and has not been restored.
- July 16, 2008, in the city of Irkutsk, on the wall of Holy Cross Church (wedding place Gennady Nevelskoi and Catherine Yelchaninova) was a memorial plaque. The idea belongs to the installation of Irkutsk poet and member of the Board of Navy veterans Irkutsk Gennady Haidee.
- The monument in the town of Korsakov Sakhalin Oblast. Opened in July 2013
