= Sakhalin Tunnel =

Coordinates: 49°45′N 142°50′E

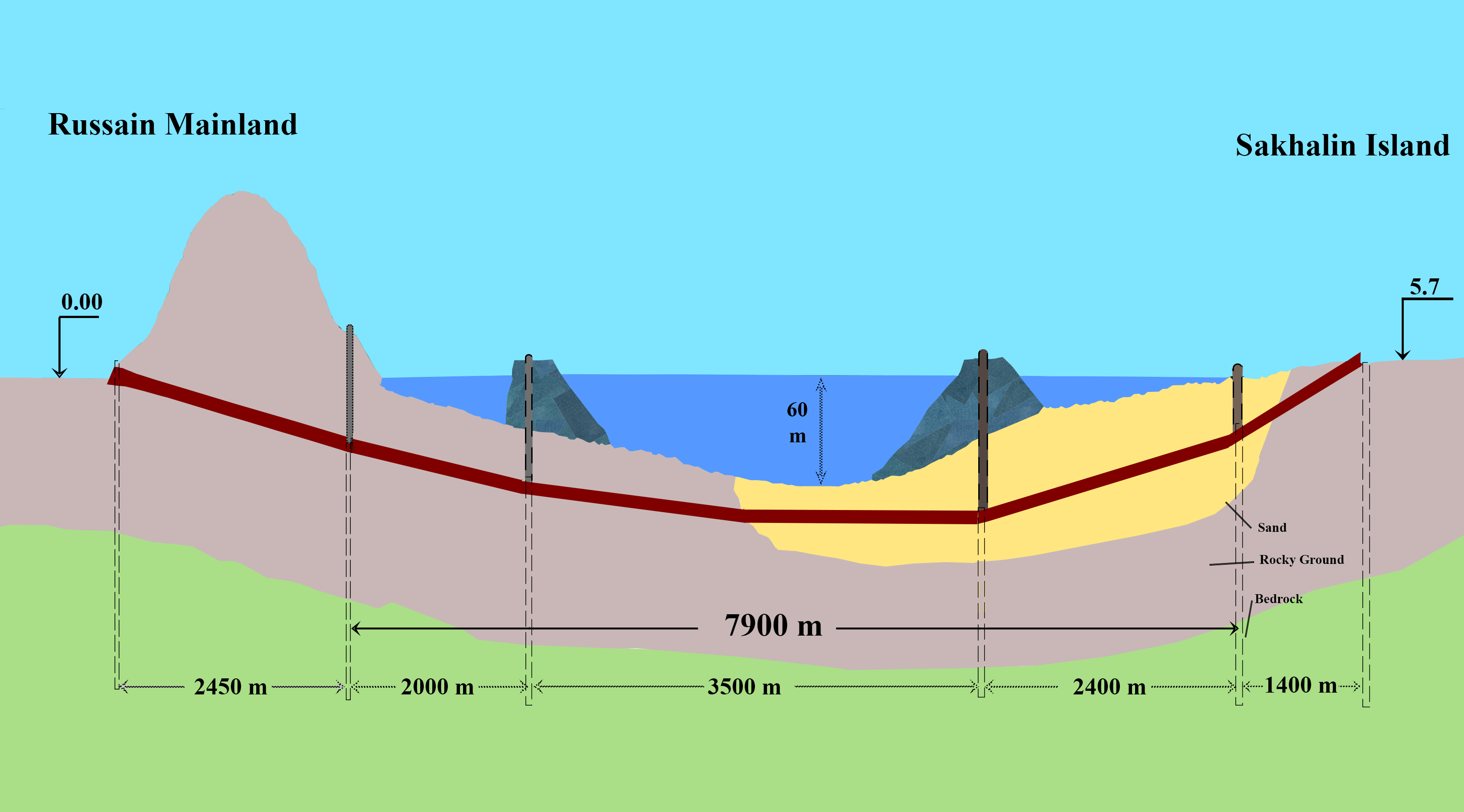
- Planned profile of the Sakhalin Tunnel

Overview
- Official name: Russian: Сахалинский тоннель Russian: Строительство № 507
- Line: Baikal-Amur Mainline and Sakhalin Railway
- Location: Russia (Sakhalin Oblast, and Khabarovsk Krai)
- Status: Postpone project
- System: OAO RZhD
- Crosses: Nevelskoy Strait
- Start: Cape Lazarev
- End: Cape Pogibi

Operation
- Work began: September 6, 1950
- Traffic: Railway
- Character: freight

Technical
- Length: 11.750 km (7.301 mi)
- No. of tracks: single-track
- Track gauge: 1,520 mm (4 ft 11 27/32 in) (Russian gauge)
- Max elevation: 5.7 m (19 ft)
- Min elevation: −60 m (−200 ft)

Route map
- The Sakhalin Tunnel location

The Sakhalin Tunnel (Russian: Сахалинский тоннель) is an incomplete and currently indefinitely postponed construction project, which after completion would have connected the island of Sakhalin with mainland Russia via a tunnel of approximately 10 kilometres (6 mi) under the Nevelskoy Strait (the narrowest part of the Strait of Tartary).

The construction started under the late Stalinist rule to serve primarily military and settlements purposes, and was abandoned on May 26, 1953, soon after Stalin's death.

== History ==
=== Early proposals and planning ===
The concept of a tunnel under the Nevelskoy Strait has existed since the 19th century, although it was never seriously pursued due to economic reasons. Studies into the feasibility of the project were first undertaken by the Soviet Union in the late 1930s, although World War II made progress at this time impossible. Joseph Stalin later announced in 1950 his intention to build a railway link to Sakhalin, either via rail ferry, a causeway, or a tunnel. A decision to construct a tunnel was announced by the Soviet government on May 5, 1950, along with a rail ferry link to serve as a temporary solution. The project was intended primarily to serve a military purpose, allowing better connection between Sakhalin and the mainland for sections of the Red Army stationed on the island.

=== Construction ===
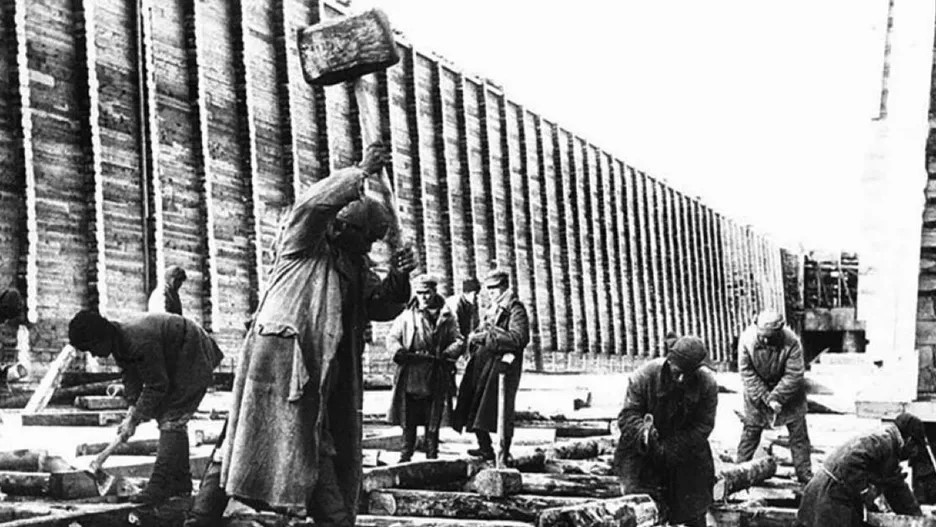
Sakhalin Tunnel route (ca. 1950)

The construction of the railway connection from Selikhino near Komsomolsk-on-Amur to the intended mainland tunnel portal at Cape Lazarev was assigned to the Soviet Ministry of Internal Affairs, with the Ministry of Transport in charge of the tunnel itself. In 1952, the project was transferred to the full management of the Ministry of Internal Affairs.

The planned route on Sakhalin was intended to run 327 kilometers (203 mi) from Cape Pogibi, where the tunnel should resurface, to the then northern terminus of the Sakhalin rail network at Pobedino (formerly known as "Koton" under Japanese rule), 10 kilometers (6 mi) north of Smirnykh. The length of the tunnel between Cape Pogibi and Cape Lazarev was planned to be around 10 kilometers (6 mi). On the mainland, a rail line was to be constructed to the railway connecting Komsomolsk-on-Amur with Sovetskaya Gavan, now a section of the Baikal-Amur Mainline.

The project was planned for completion by the end of 1953 and to be in full operation by the end of 1955. Annual goods traffic on the line was projected to reach four million tonnes.

The project included three separate constructions—mainland and island railway links, connecting with the rest of railroad network (Building 507 and 506 respectively) and tunnel itself (Building 6 of the MPS). Railway characteristics were very poor; in fact, it was a temporary railway, which was to be followed by capital rebuilding after construction.

Tunnel works (Building 6 of MPS) were a different story. It was to be constructed by military engineers and Metrostroy tunnel specialists.

After the death of Stalin in March 1953, work on the project stopped, with the tunnel allegedly almost halfway across the straits, although later investigation has shown that just two shafts were built. The shafts have a depth of about 55 metres (180 ft) and a diameter of about 9 metres (30 ft), with the trunk concreted and lined with cast-iron tubing, fastened to each other by bolts. While the reasons for cancellation of the project are not fully clear, some sources have indicated that because of numerous amnesties granted to prisoners after Stalin's death, there was no longer the required workforce. Tunnel workers waited eight months after cancellation, but without linking railways, the tunnel had no purpose.

== Completed sections of the project ==
Around 120 kilometres (75 miles) of track along the right bank of the Amur River from Selikhino to Chyorny Mys was completed, although this was still well short of the planned tunnel entrance at Cape Lazarev. The Selikhino-Chyorny Mys railway was later used for transport of lumber by the Soviet forestry industry, but was closed in the 1990s and the track has been largely dismantled.

Remains of the tunnel entrance are still visible around Cape Lazarev. No new track was built on Sakhalin, although preparatory earthworks on the planned route were used in the construction of a road from Nysh to Pogibi.

== Current operations and future prospects ==
Since 1973, a train ferry has connected Vanino (on the mainland near Sovetskaya Gavan) with the town of Kholmsk on Sakhalin.

Even after the dissolution of the Soviet Union, there have been calls from politicians for a revival of the project, although there have been concerns that its cost would outweigh the benefits. However, there have been signs that the link is under serious consideration, including an announcement of support from Russian president Dimitry Medvedev in November 2008. The project is proposed to be completed by 2030. On January 16, 2009, it was suggested by the Russian government the link could be completed with either a bridge or a tunnel.

New plans would see the connection in Sakhalin at Nogliki, which has in the meantime been connected to the island's rail network. In 2019, work was completed to convert the island's narrow-gauge rail system, a legacy of the previous Japanese administration of the southern half of the island, to the broader Russian standard gauge.

There have also been proposals to connect the southern tip of Sakhalin to the Japanese island of Hokkaido via a 40-kilometre-long (25 mi) Sakhalin–Hokkaido Tunnel or a bridge, providing a direct land transport link for container traffic from Japan to the Asian mainland and Europe.

=== Mainland-Sakhalin Bridge ===
In July 2018, Russia's president Vladimir Putin commissioned an analysis of a proposal to build a bridge from the Russian mainland to Sakhalin on the northernmost part of the Strait of Tartary. Putin said that the project was very important for Sakhalin residents and would be a major factor in encouraging people to remain in the region. It would also boost the development of Khabarovsk Krai. He said that he had instructed the government to analyze this matter, particularly its economic aspects.

In 2024 the plans were reaffirmed, with the nearest possible deadline of 2030. Experts criticize the project, pointing out that it can become feasible only within the context of the overall economic development of the area, as well as linking it with the projects to conect Sakhalin with Hokkaido by a tunnel or bridge.

== See also ==
- List of bridge–tunnels
- Sakhalin Railway
- Vanino–Kholmsk train ferry
