= Lazarev (urban-type settlement) =

Lazarev Ла́зарев
- Work settlement
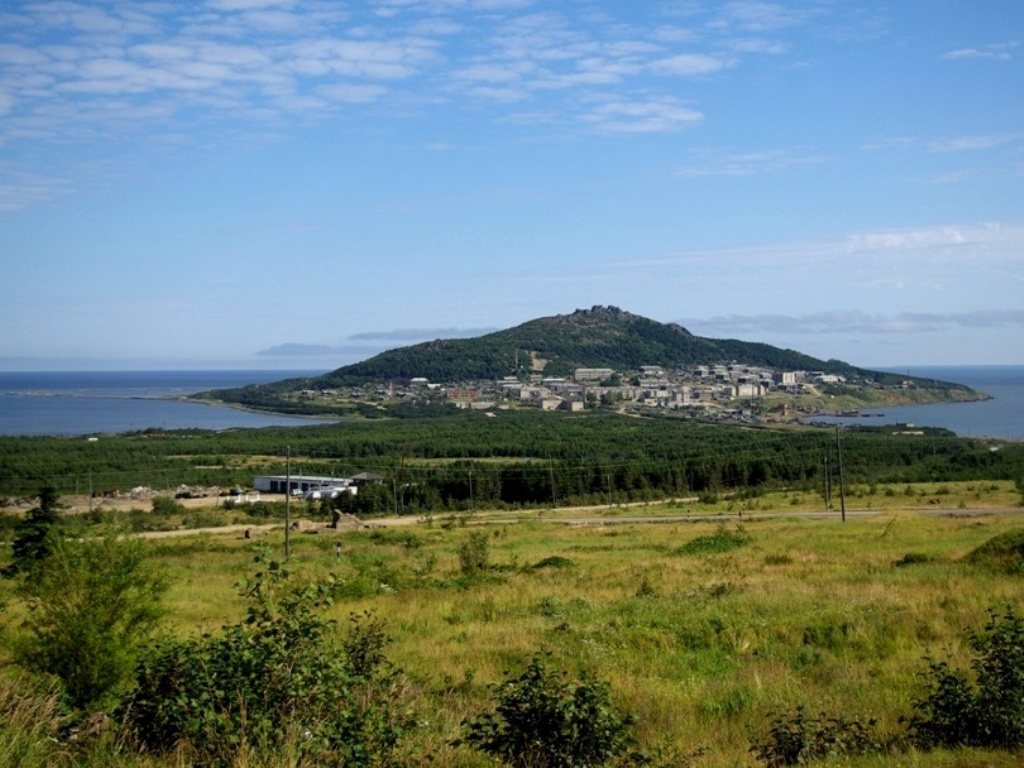
- Village of Lazarev
- Interactive map of Lazarev
- Location of Lazarev Lazarev (Khabarovsk Krai)
- Coordinates: 52°13′N 141°30′E
- Country: Russia
- Federal subject: Khabarovsk Krai
- Founded: 1849
- Urban-type settlement status since: 1952

Population (2010 Census)
  - Total: 1,307
  - Estimate (2002): 1,964 (+50.3%)
- Time zone: UTC+10 (MSK+7)
- Postal code: 682446
- OKTMO ID: 08631154051

Lazarev (Russian: Ла́зарев) is an urban-type settlement in the Nikolayevsky District of Khabarovsky Krai, Russia. In 2010 it had 1,307 inhabitants.

It is located on Cape Lazarev, on the mainland Russian coast of Nevelskoy Strait, 729 km north east of Komsomolsk-on-Amur. It is known for being the closest settlement on the Russian mainland to the island of Sakhalin, which is only 7.3 km across the strait from Cape Lazarev. It was also one of the end points for an unfinished tunnel to Sakhalin, constructed between the years 1950-53 by the Soviet Union under Joseph Stalin.

== History ==
The settlement had its beginnings in 1849 with the expedition of Gennady Nevelskoy, who founded the village of Mys Lazareva ("Cape Lazarev"). The cape and settlement were named for Russian admiral Mikhail Lazarev.

In 1950, construction began on the construction of a tunnel to Sakhalin, with Cape Lazarev to be the location of the western (mainland) portal. Construction was abandoned after Stalin's death in 1953, without any of the actual tunnel being dug. However, some construction shafts are still visible near the settlement.

The village received urban-type settlement status in 1952, at which point its name was shortened to simply "Lazarev".

== Economy ==
The town's two main employers are the timber and natural gas industries. There is a pumping station for gas and oil from Sakhalin. During the Soviet era, the town also had some fishing activity.
