= Chyorny Mys, Khabarovsk Krai =

Rural locality in Komsomolsky District, Khabarovsk Krai, Russia

Coordinates: 51°05′48″N 138°28′19″E

Chyorny Mys (Russian: Чёрный Мыс, lit. black cape) is a rural locality (a selo) in Komsomolsky District of Khabarovsk Krai, Russia. Population: 200 (2011 est.).

It is located on the right bank of the Amur River, about 120 kilometers (75 mi) downstream from Komsomolsk-on-Amur. It was the furthest operational point of a branch railway from Selikhino built in the early 1950s by the Soviet Union under Joseph Stalin, intended to link to a tunnel to the island of Sakhalin. Construction of the tunnel was abandoned after Stalin's death; however, the section as far as Chyorny Mys had been completed and was kept open for logging industry traffic until the 1990s.
