= Nevelskoy Strait =

- Пролив Невельско́го (Russian)
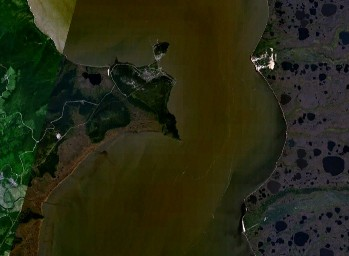
- A satellite image of the Nevelskoy Strait
- Interactive map of Nevelskoy Strait
- Location: Strait of Tartary
- Coordinates: 52.2°N 141.6°E
- Type: Strait
- Etymology: Gennady Nevelskoy
- Part of: Strait of Tartary
- Basin countries: Russia
- Max. length: 56 km (35 mi)
- Min. width: 7.3 km (4.5 mi)
- Average depth: 7.2 mi (11.6 km)
- Settlements: Lazarev, Khabarovsk Krai; Pogibi, Sakhalin Oblast

The Nevelskoy Strait (Russian: Пролив Невельско́го, romanized: Proliv Nevelskogo) is a strait within the Strait of Tartary located at the narrowest point between Sakhalin and the Asian mainland. The Nevelskoy Strait is administratively part of Russia on the border between Khabarovsk Krai and Sakhalin Oblast in the Russian Far East region.

== Geography ==
The Nevelskoy Strait is a "strait within a strait" in the Strait of Tartary, which connects the Sea of Japan and the Sea of Okhotsk between the island of Sakhalin and the Asian mainland in Northeast Asia. The Nevelskoy Strait connects the southern main body of the Strait of Tartary with the northern Amur Liman, the estuary of the Amur River. The Nevelskoy Strait is formed by the narrowest point between Sakhalian and the Asian mainland, and features a number of small capes and bays. Cape Lazarev, the largest cape, forms the narrow-most section of the Nevelskoy Strait as it projects towards Cape Pogibi.

Politically, the Nevelskoy Strait is territory of Russia, in the Russian Far East region on the border between the Russian federal subjects of Khabarovsk Krai and Sakhalin Oblast. The Nevelskoy Strait region is sparsely populated with Pogibi and Lazarev as the only significant settlements, located on the opposite sides of the strait at Cape Lazarev.

- Length: 56 km
- Width (narrowest): 7.3 km
- Fairway depth: 7.2 m

== History ==
The Nevelskoy Strait was named in honor of Captain Gennady Nevelskoy, an early Russian explorer of the Russian Far East and founder of Nikolayevsk-on-Amur, the first Russian settlement in the region. In 1849, Nevelskoy had definitively established that the Strait of Tartary is connected with the Amur estuary, and thus is in fact a strait, and not a bay. Nevelskoy was also unknowingly the third outlander to prove Sakhalin was an island and not connected to the Asian mainland.

The Nevelskoy Strait's strategic location has made it the subject of numerous proposed projects connecting Sakhalin and the mainland. The Soviet Union began construction of the Sakhalin Tunnel under the strait in 1950, which continued until the death of Joseph Stalin in 1953, when the works were postponed then effectively abandoned. In July 2018, Russia's president Vladimir Putin commissioned an analysis of a proposal to build a bridge to Sakhalin. Putin said that the project is very important for Sakhalin's residents and would be a major factor in encouraging people to remain in the region and also boost the development of neighboring Khabarovsk Krai. Putin said that he has instructed the government to analyse this matter, particularly its economic aspects.

== See also ==
- Pacific Coast of Russia
