= Sakhalin–Hokkaido Tunnel =

Proposed tunnel between Russia and Japan

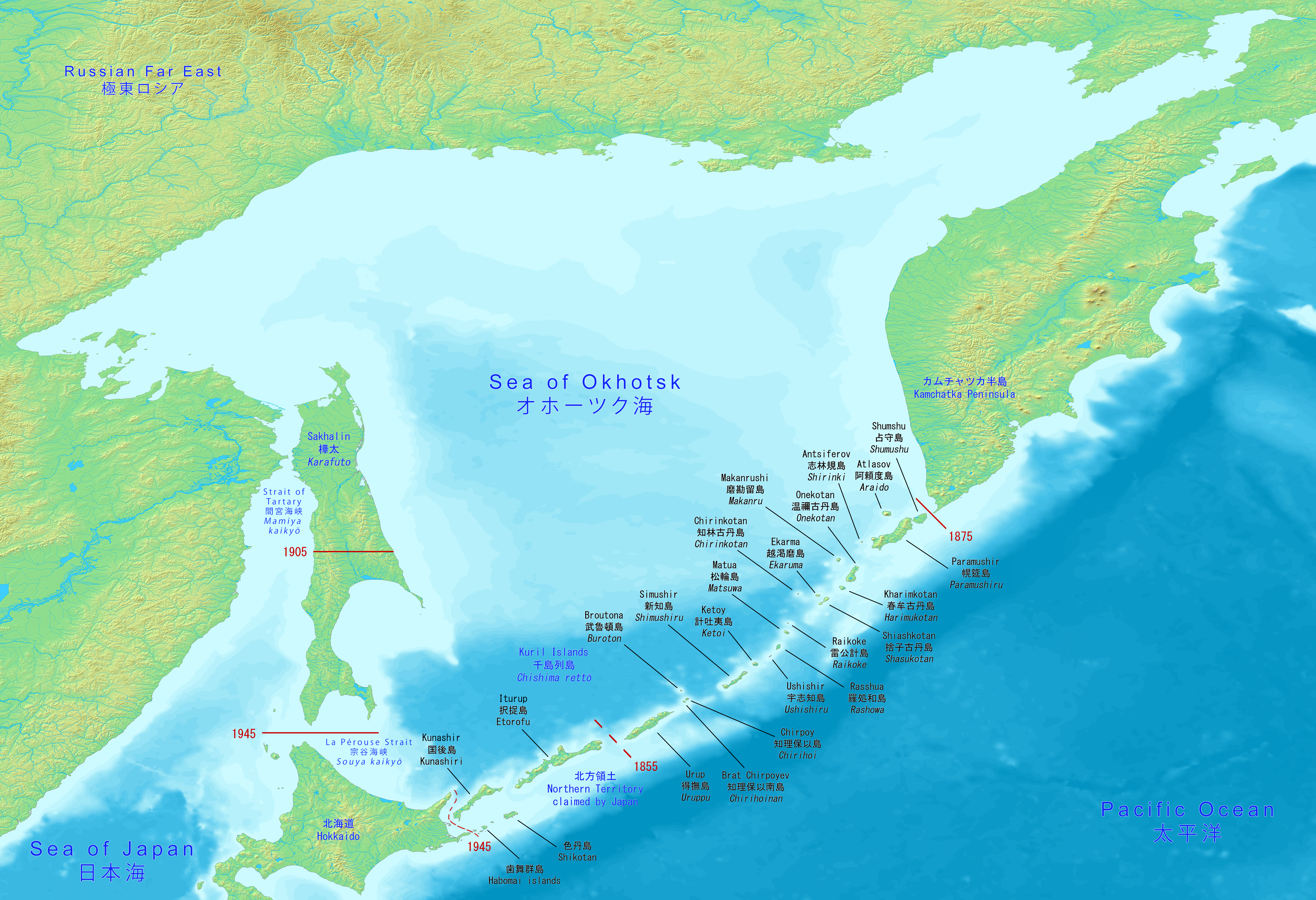
Sakhalin-Hokkaido border over the history

The Sakhalin–Hokkaido Tunnel is a proposed tunnel (or potentially bridge) connection to link the Russian island of Sakhalin with the Japanese island of Hokkaido through the Russia-Japan border. Cost estimates by Russia in the year 2000 put the project at $50 billion and that would span across the Soya strait for 45 kilometres (28 miles). If built as a bridge, it would have been the longest bridge in the world at the time.

== Overview ==
On 16 January 2009, the Russian Vice-Minister of Transport, Andrei Nedosekov, confirmed that proposals are now under consideration in regard to the Sakhalin–Hokkaido Tunnel. The proposal was for a bridge rather than a tunnel. His decision to invite Japanese companies to bid to become consortium members of a wide array of Russian rail infrastructure work, particularly the Sakhalin Tunnel (or bridge) to the Russian mainland could be taken as a nod towards future rail cooperation between Russia and Japan.

The tunnel would span roughly 40–45 kilometres (25–28 mi) between Sakhalin (in Russia) and Hokkaido (in Japan) under the Soya Strait. In comparison, the completed 53.85 km (33.46 mi) Seikan Tunnel links the Japanese islands of Honshu and Hokkaido.

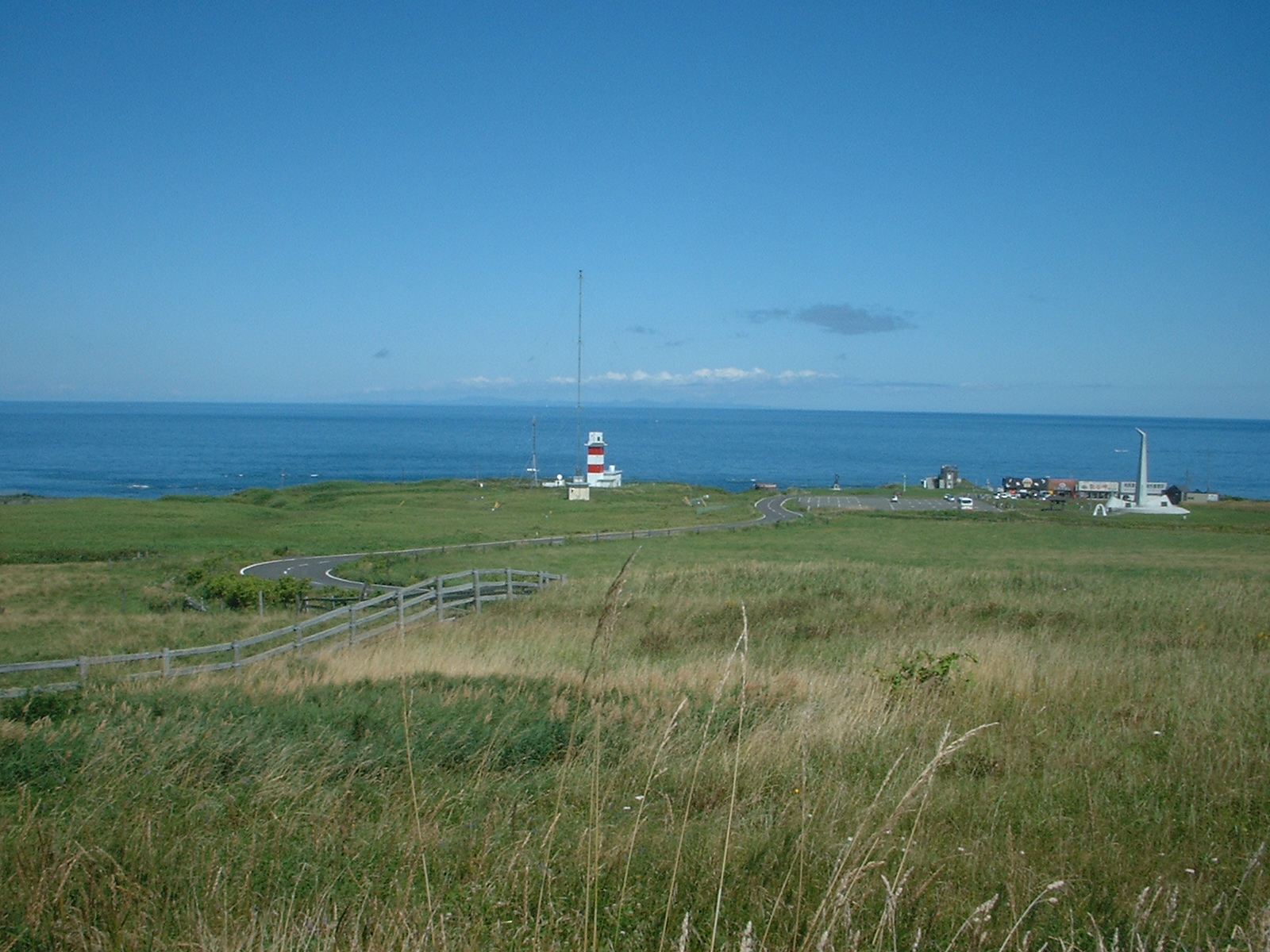
Soya Strait

A further tunnel or bridge in the north of Sakhalin to the Russian mainland would also have to be created. Already a proposal for the Sakhalin Tunnel, has been announced by the Russian Government. Once on the Russian mainland, the rail link could connect to the rest of the Russian (and hence European) rail network, allowing for gauge changes. Running south, from Hokkaido, the line would connect with the Seikan Tunnel between Hokkaido and Honshu, currently the longest undersea tunnel in the world and second-longest railway tunnel. This would allow connections to the rest of the Japanese rail network.

The project could be seen as an alternative to the Japan–Korea Undersea Tunnel, as Russia is already under way with planning and construction of many of the necessary linkages on the Russian side, whereas the tunnel itself would be considerably shorter than that between Japan and Korea.

As well as the great cost and engineering difficulty, there may be political problems, particularly in regard to the Kuril Islands dispute between Russia and Japan. The Japanese government's initial reaction has been positive towards the idea.

Russian officials again raised the idea of a bridge or tunnel to connect Sakhalin with Hokkaido in 2013.

Former Japanese Prime Minister Shinzo Abe expressed a desire to resolve the longstanding dispute that has prevented Japan and Russia from finalising a peace agreement since World War II. A proposed road connection between Russia and Japan could integrate with Russia's Trans-Siberian Railway, linking Moscow and Europe to the northeastern edge of the Eurasian continent.

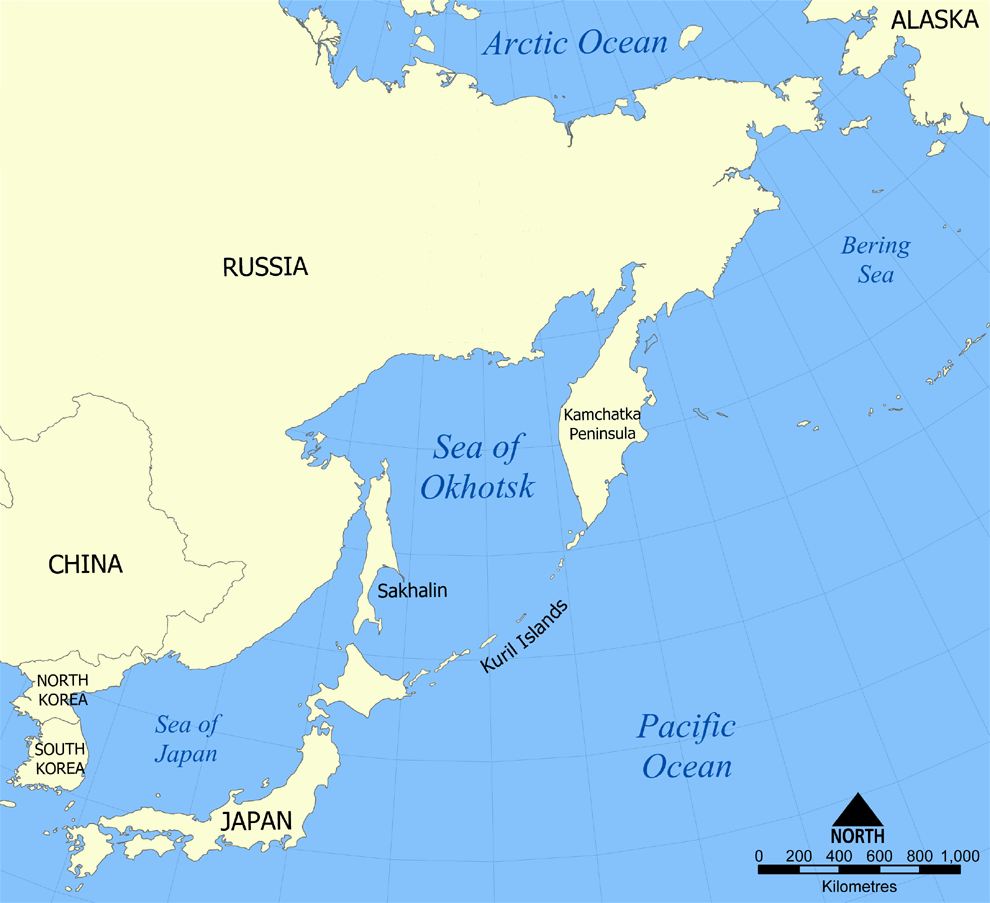

The Sakhalin connection has been a "longtime goal" for the Kremlin, according to Sergei Ivanov, though progress has been minimal. "Even comrade Joseph Stalin had plans for this, but it never materialised. In the Soviet Union, many initiatives failed to come to fruition—take the Chita-Khabarovsk road, for instance—but we succeeded with that one." Ivanov did not specify a timeline for constructing a potential tunnel to Sakhalin, suggesting that inquiries on the matter be directed to the Ministry of Transport.

The project has repeatedly come up in discussions between officials from Russia and Japan. During Russian President Vladimir Putin's first term in office, the Kremlin greatly intensified its outreach to Japan, the world's third biggest economy. Russia's plan was to build a 28-mile (45 km) bridge between the two countries that could link Moscow to Tokyo by land and rail. Putin reignited speculation about the long-rumored project in 2017, when he announced that a land link between Russia and Japan would have “planetary” significance.

In July 2018, Russia's president Vladimir Putin commissioned an analysis of a proposal to build a bridge to Sakhalin Island. Putin said that the project is very important for Sakhalin residents and would be a major factor in encouraging people to remain in the region. It would also boost the development of Khabarovsk Territory. He said that he has instructed the government to analyse this matter, particularly its economic aspects.

== Gauges ==

The railways on the Russian mainland use the 1,520 mm (4 ft 11 27/32 in) Russian gauge, while the Sakhalin Railway was by 2019 converted from the original Japanese 1,067 mm (3 ft 6 in) gauge (Cape gauge) to the Russian gauge. Japanese railways use 1,067 mm (3 ft 6 in) (legacy lines and freight traffic) and 1,435 mm (4 ft 8 1/2 in) standard gauge (mostly Shinkansen). If the tunnel were built with 1,520 mm (4 ft 11 27/32 in), there would be one break of gauge for all traffic on the Japanese side. If it were built with 1,435 mm (4 ft 8 1/2 in) only, there would be twice a break of gauge for freight traffic. It is unclear what gauge would be used for the proposed tunnel and associated infrastructure. Here are the current proposed figures:

- Breaks of gauge: in Wakkanai area, Hokkaido, 1,520 mm (4 ft 11 27/32 in)/1,435 mm (4 ft 8 1/2 in).
- Sakhalin–Hokkaido Tunnel
  - Track gauge: 1,520 mm (4 ft 11 27/32 in)
  - Loading gauge: 4.1 metres (13 ft) wide and 6.15 metres (20.2 ft) tall
  - Electrification: 25 kV 50 Hz AC overhead lines
- Hokkaido network:
  - Track gauge: 1,435 mm (4 ft 8 1/2 in)
  - Loading gauge: Japanese Shinkansen

== See also ==
- Japan-Russia Border
- Trans Global Highway
- List of bridge–tunnels
