= Nysh =

Human settlement in Russia

Coordinates: 51°32′08″N 142°45′13″E

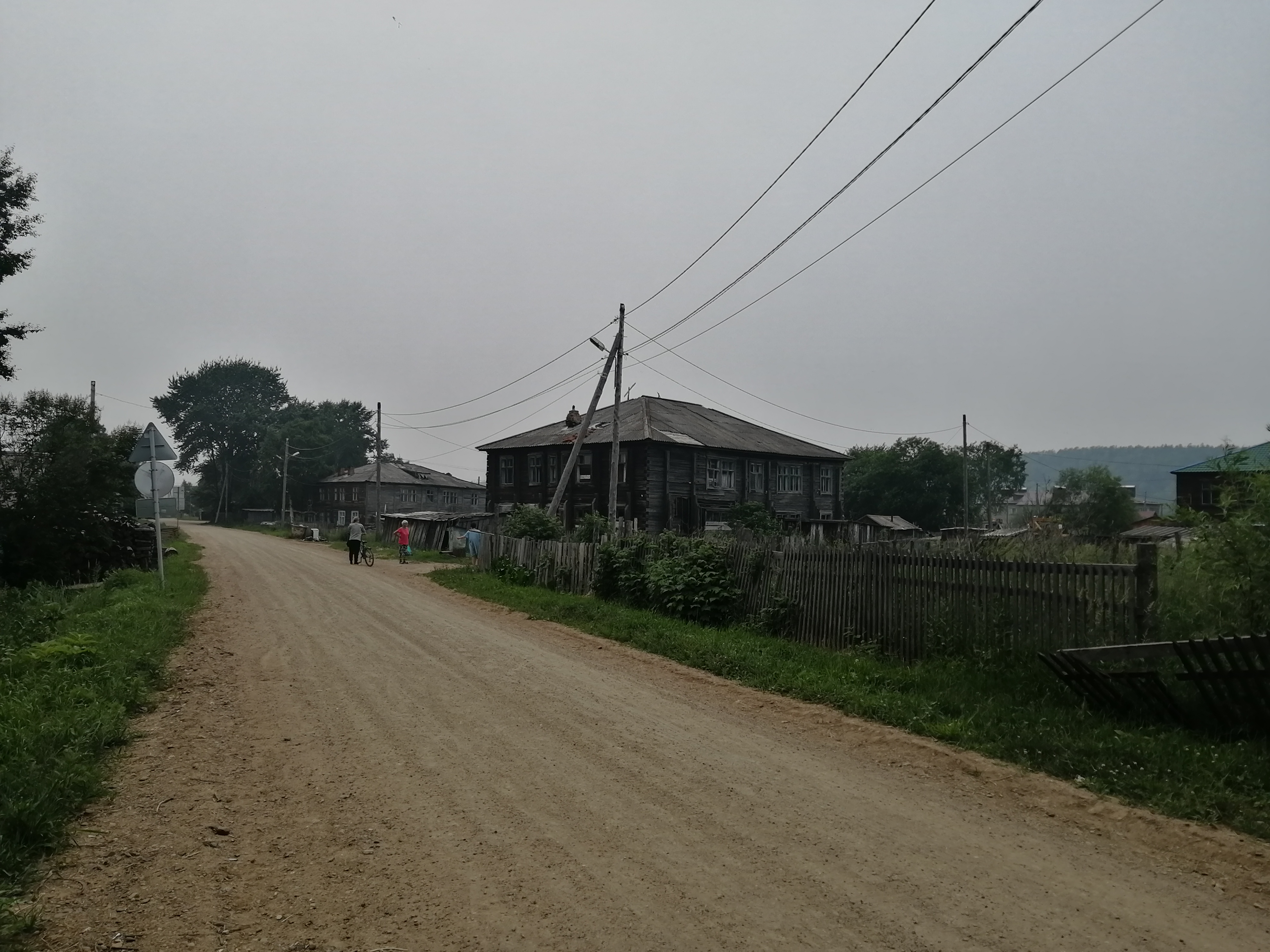

Nysh (Russian: Ныш) is a rural locality (a selo) in Nogliksky District of Sakhalin Oblast, Russia, located on the Tym River, 40 kilometers (25 mi) south of Nogliki.

== Transportation ==
If the rail link between Sakhalin and the mainland is built as planned, Nysh is to be the junction for the new railway with the island's existing network.
