= Amur Liman =

Liman of Amur River in Russia

Coordinates: 52°54′N 141°30′E

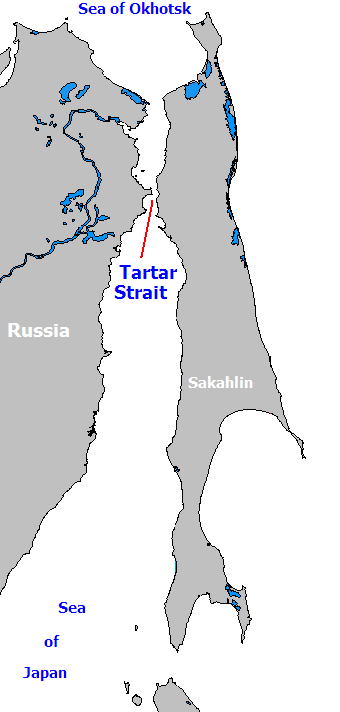
The Strait of Tartary connects the Sea of Okhostsk to the Sea of Japan.

The Amur Liman (Russian: Амурский лиман, romanized: Amurskiy liman) is a liman of the Amur River, the northern part of the Strait of Tartary between Eurasia and Sakhalin. It connects the Sakhalin Gulf of the Sea of Okhotsk with the main body of the Strait of Tartary via the Nevelskoy Strait.

"Amur Liman" is often translated as "Amur Estuary" or "Amur Mouth".
