= Chekhov, Sakhalin Oblast =

Chekhov Чехов
- Selo
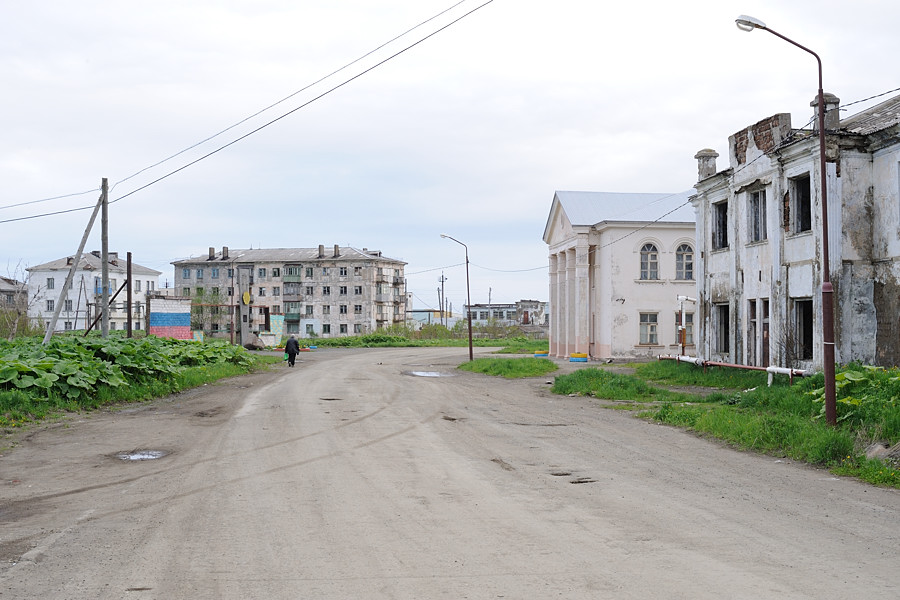
- At street in Chekhov
- Interactive map of Chekhov
- Location of Chekhov Chekhov (Sakhalin Oblast)
- Coordinates: 47°26′N 141°59′E
- Country: Russia
- Federal subject: Sakhalin Oblast
- Administrative district: Kholmsky District

Population (2010 Census)
  - Total: 3,389
  - Estimate (2021): 2,305
- Time zone: UTC+11 (MSK+8)
- Postal code: 694670
- Dialing code: +7 42433
- OKTMO ID: 64754000151

Chekhov (Russian: Че́хов) is a rural locality (a selo) in Kholmsky District of Sakhalin Oblast, Russia, located at the Strait of Tartary. Population: 3,389 (2010 census); 4,944 (2002 census); 7,901 (1989 Soviet census).

== History ==
Under Japanese rule, it was known as Noda (野田) (Но́да). After the Soviet Union took control of the whole of Sakhalin island after World War II, it was granted town status and renamed Chekhov (after the Russian writer Anton Chekhov) in 1947. It was demoted in status to that of a rural locality in 2004.
