= Strait of Tartary =

Strait dividing Sakhalin from mainland Asia

Coordinates: 52°11′00″N 141°37′00″E

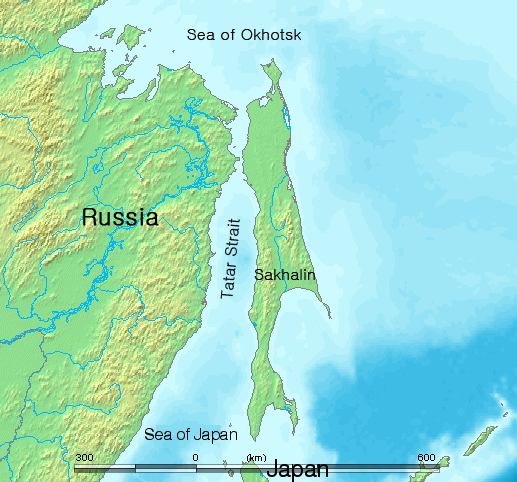
The Strait of Tartary (also known as Tatar Strait) connects the Sea of Okhotsk to the Sea of Japan.

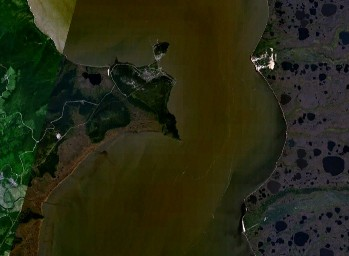
Satellite image of the Strait of Tartary

The Strait of Tartary (Russian: Татарский пролив; Chinese: 韃靼海峽; pinyin: Dádá hǎixiá; Korean: 타타르 해협), Gulf of Tartary, or Mamiya Strait (Japanese: 間宮海峡, romanized: Mamiya kaikyō) is a strait in the Pacific Ocean dividing the Russian island of Sakhalin from mainland Asia (South-East Russia), connecting the Sea of Okhotsk (Nevelskoy Strait) on the north with the Sea of Japan on the south. It is 632 km (393 mi) long, 7–23 km (4.3–14.3 mi) wide, and only 4 m (13 ft) deep at its shallowest point.

== History ==
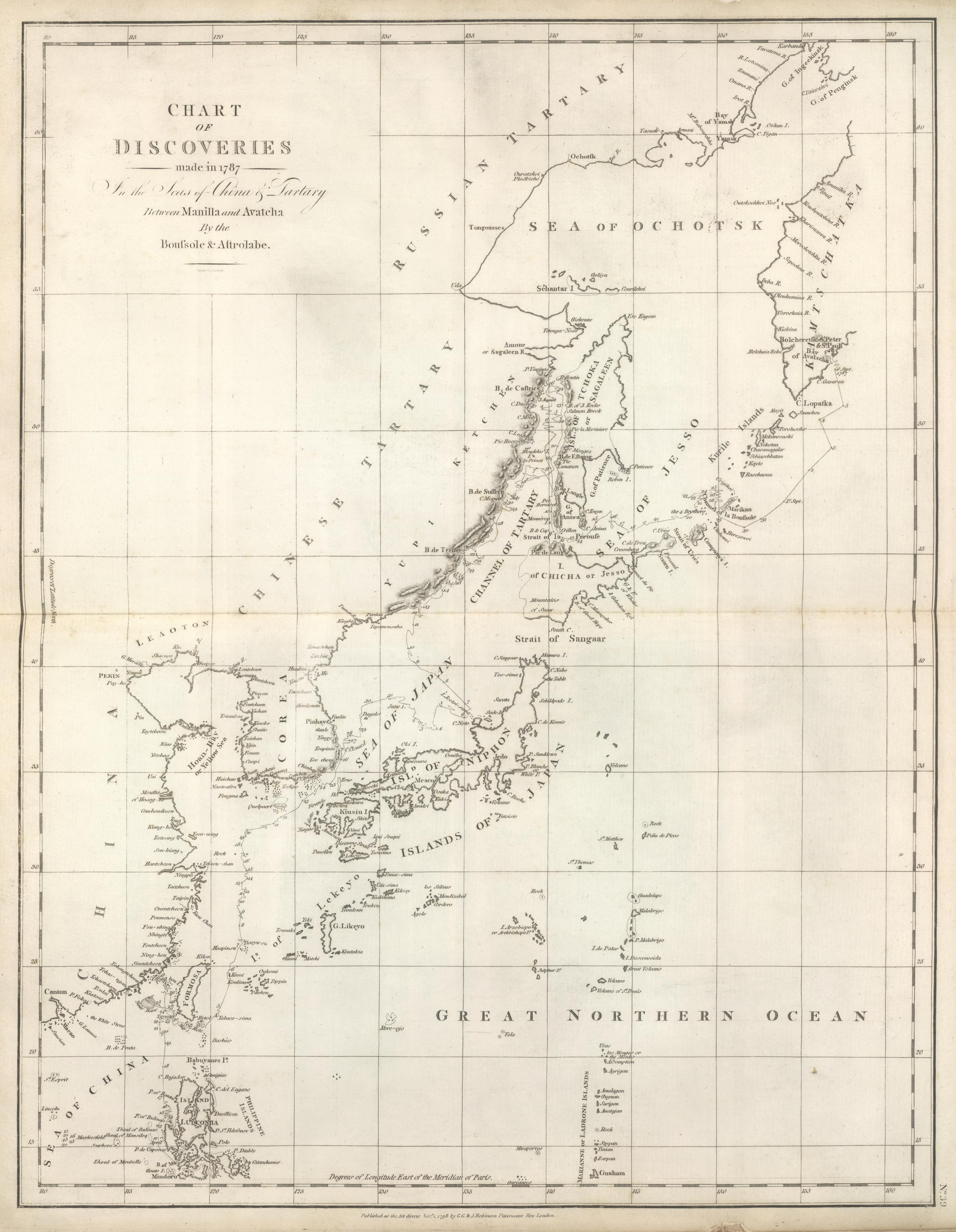
The coasts of the "Channel of Tartary" were charted by La Pérouse in 1787. The land adjacent to it from the west was referred to at the time as the "Chinese Tartary"

=== Yuan dynasty ===
During the Yuan dynasty, the Yuan armies crossed the strait in the Mongol invasions of Sakhalin. Alleged remnants of a Chinese fort dating back to the Mongol Yuan era can be found in Sakhalin today.

"Tartary" is an older name used by Europeans to refer to a vast region covering Inner Asia, Central Asia and North Asia. The toponym is derived from the medieval ethnonym Tartars, which was applied to various Turkic and Mongol semi-nomadic empires, including the Yuan dynasty that ruled over China and the straits of Northeast Asia.

=== Qing dynasty ===
During the destruction of the Ming dynasty and rise of the Qing dynasty in 1644, the name "Tartars" became applied to the Manchus as well, and Manchuria (and Mongolia) became known to the Europeans as the "Chinese Tartary". Accordingly, when La Pérouse charted most of the strait between Sakhalin and the mainland "Chinese Tartary" in 1787, the body of water received the name of the Strait (or Channel, or Gulf) of Tartary.

In Japan, the strait is named after Mamiya Rinzō, who traveled to the strait in 1808 whereof the name was introduced by Philipp Franz von Siebold in his book Nippon: Archiv zur Beschreibung von Japan (1832–54).

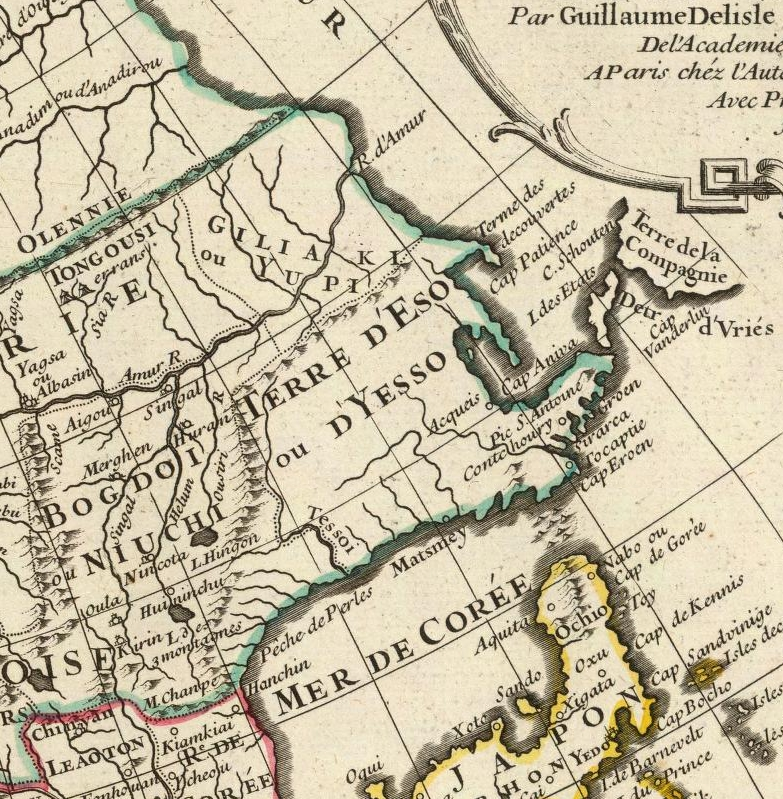
Early 18 c. French map depicting the Vries Strait and the Strait of Tartary.

On Russian maps, the short narrowest section of the strait (south of the mouth of the Amur) is called Nevelskoy Strait, after Admiral Gennady Nevelskoy, who explored the area in 1848; the body of water north of there, into which the Amur River flows, is the Amur Liman; and the name of "Strait of Tartary" is reserved for the largest section of the body of water, south of Nevelskoy Strait.

The Tartar Strait was a puzzle to European explorers since, when approached from the south, it becomes increasingly shallow and looks like the head of a bay. In 1787 La Perouse decided not to risk it and turned south even though locals had told him that Sakhalin was an island. In 1797 William Broughton also decided that the Gulf of Tartary was a bay and turned south. In 1805 Adam Johann von Krusenstern failed to penetrate the strait from the north. Mamiya Rinzō's journey of 1808 was little known to Europeans. Gennady Nevelskoy passed the strait from the north in 1848. The Russians kept this a secret and used it to evade a British fleet during the Crimean War.

=== Recent history ===
S-117 was a Soviet Shchuka class submarine that was lost on or about December 15, 1952, due to unknown causes in the Strait of Tartary in the Sea of Japan. The boat may have collided with a surface ship or struck a mine. All forty-seven crewmen died in the incident.

The southeastern part of the Strait of Tartary was the site of one of the tensest incidents of the Cold War, when on September 1, 1983, Korean Air Lines Flight 007, carrying 269 people including a sitting U.S. congressman, Larry McDonald, strayed into the Soviet air space and was attacked by a Soviet Su-15 interceptor just west of Sakhalin Island. The plane came down on the waters off the strait's only land mass, Moneron Island. An intensive naval search by the U.S. with assistance of Japanese and Korean vessels was carried on in a 225 square miles (580 km^{2}) area of the strait just north of Moneron Island.

== 1956 causeway proposal ==
In 1956 the Soviet government proposed that a causeway be built at the Tartar Strait to block cold water from flowing into the Sea of Japan therefore raising the temperature in areas around the Sea of Japan. The Russians claimed it would raise the temperature of the Sea of Japan by an average of 19.5 °C (67.1 °F).

== Transportation ==
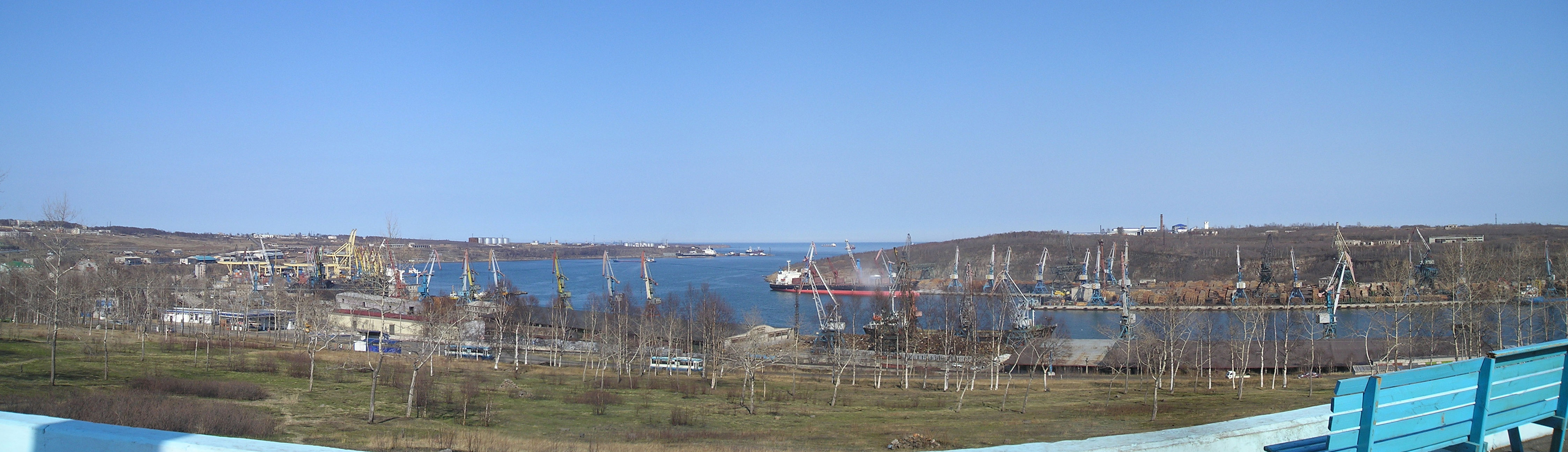
Vanino, here in early May 2008, is an important port on the Strait of Tartary

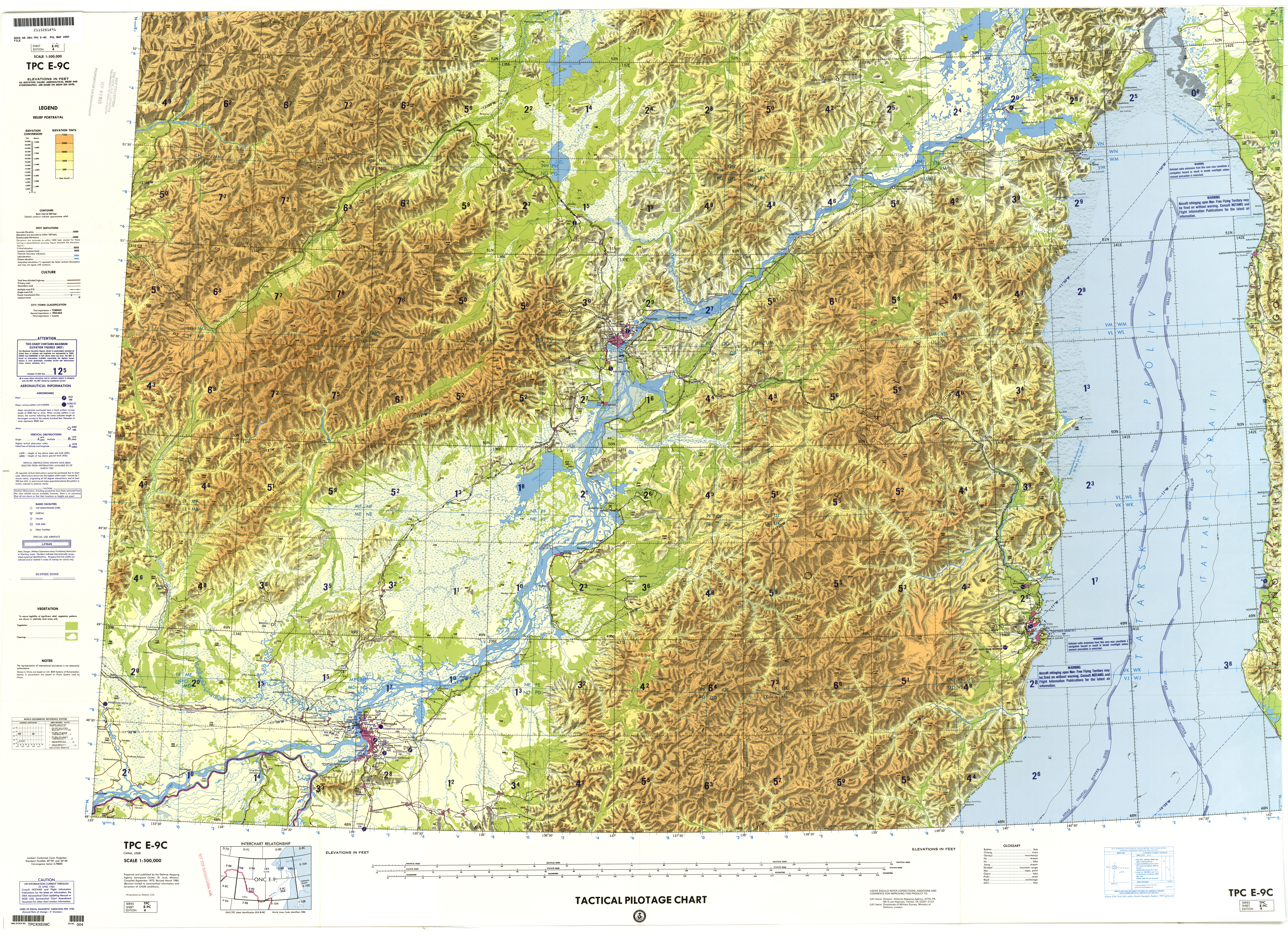
Map including the Tatar Strait

Since 1973, Vanino-Kholmsk train ferry operates across the strait, connecting the port of Vanino, Khabarovsk Krai on the mainland with Kholmsk on Sakhalin Island.

Looking at the map, one could think that the Strait of Tartary would provide a convenient connection for boats sailing from the Sea of Japan to the Sea of Okhotsk, e.g. from Vanino to Magadan. However, according to the SASCO that operates that shipping line, their ships rarely travel that way. The usual winter route from Vanino to Magadan is via Tsugaru Strait, and around Hokkaido; the usual summer route, is via La Pérouse Strait and around Sakhalin. Only when coming back from Magadan to Vanino with a low load and in good weather would the ships travel along the shortest route, i.e., via the Amur Liman, Nevelskoy Strait, and the Strait of Tartary proper (which SASCO calls the "Strait of Sakhalin" – Sakhalinsky Proliv).

A tunnel under the strait, to provide a road and/or rail connection between Sakhalin and the mainland, was begun under Joseph Stalin, but abandoned incomplete after his death. Renewed calls for either a tunnel or a bridge have been made by politicians in recent years.

== See also ==
- Korean Air Lines Flight 007
