= Komsomolsky District, Khabarovsk Krai =

Komsomolsky District Комсомольский район (Russian)
- District
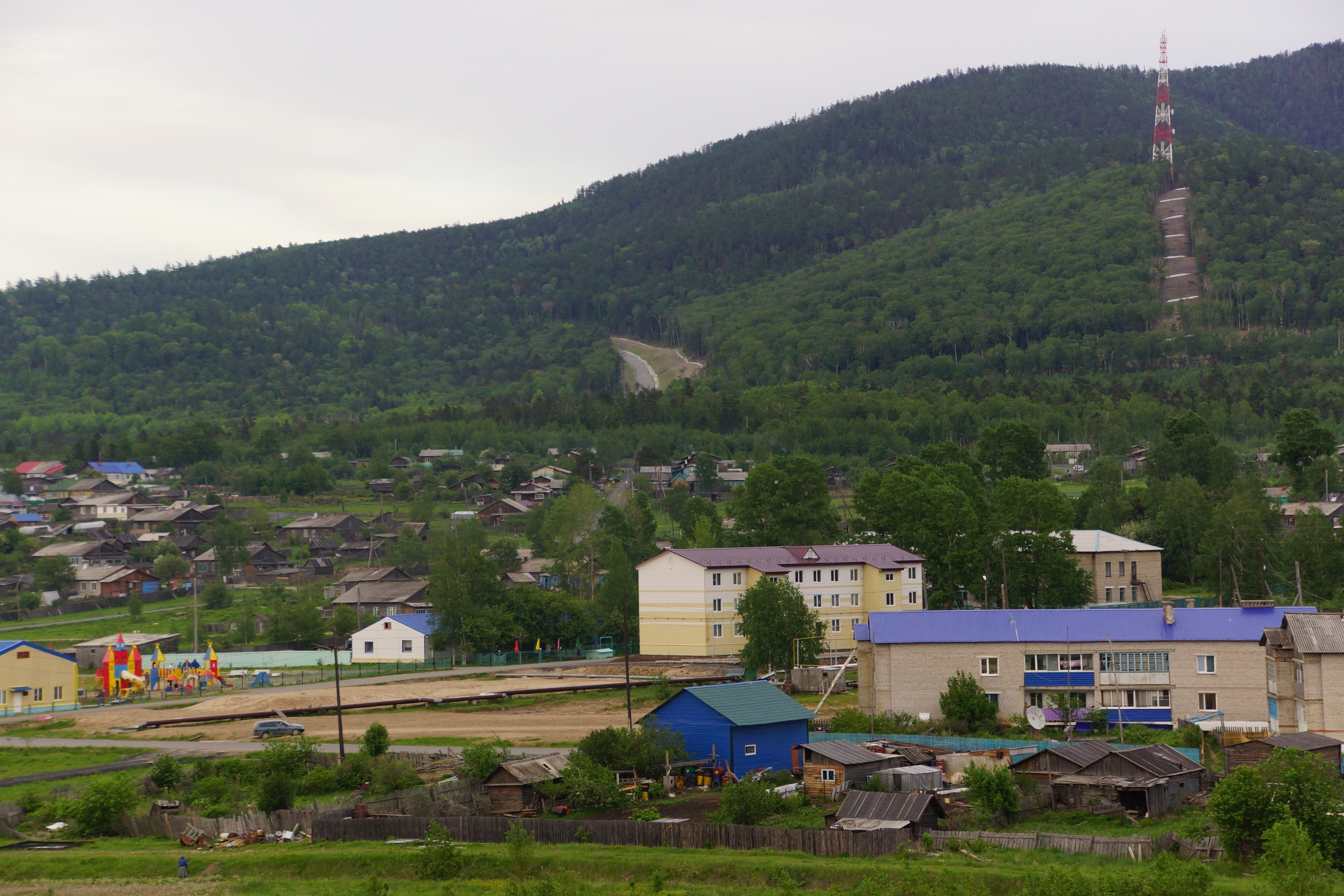
- Settlement of Yagodny in Komsomolsky District

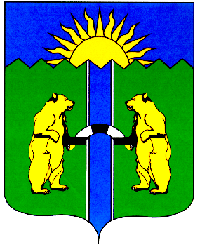
- Flag Coat of arms
- Location of Komsomolsky District in Khabarovsk Krai
- Coordinates: 50°34′N 137°00′E
- Country: Russia
- Federal subject: Khabarovsk Krai
- Established: 4 January 1926
- Administrative center: Komsomolsk-on-Amur

Area
  - Total: 25,167 km^{2} (9,717 sq mi)

Population (2010 Census)
  - Total: 29,072
  - Density: 1.1552/km^{2} (2.9919/sq mi)
  - Urban: 2.7%
  - Rural: 97.3%

Administrative structure
  - Inhabited localities: 35 rural localities

Municipal structure
  - Municipally incorporated as: Komsomolsky Municipal District
  - Municipal divisions: 0 urban settlements, 21 rural settlements
- Time zone: UTC+10 (MSK+7)
- OKTMO ID: 08620000
- Website: https://www.raion-kms.ru/

Komsomolsky District (Russian: Комсомо́льский райо́н) is an administrative and municipal district (raion), one of the seventeen in Khabarovsk Krai, Russia. It is located in the southern central part of the krai. The area of the district is 25,167 square kilometers (9,717 sq mi). Its administrative center is the city of Komsomolsk-on-Amur (which is not administratively a part of the district). Population: 29,072 (2010 census); 31,563 (2002 census); 33,649 (1989 Soviet census).

== Geography ==
The Amur river flows by the city. Lake Khummi is located 32 km (20 mi) to the southeast of the city.

== Administrative and municipal status ==
Within the framework of administrative divisions, Komsomolsky District is one of the seventeen in the krai. The city of Komsomolsk-on-Amur serves as its administrative center, despite being incorporated separately as a city of krai significance—an administrative unit with the status equal to that of the districts.

As a municipal division, the district is incorporated as Komsomolsky Municipal District. The city of krai significance of Komsomolsk-on-Amur is incorporated separately from the district as Komsomolsk-na-Amure Urban Okrug.
