= Administrative divisions of Khabarovsk Krai =

Khabarovsk Krai Russia
- Administrative center: Khabarovsk

Administrative structure (as of 2013)
- Districts: 17
- Cities/towns: 7
- Urban-type settlements: 18
- Selsovets: 0

Municipal structure (as of 2002)
- Rural settlements: 431 (inhabited); 10 (uninhabited)

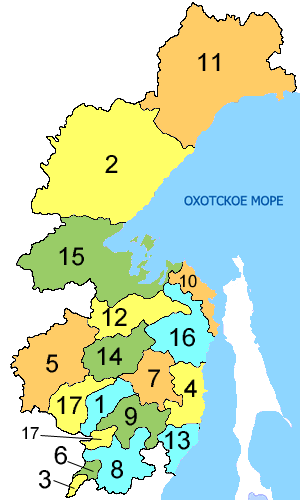
Subdivisional map of Khabarovsk Krai Districts: 1. Amursky, 2. Ayano-Maysky, 3. Bikinsky, 4. Vaninsky, 5. Verkhnebureinsky, 6. Vyazemsky, 7. Komsomolsky, 8. Lazovsky, 9. Nanaisky, 10. Nikolaevsky, 11. Okhotsky, 12. Imeni Poliny Osipenko, 13. Sovetsko Gavansky, 14. Solnechny, 15. Tuguro-Chumikansky, 16. Ulchsky, 17. Khabarovsky.

Khabarovsk Krai is a federal subject of Russia.

== Administrative and municipal divisions ==
Map

Division		Structure		OKATO	OKTMO	Urban-type settlement/ district-level town*
Division		Administrative	Municipal	OKATO	OKTMO	Urban-type settlement/ district-level town*
Khabarovsk (Хабаровск)		city	urban okrug	08 401	08 701	
↳	Industrialny (Индустриальный)	(under Khabarovsk)	—N/a	08 401	—N/a	
↳	Kirovsky (Кировский)	(under Khabarovsk)	—N/a	08 401	—N/a	
↳	Krasnoflotsky (Краснофлотский)	(under Khabarovsk)	—N/a	08 401	—N/a	
↳	Tsentralny (Центральный)	(under Khabarovsk)	—N/a	08 401	—N/a	
↳	Zheleznodorozhny (Железнодорожный)	(under Khabarovsk)	—N/a	08 401	—N/a	
Amursk (Амурск)		city	(under Amursky)	08 403	08 603	
Bikin (Бикин)		city	(under Bikinsky)	08 406	08 609	
Komsomolsk-on-Amur (Комсомольск-на-Амуре)		city	urban okrug	08 409	08 709	
Nikolayevsk-on-Amur (Николаевск-на-Амуре)		city	(under Nikolayevsky)	08 414	08 631	
Sovetskaya Gavan (Советская Гавань)		city	(under Sovetsko-Gavansky)	08 418	08 642	
Amursky (Амурский)		district		08 203	08 603	Elban (Эльбан)
Ayano-Maysky (Аяно-Майский)		district		08 206	08 606	
Bikinsky (Бикинский)		district		08 209	08 609	
Vaninsky (Ванинский)		district		08 212	08 612	Oktyabrsky (Октябрьский); Vanino (Ванино); Vysokogorny (Высокогорный)
Verkhnebureinsky (Верхнебуреинский)		district		08 214	08 614	Chegdomyn (Чегдомын); Novy Urgal (Новый Ургал)
Vyazemsky (Вяземский)		district		08 217	08 617	Vyazemsky (Вяземский) town*
Komsomolsky (Комсомольский)		district		08 220	08 620	
imeni Lazo (имени Лазо)		district		08 224	08 624	Khor (Хор); Mukhen (Мухен); Pereyaslavka (Переяславка)
Nanaysky (Нанайский)		district		08 228	08 628	
Nikolayevsky (Николаевский)		district		08 231	08 631	Lazarev (Лазарев); Mnogovershinny (Многовершинный)
Okhotsky (Охотский)		district		08 234	08 634	Okhotsk (Охотск)
imeni Poliny Osipenko (имени Полины Осипенко)		district		08 237	08 637	
Sovetsko-Gavansky (Советско-Гаванский)		district		08 242	08 642	Lososina (Лососина); Maysky (Майский); Zavety Ilyicha (Заветы Ильича)
Solnechny (Солнечный)		district		08 244	08 644	Gorny (Горный); Solnechny (Солнечный)
Tuguro-Chumikansky (Тугуро-Чумиканский)		district		08 246	08 646	
Ulchsky (Ульчский)		district		08 250	08 650	
Khabarovsky (Хабаровский)		district		08 255	08 655	Korfovsky (Корфовский)
