= Flag of Khabarovsk Krai =

Flag of the Russian krai of Khabarovsk

Khabarovsk Krai
- Proportion: 2:3
- Adopted: 14 July 1994
- Design: A horizontal white and light blue with a green triangle.
- Designed by: S. N. Loginov

The flag of Khabarovsk Krai, in the Russian Federation, is a horizontal white and light blue bicolour charged with a green triangle at the hoist side in a similar fashion to the flag of the Czech Republic, albeit with different colors. It was adopted on 14 July 1994. The proportions are 2:3.

== Flags ==
=== Historical flags ===
Flag	Date	Use	Description
	1917–1922	Flag of the Ukrainian Far Eastern Republic in Siberia	horizontal light blue and yellow bicolour charged with a green triangle at the hoist side
	1924–1925	Flag of the Tungus Republic	

=== Other flags ===
Flag	Date	Use	Description
	?–present	Flag of Khabarovsk city	
	2006–present	Flag of Amursk	
	?–2006	Flag of Amursk	
	?–present	Flag of Komsomolsk-on-Amur	
	?–present	Flag of Nikolayevsk-on-Amur	
	?–?	Flag of Nikolayevsk-on-Amur	
	?–present	Flag of Sovetskaya Gavan	
	?–present	Flag of Amursky District	
	?–present	Flag of Ayano-Maysky District	
	?–present	Flag of Bikinsky District	
	?–present	Flag of Vaninsky District	
	2006–present	Flag of Verkhnebureinsky District	
	?–2006	Flag of Verkhnebureinsky District	
	?–present	Flag of Vyazemsky District	
	?–present	Flag of Komsomolsky District	
	?–present	Flag of Imeni Lazo District	
	?–present	Flag of Nanaysky District	
	?–present	Flag of Nikolayevsky District	
	?–present	Flag of Okhotsky District	
	?–present	Flag of Imeni Poliny Osipenko District	
	?–present	Flag of Sovetsko-Gavansky District	
	?–present	Flag of Solnechny District	
	?–present	Flag of Tuguro-Chumikansky District	
	?–present	Flag of Khabarovsky District	
