= Zavety Ilyicha =

Zavety Ilyicha (Russian: Заве́ты Ильича́) is the name of several inhabited localities in Russia.

== Urban localities ==
- Zavety Ilyicha, Khabarovsk Krai, a work settlement in Sovetsko-Gavansky District of Khabarovsk Krai

== Rural localities ==
- Zavety Ilyicha, Altai Krai, a settlement in Zavetilyichevsky Selsoviet of Aleysky District in Altai Krai; 52°31′N 82°41′E
- Zavety Ilyicha, Republic of Bashkortostan, a village in Austrumsky Selsoviet of Iglinsky District in the Republic of Bashkortostan; 54°48′N 56°40′E
- Zavety Ilyicha, Krasnodar Krai, a settlement in Pervomaysky Rural Okrug of Kushchyovsky District in Krasnodar Krai; 46°30′N 39°27′E
- Zavety Ilyicha, Saratov Oblast, a selo in Engelssky District of Saratov Oblast
- Zavety Ilyicha, Smolensk Oblast, a village in Astapkovichskoye Rural Settlement of Roslavlsky District in Smolensk Oblast

== Abolished localities ==
- Zavety Ilyicha, Moscow Oblast, a former suburban settlement in Pushkinsky District of Moscow Oblast, Russia; since July 2003—a part of the city of Pushkino
