= Nikolaevsk =

Nikolaevsk could be:

- Nikolaevsk, Alaska, United States
- Nikolayevsk-on-Amur, a town in Khabarovsk Krai, Russia
- Nikolaevsk-Na-Amure Air Enterprise
- Nikolayevsk, a town in Volgograd Oblast, Russia
