= Mnogovershinny =

Urban locality in Khabarovsk Krai, Russia

Coordinates: 53°55′53″N 139°55′53″E

Mnogovershinny (Russian: Многовершинный) is an urban-type settlement in Nikolayevsky District, Khabarovsk Krai, Russia. Population: 1371 (2024 census); 2,324 (2010 Census); 2,801 (2002 Census); 3,209 (1989 Soviet census).

== History ==
=== Under the Soviet Union ===
The area around the village was discovered in 1959, with detailed geological exploration beginning in 1964.

The village of Mnogovershinny was founded in 1963, following the discovery of golden deposits by Soviet authorities. But only in 1967 would the first houses in Entuziastov Street pop up, bringing in some permanent residents in the area.

=== Under the Russian Federation ===
Despite the gold being discovered almost 30 years earlier, only in 1991 would the Nizhneamursky Mining and Processing Plant mine the very first ounce of gold at the Mnogovershinnoye deposit, leading to the creation of a miners' settlement of about 4,000 people around the deposit. This split the population in an urban and a work-force demographic. Despite initial success, in 1997, Nizhneamursky GOK was closed due to lack of funds for development, as well as poor technical and financial indicators. The license for gold mining at the Mnogovershinnoye deposit was revoked, up until 1999, when following the acquisition of the deposit by Highland Gold Mining and the formation of JSC Mnogovershinnoye, gold mining was resumed.

The company increased its gold extraction compared to its predecessor, and in 2021, JSC Mnogovershinnoye had increased gold production by 36.2%. The company's revenue for 2022 amounted to more than 36 billion rubles.

However, in February 2022, urban residents in the area voiced their dissatisfaction with the policies of the mining company, as in their opinion, the company's new management was pursuing a deliberate policy of "squeezing" local residents out of the organization to replace them with shift workers.

In 2023, JSC Mnogovershinnoye took 84th place in the Forbes rating of "100 Largest Russian Companies by Net Profit", contributing to the growth of the village.

== Geography ==
The village is located in the upper reaches of the Ul River (left tributary of the Amur ), 105 km northwest of Nikolaevsk-on-Amur.

The relief of the site is mountainous. Geomorphologically, it is located in the southeastern part of the Mevachan ridge. The highest point of the territory is Mount Orel, 1097 m high, located approximately 6 km to the south-southwest. The highest point is Mount Mnogovershinnaya, 943 m high. The lowest points are located in the valley of the Levyi Ul River and are approximately 300 m.
