= Maysky, Khabarovsk Krai =

Urban locality in Khabarovsk Krai, Russia

Coordinates: 48°59′55″N 140°12′24″E

Maysky (Russian: Майский) is an urban-type settlement in Sovetsko-Gavansky District, Khabarovsk Krai, Russia. Population: 2,598 (2010 census); 2,970 (2002 census); 4,204 (1989 Soviet census).
