= Korfovsky =

Urban locality in Khabarovsk Krai, Russia

Coordinates: 48°13′26″N 135°04′35″E

Flag of Korfovsky

Coat of arms of Korfovsky

Korfovsky (Russian: Корфовский) is an urban-type settlement in Khabarovsky District, Khabarovsk Krai, Russia. Population: 5,733 (2010 census); 5,823 (2002 census); 5,193 (1989 Soviet census).
