= Lososina =

Urban locality in Khabarovsk Krai, Russia

Coordinates: 48°59′44″N 140°19′16″E

Lososina (Russian: Лососина) is an urban-type settlement in Sovetsko-Gavansky District, Khabarovsk Krai, Russia. Population: 3,224 (2010 census); 3,246 (2002 census); 5,687 (1989 Soviet census).
