= Pervomaysky, Aleysky District, Altai Krai =

Pervomaysky Первомайский
- Settlement
- Location within Altai Krai Location within Russia
- Coordinates: 52°29′N 82°37′E
- Country: Russia
- Region: Altai Krai
- District: Aleysky District
- Time zone: UTC+7:00

Pervomaysky (Russian: Первомайский) is a rural locality (a settlement) in Aleysky Selsoviet, Aleysky District, Altai Krai, Russia. The population was 160 as of 2013. There are 4 streets.

== Geography ==
Pervomaysky is located 13 km west of Aleysk (the district's administrative centre) by road. Zavety Ilyicha is the nearest rural locality.
