= Khor, Russia =

Urban locality in Khabarovsk Krai, Russia

Coordinates: 47°53′15″N 134°57′22″E

Khor (Russian: Хор) is an urban-type settlement in Imeni Lazo District, Khabarovsk Krai, Russia. Population: 10,346 (2010 census); 11,850 (2002 census); 13,227 (1989 Soviet census).
