= Gorny, Khabarovsk Krai =

Urban locality in Khabarovsk Krai, Russia

Coordinates: 50°45′53″N 136°26′31″E

Gorny (Russian: Горный) is an urban-type settlement in Solnechny District, Khabarovsk Krai, Russia. Population: 1,523 (2010 census); 1,674 (2002 census); 2,893 (1989 Soviet census).
