= Zavety Ilyicha, Khabarovsk Krai =

Urban locality in Khabarovsk Krai, Russia

Coordinates: 49°01′29″N 140°13′15″E

Zavety Ilyicha (Russian: Заветы Ильича) is an urban-type settlement in Sovetsko-Gavansky District, Khabarovsk Krai, Russia. Population: 9,162 (2010 census); 9,429 (2002 census); 13,141 (1989 Soviet census).
