= Chastye Islands =

Chastye Is. Острова Частые
- Island group
- Location within Khabarovsk Krai
- Coordinates: 52°30′N 141°21′E
- Country: Russian Federation
- Federal subject: Khabarovsk Krai

The Chastye Islands (Russian: Острова Частые; Ostrova Chastye) is an island group in the southern end of the Sea of Okhotsk. It is located in Tatar Strait, between the mainland shore and the western coast of Sakhalin. Although there are some settlements on the adjacent coast, the Chastye Islands are uninhabited.

Administratively the Chastye Islands belong to the Khabarovsk Krai of the Russian Federation.

== Islands ==
- Pilamif Island (Остров Пиламиф) 52°27′30″N 141°21′15″E is the largest island of the Chastye group. It is 5 km long and about 2 km wide. Pilamif is surrounded by a number of smaller islands, the most important of which are:
- Tyurmus 52°30′50″N 141°21′20″E and Metmus (or Khagemif) 52°30′20″N 141°22′55″E islands lie roughly 5 km north of Pilamif.
- Giamif 52°30′55″N 141°17′20″E lies about 7 km to the northwest of Pilamif.
- Bolshoy Veliamif (or Maltsevy) 52°26′40″N 141°22′55″E and Malyy Veliamif 52°26′10″N 141°22′35″E are located only about 2 km south of Pilamif.
- Bolshoy Choma, also known as Bolshoy Chome, (Остров Большой Чома) 52°23′30″N 141°12′30″E, and Maly Choma 52°24′10″N 141°10′50″E, are located closer to the coast, southwest of Pilamif.
- Chakmut Island 52°17′N 141°20′E is located off the group further south down the coast.
- Uyuzyut 52°49′N 141°14′E is totally detached from the group and lies about 40 km north of the main cluster of islands, very close to a coastal landhead.

== Ecology ==
These small islands are a home for a great variety of seabirds.
