= Nikolaevsk-Na-Amure Air Enterprise =

Nikolayevsk-na-Amure Air Enterprise
IATA	ICAO	Call sign
-	-	-
- Commenced operations: 1992
- Operating bases: Nikolayevsk-on-Amur Airport
- Fleet size: See Fleet below
- Headquarters: Nikolayevsk-on-Amur, Khabarovsk Krai, Russia

Nikolayevsk-na-Amure Air Enterprise was an airline based in Nikolayevsk-on-Amur, Khabarovsk Krai, Russia. It operates regional services. Its main base is Nikolayevsk-on-Amur Airport.

== History ==
The airline was established in 1992. It was formerly the Aeroflot Nikolayevsk-na-Amure Division.

== Fleet ==
As of January 2005, the Nikolayevsk-na-Amure Air Enterprise fleet included:

- 3 Yakovlev Yak-40
- 1 Yakovlev Yak-40K
