= Lake Orel =

Freshwater lake in Khabarovsk Krai, Russia

- Орель (Russian)
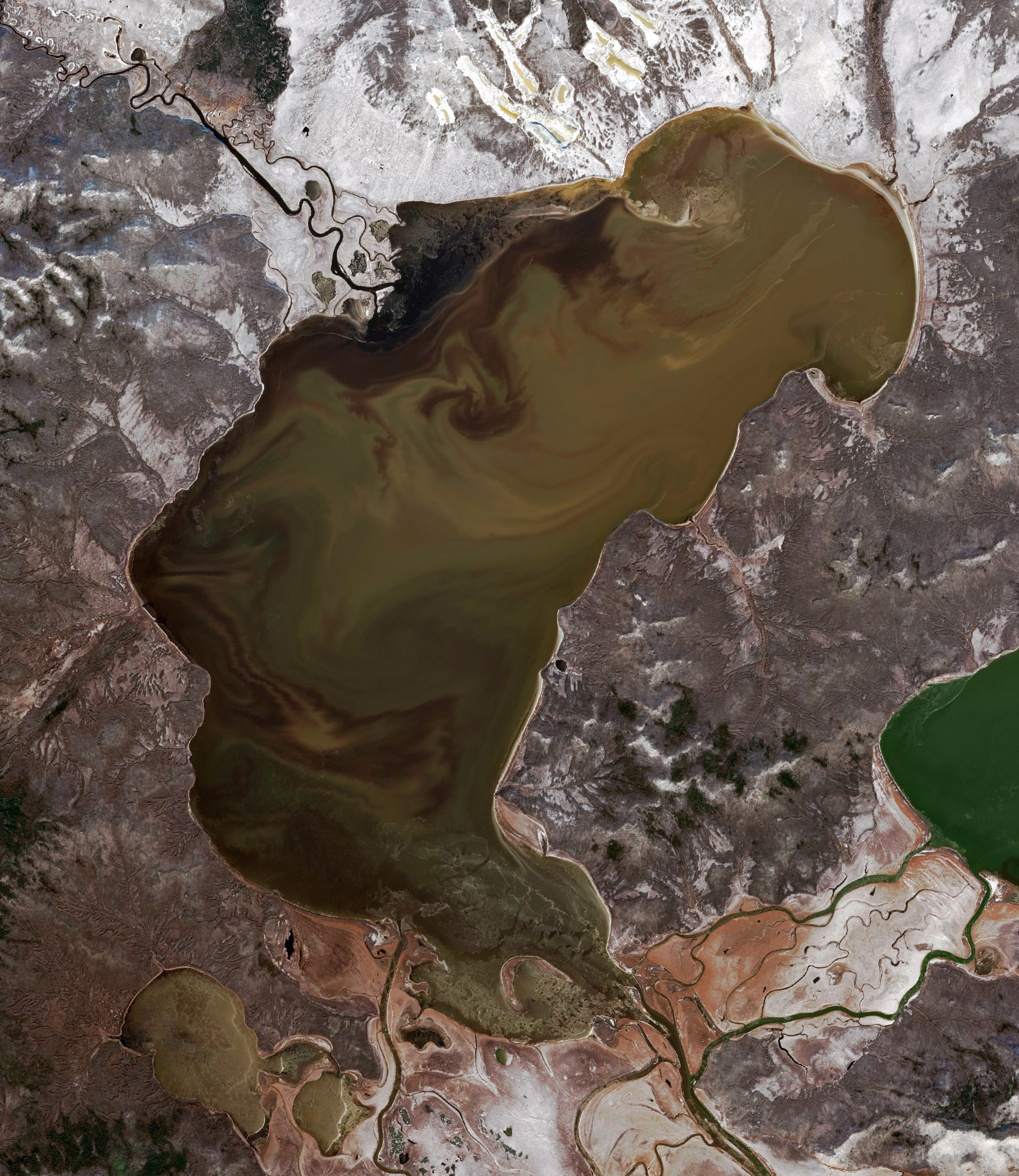
- Sentinel-2 image (2018)

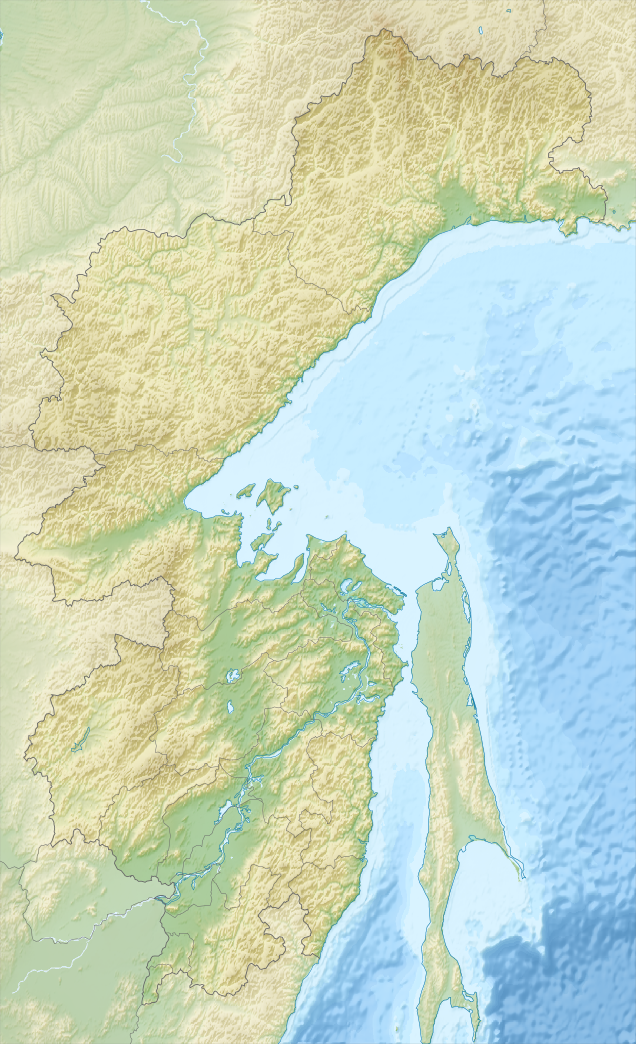
- Location within Russia Location within Khabarovsk Krai
- Location: Khabarovsk Krai, Russia
- Coordinates: 53.4672222°N 139.7630556°E
- Basin countries: Russia
- Surface area: 314 km^{2} (121 sq mi)
- Max. depth: 3.8 m (12 ft)

Lake Orel (Russian: Орель) is a large freshwater lake in Khabarovsk Krai, Russia. It has an area of 314 km^{2} and a maximum depth of 3.8 m. It is located near the left bank of the Amur River, close from its mouth.
