= Vysokogorny, Khabarovsk Krai =

Urban locality in Khabarovsk Krai, Russia

Coordinates: 50°06′00″N 139°07′42″E

Vysokogorny (Russian: Высокогорный) is an urban-type settlement in Vaninsky District, Khabarovsk Krai, Russia. Population: 3,376 (2010 census); 4,044 (2002 census); 4,244 (1989 Soviet census).
