= Bikin =

Town in Khabarovsk Krai, Russia

Bikin Бикин
- Town
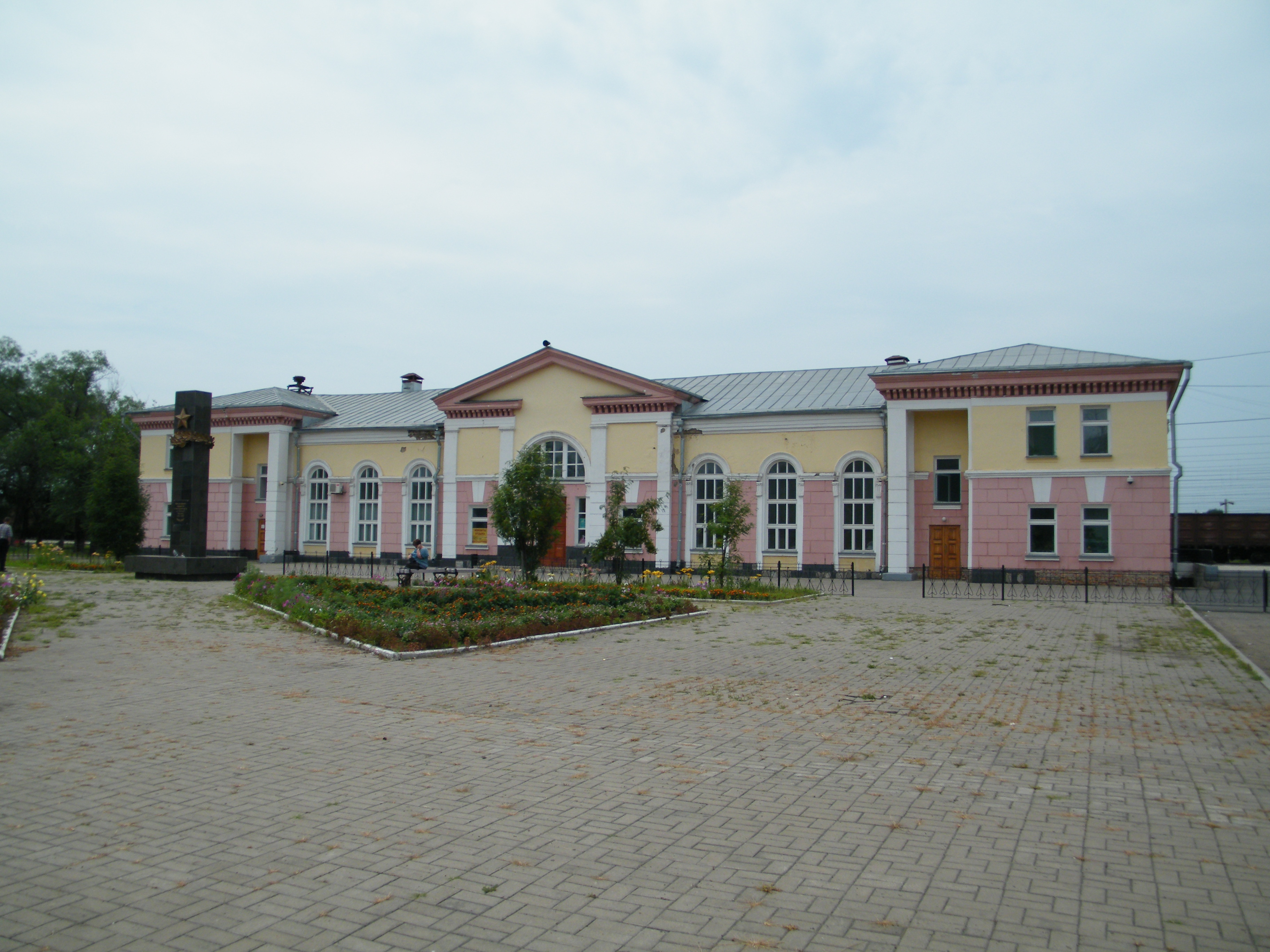
- Bikin railway station

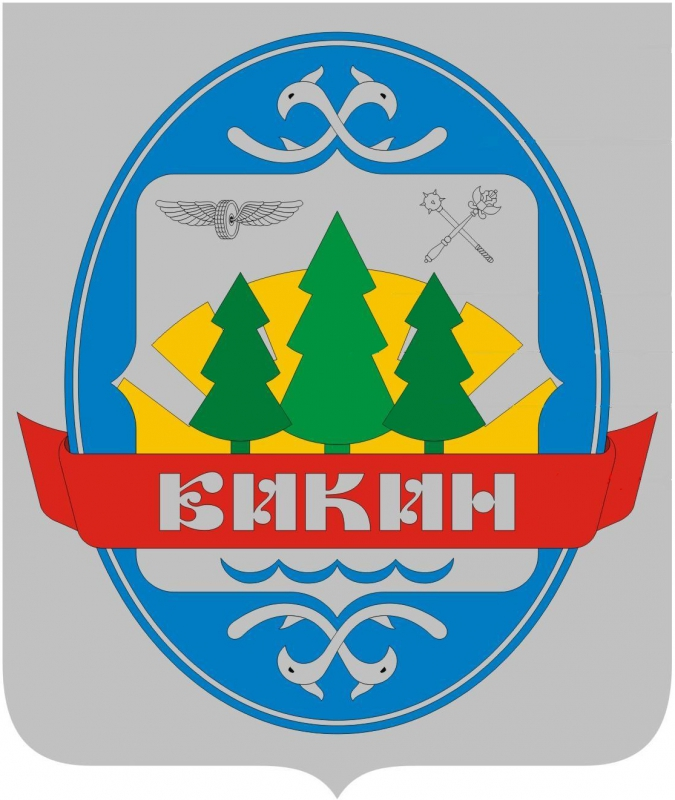
- Coat of arms
- Interactive map of Bikin
- Location of Bikin Bikin (Khabarovsk Krai)
- Coordinates: 46°49′N 134°16′E
- Country: Russia
- Federal subject: Khabarovsk Krai
- Founded: 1885
- Town status since: 1938
- Elevation: 80 m (260 ft)

Population (2010 Census)
  - Total: 17,154
  - Estimate (2025): 15,482 (−9.7%)

Administrative status
  - Subordinated to: town of krai significance of Bikin
  - Capital of: town of krai significance of Bikin, Bikinsky District

Municipal status
  - Municipal district: Bikinsky Municipal District
  - Urban settlement: Bikin Urban Settlement
  - Capital of: Bikinsky Municipal District, Bikin Urban Settlement
- Time zone: UTC+10 (MSK+7)
- Postal code: 682970
- OKTMO ID: 08609101001

Bikin (Russian: Бики́н) is a town in Khabarovsk Krai, Russia, located on the river Bikin (a tributary of the Ussuri) 230 kilometers (140 mi) southwest of Khabarovsk. Population: 17,154 (2010 census); 19,641 (2002 census); 19,129 (1989 Soviet census); 19,000 (1967).

== History ==
It was founded in 1885 as Bikinskaya and was granted town status in 1938.

== Administrative and municipal status ==
Within the framework of administrative divisions, Bikin serves as the administrative center of Bikinsky District, even though it is not a part of it. As an administrative division, it is incorporated separately as the town of krai significance of Bikin—an administrative unit with the status equal to that of the districts. As a municipal division, the town of krai significance of Bikin is incorporated within Bikinsky Municipal District as Bikin Urban Settlement.

== Geography ==
=== Climate ===
Bikin has a dry-winter humid continental climate (Köppen Dwb), similar to Khabarovsk or Blagoveshchensk and featuring frigid, dry winters alongside very warm, humid and wet summers. It is in one of the most continental regions of the world in terms of achieving summer heat and bitterly cold winters simultaneously, due to the influence of the Siberian High and the East Asian monsoon.

Climate data for Bikin
Month	Jan	Feb	Mar	Apr	May	Jun	Jul	Aug	Sep	Oct	Nov	Dec	Year
Record high °C (°F)	1.0 (33.8)	7.8 (46.0)	18.0 (64.4)	29.4 (84.9)	33.9 (93.0)	36.1 (97.0)	37.8 (100.0)	38.0 (100.4)	34.0 (93.2)	26.2 (79.2)	16.1 (61.0)	6.1 (43.0)	38.0 (100.4)
Mean daily maximum °C (°F)	−14.2 (6.4)	−8.8 (16.2)	0.1 (32.2)	11.3 (52.3)	19.2 (66.6)	23.9 (75.0)	27.0 (80.6)	25.8 (78.4)	19.9 (67.8)	11.3 (52.3)	−1.5 (29.3)	−11.6 (11.1)	8.9 (48.0)
Daily mean °C (°F)	−20.9 (−5.6)	−16.1 (3.0)	−5.9 (21.4)	5.4 (41.7)	12.9 (55.2)	18.1 (64.6)	21.6 (70.9)	20.4 (68.7)	13.6 (56.5)	5.1 (41.2)	−6.9 (19.6)	−17.3 (0.9)	2.8 (37.0)
Mean daily minimum °C (°F)	−28.1 (−18.6)	−24.6 (−12.3)	−13.7 (7.3)	−1.5 (29.3)	5.7 (42.3)	11.9 (53.4)	16.0 (60.8)	15.1 (59.2)	7.1 (44.8)	−1.8 (28.8)	−13.4 (7.9)	−24.1 (−11.4)	−3.9 (25.0)
Record low °C (°F)	−42.8 (−45.0)	−37.2 (−35.0)	−31.1 (−24.0)	−13.9 (7.0)	−6.1 (21.0)	1.1 (34.0)	5.0 (41.0)	4.0 (39.2)	−5.0 (23.0)	−17.0 (1.4)	−32.2 (−26.0)	−45.0 (−49.0)	−45.0 (−49.0)
Average precipitation mm (inches)	17.1 (0.67)	20.6 (0.81)	24.6 (0.97)	39.5 (1.56)	70.5 (2.78)	78.8 (3.10)	127.0 (5.00)	130.8 (5.15)	91.6 (3.61)	40.8 (1.61)	24.9 (0.98)	20.6 (0.81)	686.8 (27.04)
Average precipitation days	8.7	5.7	7.7	7.4	7.8	5.5	7.6	7.8	5.3	7.3	7.2	8.0	86
Average relative humidity (%)	78.2	72.9	69.0	62.0	62.3	68.1	74.9	78.5	74.4	67.4	71.8	77.3	71.4
Source: Weatherbase

== External Sources ==
- Правительство Хабаровского края. Постановление №143-пр от 18 июля 2007 г. «Об утверждении реестра административно-территориальных и территориальных единиц Хабаровского края», в ред. Постановления №273-пр от 28 августа 2015 г. «О внесении изменений в Постановление Правительства Хабаровского края от 18 июля 2007 г. №143-пр "Об утверждении реестра административно-территориальных и территориальных единиц Хабаровского края"». Вступил в силу 13 августа 2007 г. Опубликован: "Собрание законодательства Хабаровского края", №7(60), 12 августа 2007 г. (Government of Khabarovsk Krai. Resolution #143-pr of July 18, 2007 On the Adoption of the Registry of the Administrative-Territorial and Territorial Units of Khabarovsk Krai, as amended by the Resolution #273-pr of August 28, 2015 On Amending the Resolution #143-pr of the Government of Khabarovsk Krai of July 18, 2007 "On the Adoption of the Registry of the Administrative-Territorial and Territorial Units of Khabarovsk Krai". Effective as of August 13, 2007.).
- Законодательная Дума Хабаровского края. Закон №191 от 30 июня 2004 г. «О наделении административных центров районов статусом городского, сельского поселения и об установлении их границ», в ред. Закона №172 от 29 февраля 2012 г. «Об упразднении сельского населённого пункта посёлок Фестивальный, находящегося на территории Солнечного района Хабаровского края, и о внесении изменений в отдельные Законы Хабаровского края». Вступил в силу со дня официального опубликования. Опубликован: "Приамурские ведомости", №№126–127, 15 июля 2004 г. (Legislative Duma of Khabarovsk Krai. Law #191 of June 30, 2004 On Granting the Administrative Centers of the Districts the Status of Urban, Rural Settlements and on Establishing Their Borders, as amended by the Law #172 of February 29, 2012 On the Abolition of the Rural Locality of the Settlement of Festivalny on the Territory of Solnechny District of Khabarovsk Krai and on Amending Various Laws of Khabarovsk Krai. Effective as of the day of the official publication.).
- Законодательная Дума Хабаровского края. Закон №264 от 14 марта 2005 г «Об административных центрах сельских поселений и муниципальных районов Хабаровского края», в ред. Закона №239 от 28 ноября 2012 г. «О преобразовании городского населённого пункта рабочий посёлок Тырма, находящегося на территории Верхнебуреинского района Хабаровского края, путём изменения его статуса в сельский населённый пункт — посёлок Тырма и о внесении изменений в отдельные Законы Хабаровского края». Вступил в силу со дня официального опубликования. Опубликован: "Приамурские ведомости", №57, 1 апреля 2005 г. (Legislative Duma of Khabarovsk Krai. Law #264 of March 14, 2005 On the Administrative Centers of the Rural Settlements and the Municipal Districts of Khabarovsk Krai, as amended by the Law #239 of November 28, 2012 On the Transformation of the Urban Locality the Work Settlement of Tyrma, Located on the Territory of Verkhnebureinsky District of Khabarovsk Krai, by Changing Its Status to That of a Rural Locality—the Settlement of Tyrma, and on Amending Various Laws of Khabarovsk Krai. Effective as of the day of the official publication.).
