= Khabarovsky District =

Khabarovsky District Хабаровский район (Russian)
- District
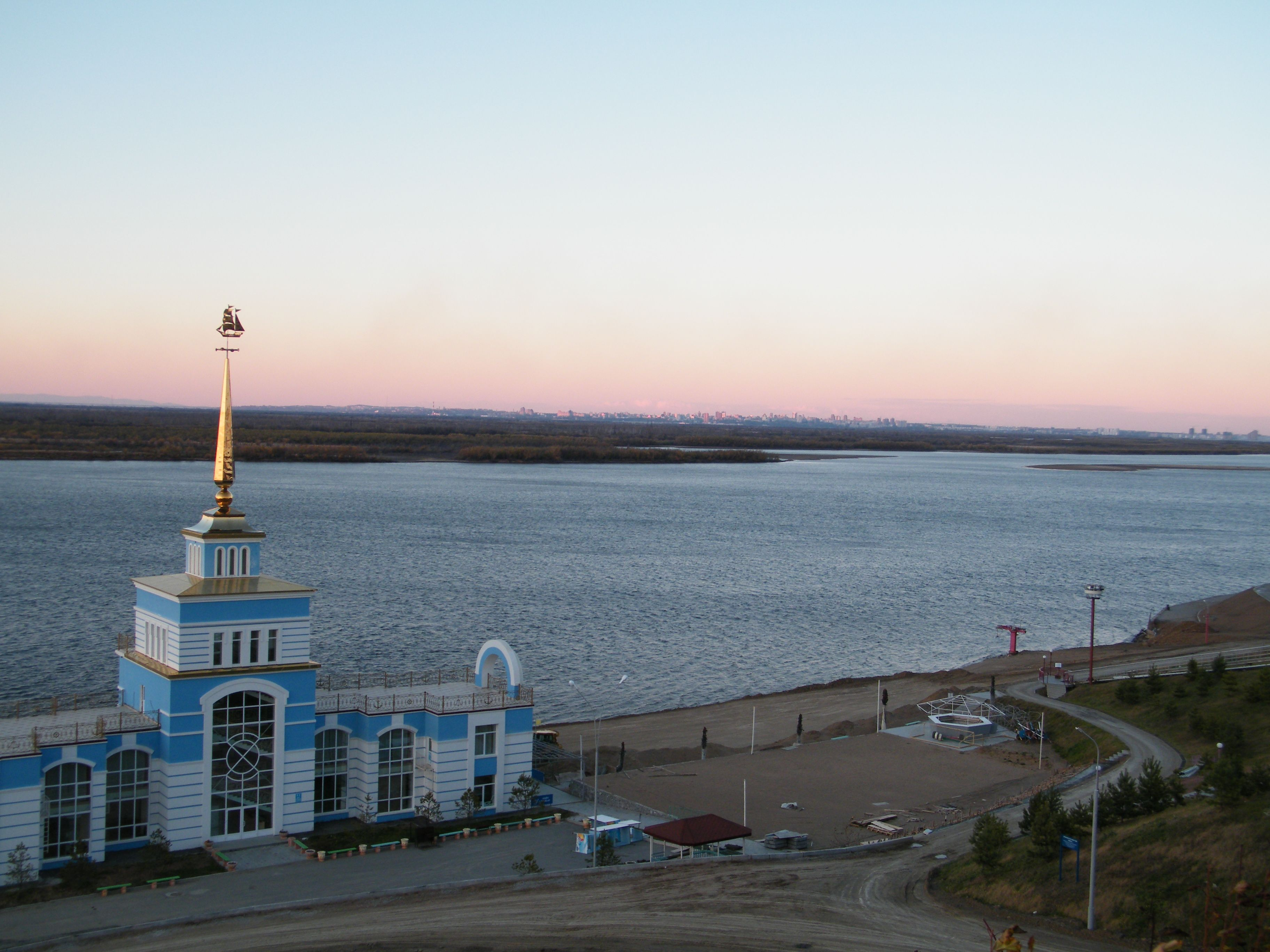
- View of Amur River

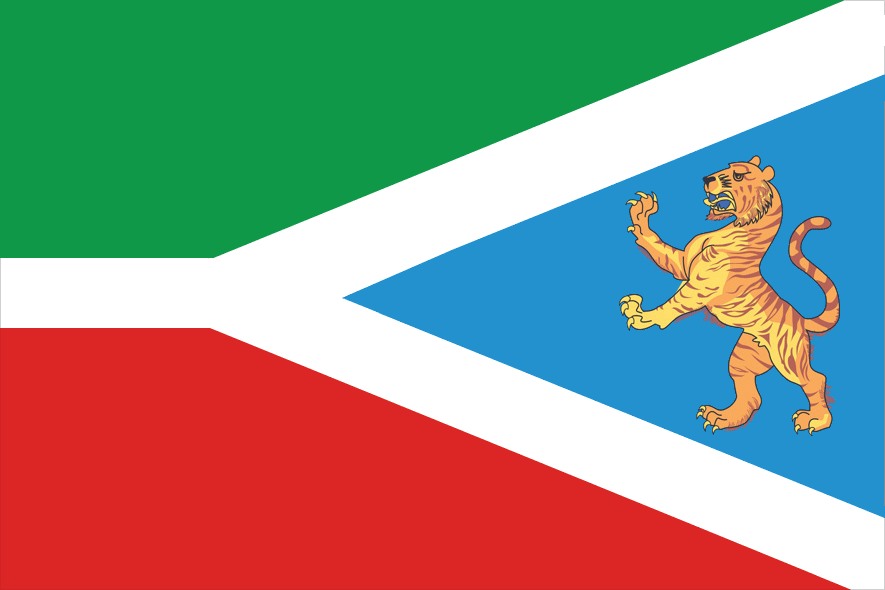
- Flag Coat of arms
- Location of Khabarovsky District in Khabarovsk Krai
- Coordinates: 49°20′N 134°30′E
- Country: Russia
- Federal subject: Khabarovsk Krai
- Established: 1937
- Administrative center: Khabarovsk

Area
  - Total: 30,014 km^{2} (11,588 sq mi)

Population (2010 Census)
  - Total: 85,404
  - Density: 2.8455/km^{2} (7.3697/sq mi)
  - Urban: 6.7%
  - Rural: 93.3%

Administrative structure
  - Inhabited localities: 1 urban-type settlements, 69 rural localities

Municipal structure
  - Municipally incorporated as: Khabarovsky Municipal District
  - Municipal divisions: 1 urban settlements, 26 rural settlements
- Time zone: UTC+10 (MSK+7)
- OKTMO ID: 08655000
- Website: http://khabrayon.ru/

Khabarovsky District (Russian: Хаба́ровский райо́н) is an administrative and municipal district (raion), one of the seventeen in Khabarovsk Krai, Russia. It consists of two unconnected segments separated by the territory of Amursky District, which are located in the southwest of the krai. The area of the district is 30,014 square kilometers (11,588 sq mi). Its administrative center is the city of Khabarovsk (which is not administratively a part of the district). Population: 85,404 (2010 census); 90,179 (2002 census); 85,218 (1989 Soviet census).

== Administrative and municipal status ==
Within the framework of administrative divisions, Khabarovsky District is one of the seventeen in the krai. The city of Khabarovsk serves as its administrative center, despite being incorporated separately as a town of krai significance—an administrative unit with the status equal to that of the districts.

As a municipal division, the district is incorporated as Khabarovsky Municipal District. The city of krai significance of Khabarovsk is incorporated separately from the district as Khabarovsk Urban Okrug
