= Zavety Ilyicha, Republic of Bashkortostan =

Zavety Ilyicha Заветы Ильича
- Village
- Location within Bashkortostan Location within Russia
- Coordinates: 54°47′N 56°40′E
- Country: Russia
- Region: Bashkortostan
- District: Iglinsky District
- Time zone: UTC+5:00

Zavety Ilyicha (Russian: Заветы Ильича) is a rural locality (a village) in Austrumsky Selsoviet, Iglinsky District, Bashkortostan, Russia. The population was 17 as of 2010. There are 2 streets.

== Geography ==
Zavety Ilyicha is located 29 km east of Iglino (the district's administrative centre) by road. Zagorskoye is the nearest rural locality.
