= Mukhen =

Urban locality in Khabarovsk Krai, Russia

Coordinates: 48°11′47″N 136°07′27″E

Mukhen (Russian: Мухен) is an urban-type settlement in Imeni Lazo District, Khabarovsk Krai, Russia. Population: 4,068 (2010 Census); 4,756 (2002 Census); 6,142 (1989 Soviet census).
