= Sovetskaya Gavan =

Town in Khabarovsk Krai, Russia

Sovetskaya Gavan Советская Гавань
- Town
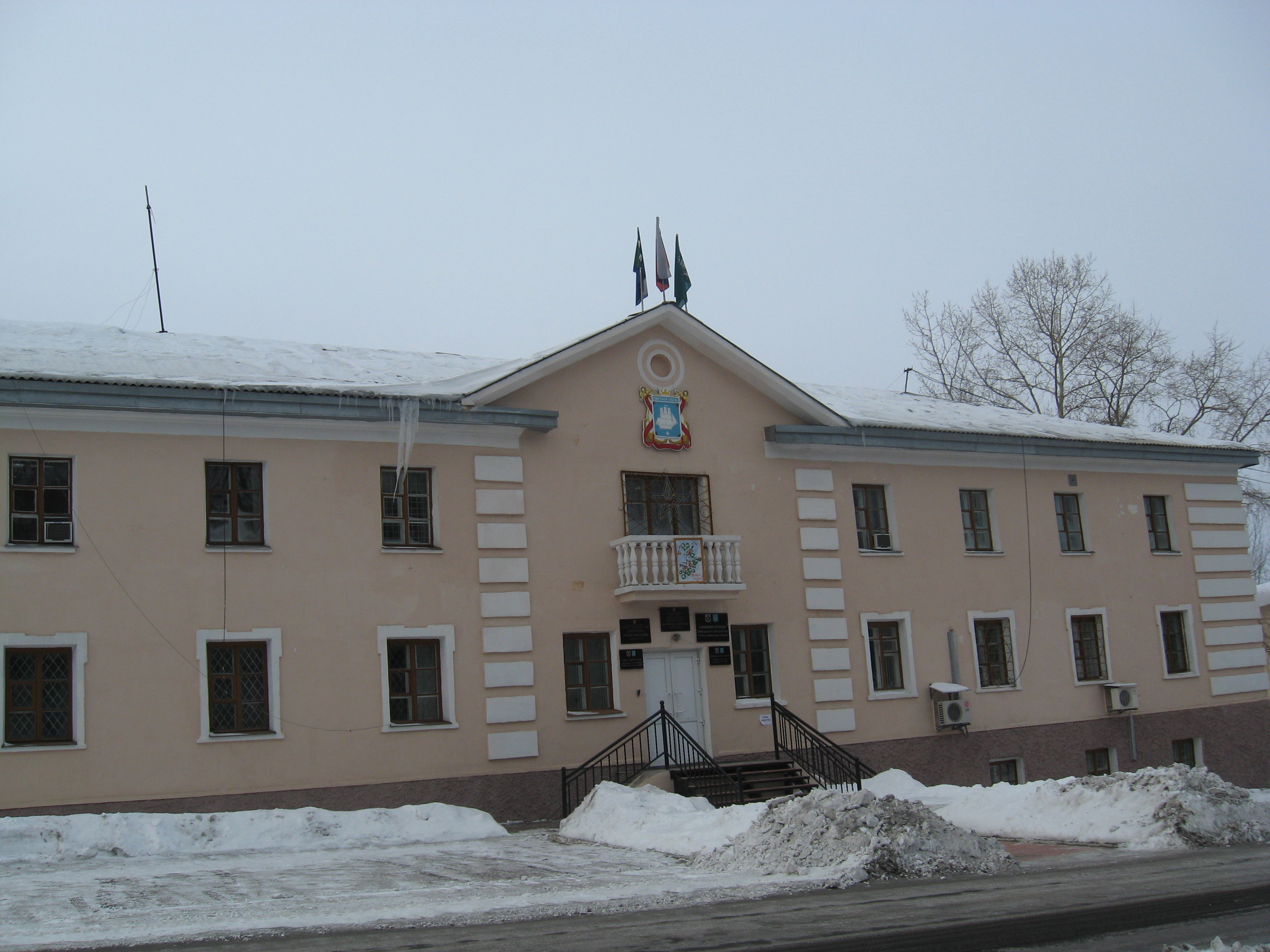
- Sovetskaya Gavan Administration building

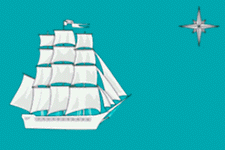
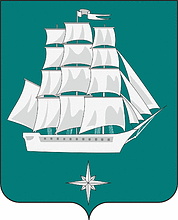
- Flag Coat of arms
- Interactive map of Sovetskaya Gavan
- Location of Sovetskaya Gavan Sovetskaya Gavan (Khabarovsk Krai)
- Coordinates: 48°58′N 140°17′E
- Country: Russia
- Federal subject: Khabarovsk Krai
- Founded: August 4, 1853
- Town status since: 1941

Government
  - Head: Pavel Borovsky
- Elevation: 20 m (66 ft)

Population (2010 Census)
  - Total: 27,712
  - Estimate (2025): 23,232 (−16.2%)

Administrative status
  - Subordinated to: town of krai significance of Sovetskaya Gavan
  - Capital of: town of krai significance of Sovetskaya Gavan, Sovetsko-Gavansky District

Municipal status
  - Municipal district: Sovetsko-Gavansky Municipal District
  - Urban settlement: Sovetskaya Gavan Urban Settlement
  - Capital of: Sovetsko-Gavansky Municipal District, Sovetskaya Gavan Urban Settlement
- Time zone: UTC+10 (MSK+7)
- Postal code: 682880
- Dialing code: +7 42138
- OKTMO ID: 08642101001
- Website: admsovgav.ru

Sovetskaya Gavan (Russian: Сове́тская Га́вань, lit. 'Soviet harbor') is a town in Khabarovsk Krai, Russia, and a port on the Strait of Tartary which connects the Sea of Okhotsk in the north with the Sea of Japan in the south. Population: 27,712 (2010 census); 30,480 (2002 census); 34,915 (1989 Soviet census).

It was previously known as Imperatorskaya Gavan (Императорская Гавань, lit. 'Imperial harbour') until 1922.

== Name ==
The name of the town is often informally abbreviated to "Sovgavan" (Совгавань).

== History ==
On May 23, 1853, Lt. Nikolay Konstantinovich Boshnyak of the Russian-American Company ship Nikolay discovered the bay on which Sovetskaya Gavan is located and named it Khadzhi Bay. On August 4, 1853, Captain Gennady Nevelskoy founded a military post named after Admiral Grand Duke Konstantin, and renamed the bay to Imperatorskaya Gavan ('Emperor's Harbor' or 'Port Imperial'). The bay was also known to the English as Barracouta Harbour. Nikolay Boshnyak was appointed the commander of the post, which became the first Russian settlement in the area, and the predecessor of today's Sovetskaya Gavan.

After the abandonment of the military post before 1900, the area became a center for timber production, including concessions to companies from other countries such as Canada.

The bay and the settlement were renamed Sovetskaya Gavan in 1922.

During World War II, construction was begun on a railway from the right bank of the Amur River near Komsomolsk-on-Amur to the Pacific coast, with Sovetskaya Gavan chosen as the endpoint. Sovetskaya Gavan was granted town status in 1941; the railway reached the town in 1945. This section of railway was the first section to be completed of what would later become the Baikal-Amur Mainline.

From 1950 until 1954, the town was the site of the prison camp Ulminlag of the gulag system.

In 1958, the town's northern neighborhood, on the Vanino Bay, was separated into a separate urban-type settlement of Vanino.

In 1963–1964, six sounding rockets of "Kosmos 2"-type were launched. They reached the height of 402 kilometers (250 mi).

== Administrative and municipal status ==
Within the framework of administrative divisions, Sovetskaya Gavan serves as the administrative center of Sovetsko-Gavansky District even though it is not a part of it. As an administrative division, it is incorporated separately as the town of krai significance of Sovetskaya Gavan—an administrative unit with the status equal to that of the districts. As a municipal division, the town of krai significance of Sovetskaya Gavan is incorporated within Sovetsko-Gavansky Municipal District as Sovetskaya Gavan Urban Settlement.

== Climate ==
Sovetskaya Gavan has a humid continental climate (Köppen Dfb). The mild September temperatures caused by seasonal lag keep the climate within the continental range. This also means that among summer months, June is the fourth warmest, in spite of the highest sun strength being reached during that month. Apart from that there is a strong subarctic and Siberian High influence that keeps winters extremely cold for a coastal location at 49 degrees latitude.

Climate data for Sovetskaya Gavan (1914–2012)
Month	Jan	Feb	Mar	Apr	May	Jun	Jul	Aug	Sep	Oct	Nov	Dec	Year
Record high °C (°F)	2.6 (36.7)	12.2 (54.0)	18.9 (66.0)	25.1 (77.2)	31.8 (89.2)	35.1 (95.2)	34.2 (93.6)	35.8 (96.4)	30.2 (86.4)	26.8 (80.2)	16.5 (61.7)	9.4 (48.9)	35.8 (96.4)
Mean daily maximum °C (°F)	−11.4 (11.5)	−8.3 (17.1)	−1.8 (28.8)	5.6 (42.1)	11.6 (52.9)	16.8 (62.2)	20.5 (68.9)	21.9 (71.4)	18.2 (64.8)	10.9 (51.6)	0.0 (32.0)	−8.7 (16.3)	6.3 (43.3)
Daily mean °C (°F)	−16.8 (1.8)	−14.2 (6.4)	−7.4 (18.7)	1.1 (34.0)	6.6 (43.9)	11.5 (52.7)	15.6 (60.1)	17.4 (63.3)	13.3 (55.9)	6.0 (42.8)	−4.7 (23.5)	−13.5 (7.7)	1.3 (34.3)
Mean daily minimum °C (°F)	−22.2 (−8.0)	−20.1 (−4.2)	−12.9 (8.8)	−3.5 (25.7)	1.5 (34.7)	6.2 (43.2)	10.7 (51.3)	12.9 (55.2)	8.4 (47.1)	1.0 (33.8)	−9.3 (15.3)	−18.3 (−0.9)	−3.8 (25.2)
Record low °C (°F)	−40.0 (−40.0)	−38.6 (−37.5)	−30.3 (−22.5)	−26.4 (−15.5)	−9.5 (14.9)	−3.0 (26.6)	2.4 (36.3)	4.0 (39.2)	−1.7 (28.9)	−14.7 (5.5)	−31.3 (−24.3)	−38.4 (−37.1)	−40.0 (−40.0)
Average precipitation mm (inches)	19.9 (0.78)	20.7 (0.81)	42.9 (1.69)	47.5 (1.87)	73.9 (2.91)	70.1 (2.76)	82.1 (3.23)	109.6 (4.31)	117.2 (4.61)	87.7 (3.45)	43.4 (1.71)	32.7 (1.29)	747.7 (29.42)
Average precipitation days	6.8	7.0	9.6	10.3	13.2	12.9	13.4	14.7	13.1	9.2	6.1	6.6	122.9

== Economy ==
Sovetskaya Gavan's economy is largely dependent on the harbour and related activities; the town has a deep water port for cargo and fishing vessels, as well as ship repair facilities. There is also some foodstuffs production, such as fish processing.

=== Transportation ===
In 1973, Vanino-Kholmsk train ferry to the island Sakhalin was opened, joining the mainland at Vanino, 30 kilometers (19 mi) north of Sovetskaya Gavan. Whilst this diminished Sovetskaya Gavan's importance as a trading port, until the 1990s it remained an important supply harbor for the Russian Pacific Fleet.

Sovetskaya Gavan is connected by rail with Komsomolsk-on-Amur, the section of line being the most easterly section of the Baikal-Amur Mainline.

The town is served by Kamenny Ruchey naval airfield (also known as Mongokhto) as well as the May-gatka Airport and Mayskiy Airport airbase .

== Sister city ==
- Everett, Washington, United States
