= Bikinsky District =

Bikinsky District Бикинский район (Russian)
- District
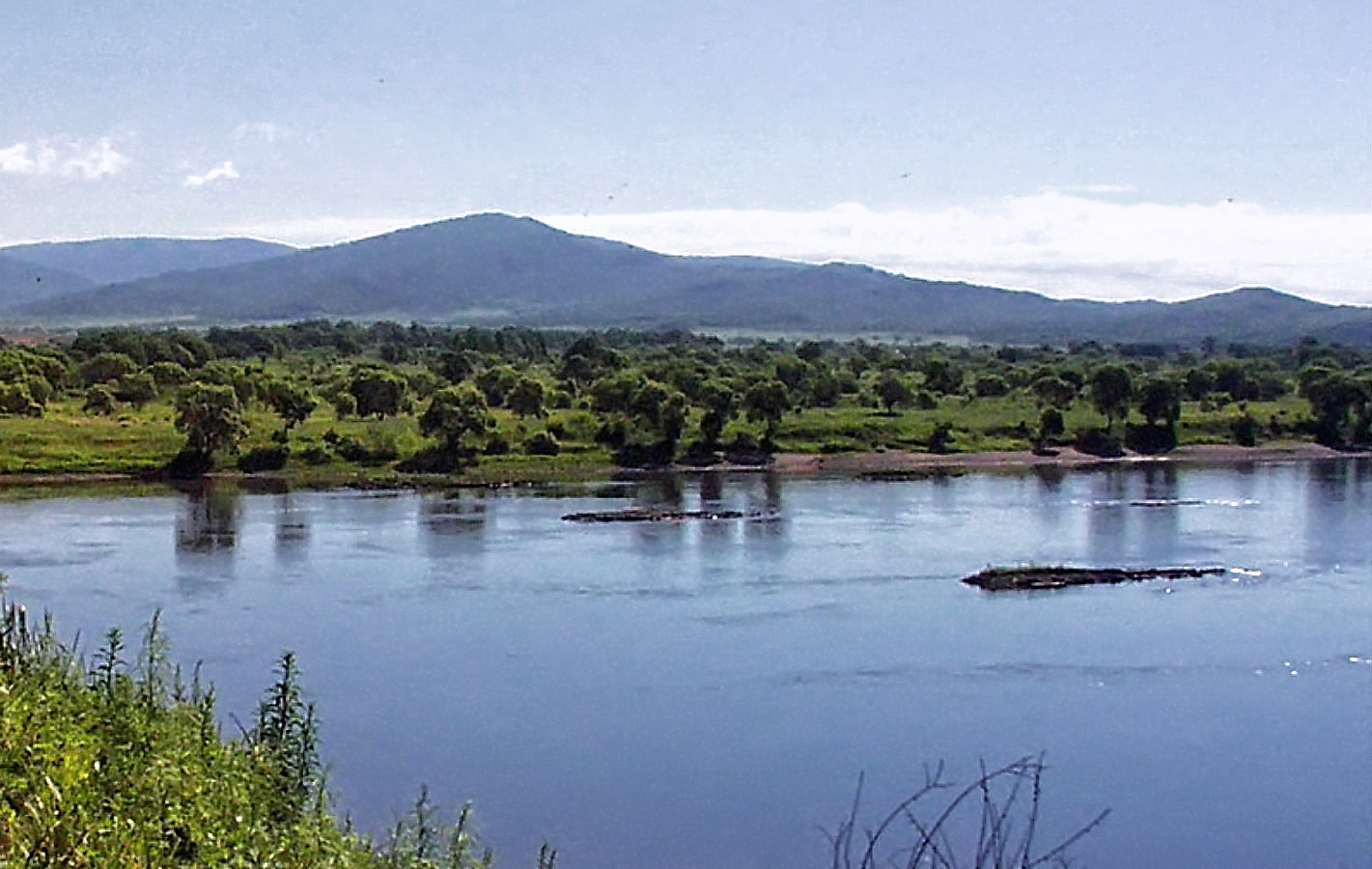
- Bikin River

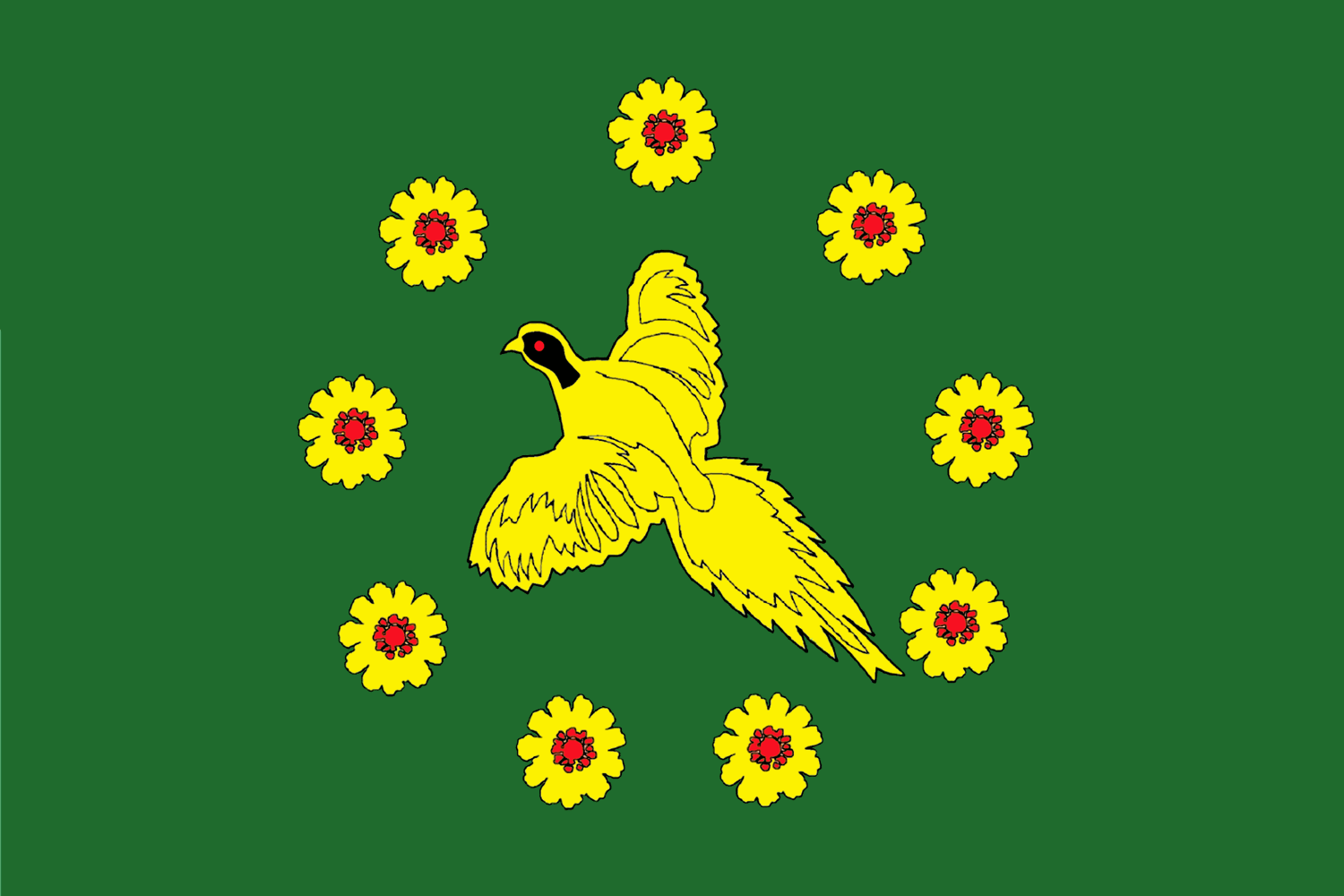
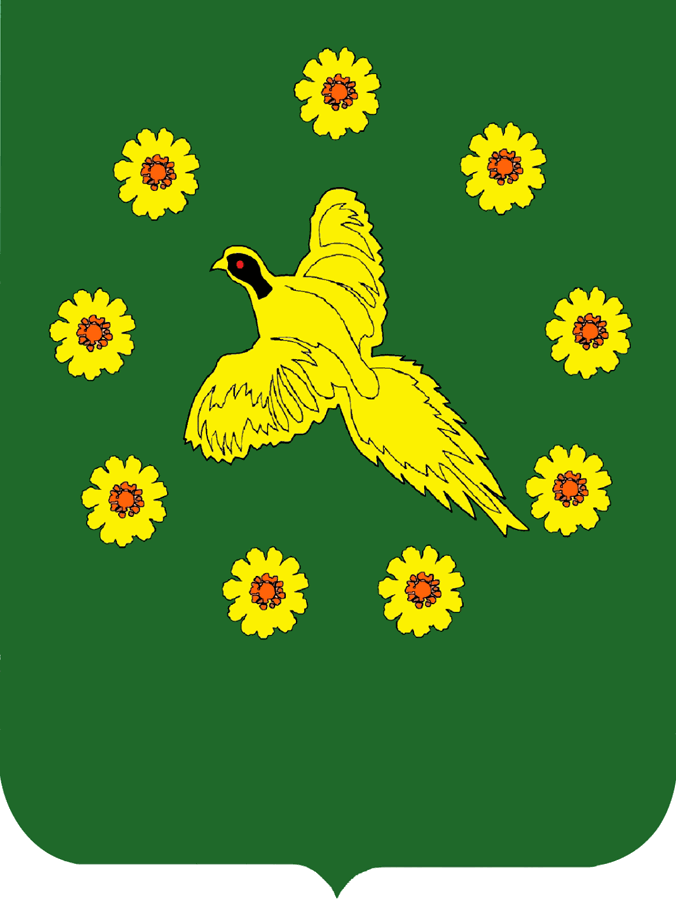
- Flag Coat of arms
- Location of Bikinsky District in Khabarovsk Krai
- Coordinates: 46°49′N 134°16′E
- Country: Russia
- Federal subject: Khabarovsk Krai
- Established: 1932
- Administrative center: Bikin

Area
  - Total: 2,483 km^{2} (959 sq mi)

Population (2010 Census)
  - Total: 7,264
  - Density: 2.925/km^{2} (7.577/sq mi)
  - Urban: 0%
  - Rural: 100%

Administrative structure
  - Inhabited localities: 11 rural localities

Municipal structure
  - Municipally incorporated as: Bikinsky Municipal District
  - Municipal divisions: 1 urban settlements, 8 rural settlements
- Time zone: UTC+10 (MSK+7)
- OKTMO ID: 08609000
- Website: http://bikinadm.ru/

Bikinsky District (Russian: Бики́нский райо́н) is an administrative and municipal district (raion), one of the seventeen in Khabarovsk Krai, Russia. It is located in the southwest of the krai. The area of the district is 2,483 square kilometers (959 sq mi). Its administrative center is the town of Bikin (which is not administratively a part of the district). Population: 7,264 (2010 census); 8,630 (2002 census); 10,338 (1989 Soviet census).

== Administrative and municipal status ==
Within the framework of administrative divisions, Bikinsky District is one of the seventeen in the krai. The town of Bikin serves as its administrative center, despite being incorporated separately as a town of krai significance—an administrative unit with the status equal to that of the districts.

As a municipal division, the district is incorporated as Bikinsky Municipal District, with the town of krai significance of Bikin being incorporated within it as Bikin Urban Settlement.
