= Amursk =

Town in Khabarovsk Krai, Russia

Amursk Амурск
- Town
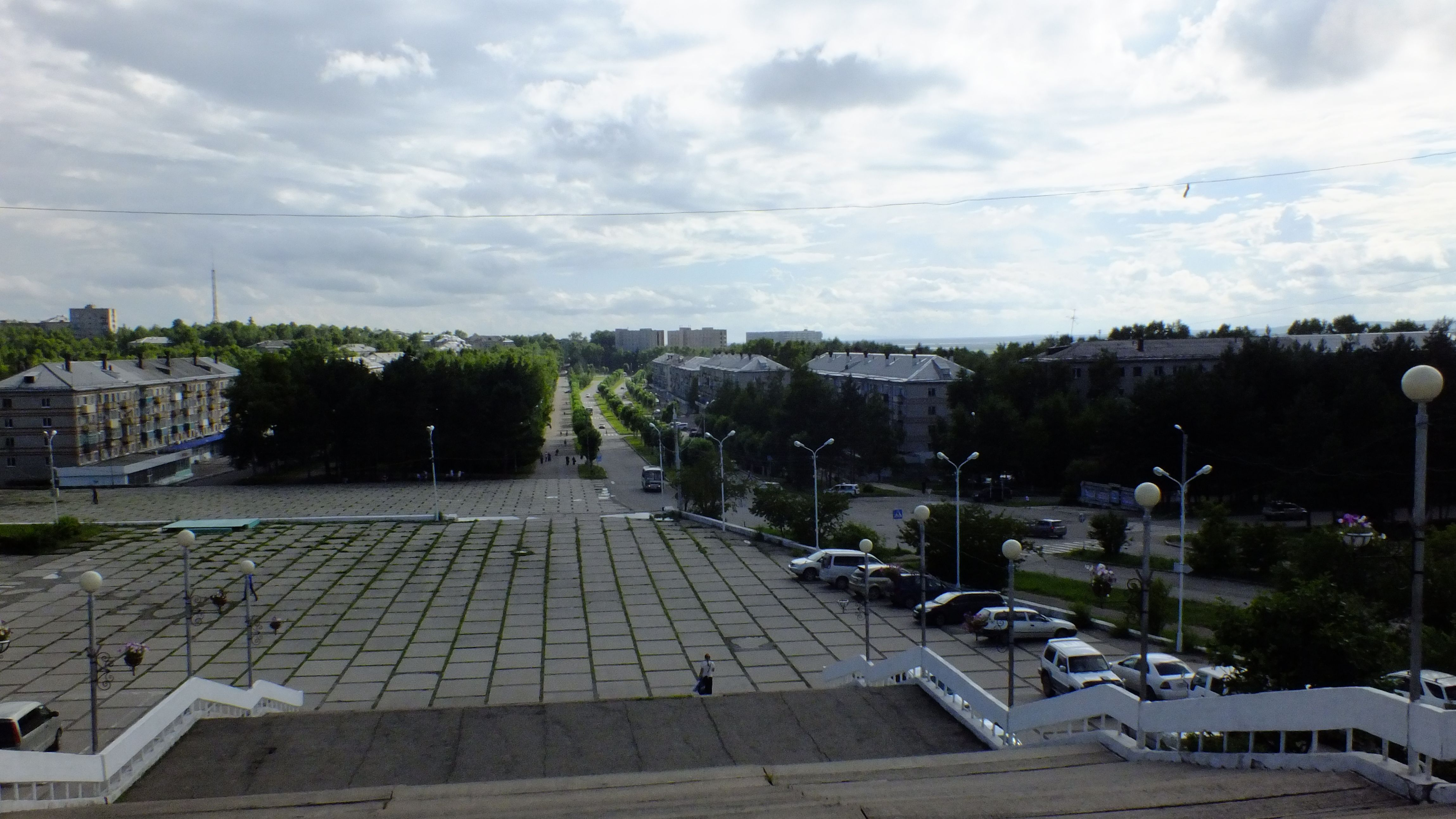
- Amursk (2015)

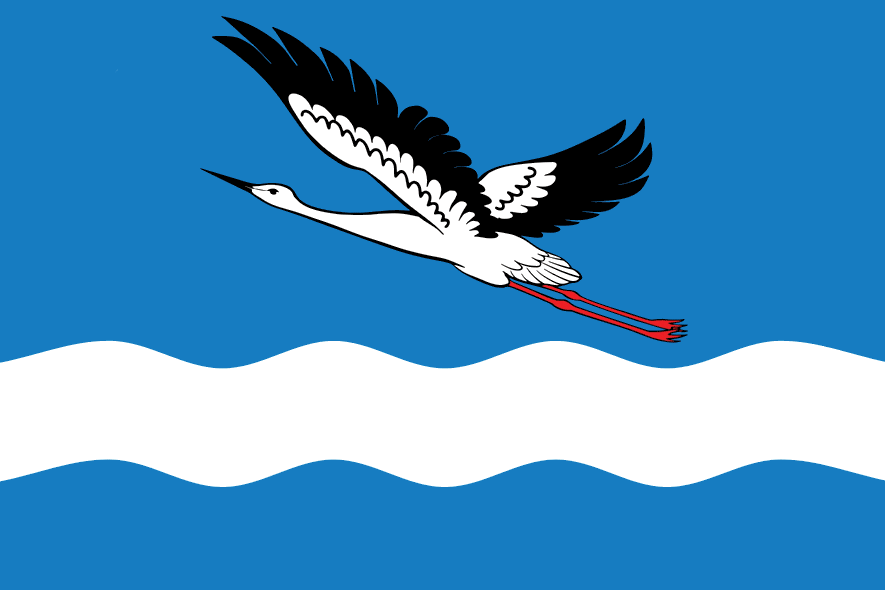
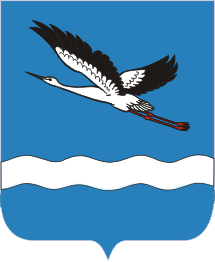
- Flag Coat of arms
- Interactive map of Amursk
- Location of Amursk Amursk (Khabarovsk Krai)
- Coordinates: 50°13′N 136°54′E
- Country: Russia
- Federal subject: Khabarovsk Krai
- Founded: June 19, 1958
- Town status since: 1973
- Elevation: 46 m (151 ft)

Population (2010 Census)
  - Total: 42,970
  - Estimate (2025): 37,204 (−13.4%)

Administrative status
  - Subordinated to: town of krai significance of Amursk
  - Capital of: town of krai significance of Amursk, Amursky District

Municipal status
  - Municipal district: Amursky Municipal District
  - Urban settlement: Amursk Urban Settlement
  - Capital of: Amursky Municipal District, Amursk Urban Settlement
- Time zone: UTC+10 (MSK+7)
- Postal code: 682640–682642
- Dialing code: +7 42142
- OKTMO ID: 08603101001
- Website: www.amursk.khv.ru

Amursk (Russian: Аму́рск) is a town in Khabarovsk Krai, Russia, located on the left bank of the Amur River 45 kilometers (28 mi) south of Komsomolsk-on-Amur. The population as of 2024 is 37,501 people.

== History ==
It was founded as an urban-type settlement on June 19, 1958, in connection with the construction of a pulp mill near the Nanai settlement Padali. Town status was granted to it in 1973.

== Administrative and municipal status ==
Within the framework of administrative divisions, Amursk serves as the administrative center of Amursky District, even though it is not a part of it. As an administrative division, it is incorporated separately as the town of krai significance of Amursk—an administrative unit with the status equal to that of the districts. As a municipal division, Amursk is incorporated within Amursky Municipal District as Amursk Urban Settlement.

== Demographics ==
The population grew from 3,500 in 1959 to a high point of 58,395 inhabitants in 1989. Since the dissolution of the Soviet Union, the population trend reversed.

== Economy ==
In addition to the cellulose and paper mill, there is chemical production and timber production conducted in and near the town, as well as some machinery production.

=== Transportation ===
There is a goods railway to the town, connecting to the Khabarovsk-Komsomolsk-Dzemgi line at the station of Mylki. There is also a road connection to Komsomolsk-on-Amur.
