= Zavety Ilyicha, Altai Krai =

Zavety Ilyicha Заветы Ильича
- Settlement
- Location within Altai Krai Location within Russia
- Coordinates: 52°30′N 82°41′E
- Country: Russia
- Region: Altai Krai
- District: Aleysky District
- Time zone: UTC+7:00

Zavety Ilyicha (Russian: Заветы Ильича) is a rural locality (a settlement) and the administrative center of Zavetilyichyovsky Selsoviet, Aleysky District, Altai Krai, Russia. The population was 600 in 2013. There are 11 streets.

== Geography ==
Zavety Ilyicha is located on the Gorevka River, 8 kilometres (5.0 mi) northwest of Aleysk (the district's administrative centre) by road. Aleysk is the nearest rural locality.
