= Nikolayevsky District, Khabarovsk Krai =

Nikolayevsky District Николаевский район (Russian)
- District
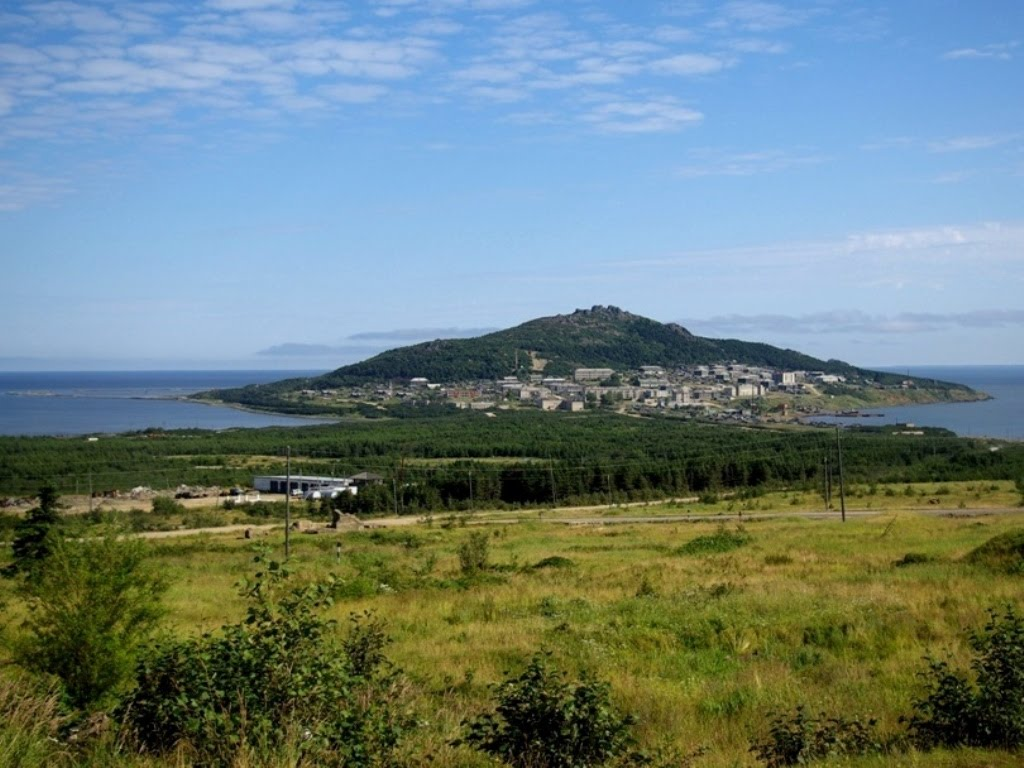
- Lazarev, Khabarovsk Krai

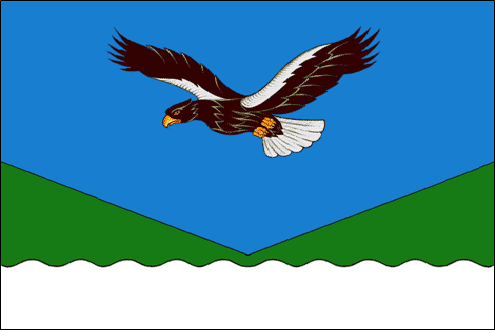
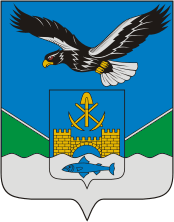
- Flag Coat of arms
- Location of Nikolayevsky District in Khabarovsk Krai
- Coordinates: 53°09′N 140°44′E
- Country: Russia
- Federal subject: Khabarovsk Krai
- Established: 12 January 1965
- Administrative center: Nikolayevsk-on-Amur

Area
  - Total: 17,188 km^{2} (6,636 sq mi)

Population (2010 Census)
  - Total: 9,942
  - Density: 0.5784/km^{2} (1.498/sq mi)
  - Urban: 51.4%
  - Rural: 48.6%

Administrative structure
  - Inhabited localities: 2 urban-type settlements, 25 rural localities

Municipal structure
  - Municipally incorporated as: Nikolayevsky Municipal District
  - Municipal divisions: 3 urban settlements, 11 rural settlements
- Time zone: UTC+10 (MSK+7)
- OKTMO ID: 08631000
- Website: http://www.nikoladm.ru/

Nikolayevsky District (Russian: Никола́евский райо́н, romanized: Nikolayevskiy rayon) is an administrative and municipal district (raion), one of the seventeen in Khabarovsk Krai, Russia. It is located in the east of the krai. The area of the district is 17,188 square kilometers (6,636 sq mi). Its administrative center is the town of Nikolayevsk-on-Amur (which is not administratively a part of the district). Population: 9,942 (2010 census); 13,850 (2002 census); 19,683 (1989 Soviet census).

== Administrative and municipal status ==
Within the framework of administrative divisions, Nikolayevsky District is one of the seventeen in the krai. The town of Nikolayevsk-on-Amur serves as its administrative center, despite being incorporated separately as a town of krai significance—an administrative unit with the status equal to that of the districts.

As a municipal division, the district is incorporated as Nikolayevsky Municipal District, with the town of krai significance of Nikolayevsk-on-Amur being incorporated within it as Nikolayevsk-na-Amure Urban Settlement.
