= Nikolayevsk-on-Amur =

Town in Khabarovsk Krai, Russia

Nikolayevsk-on-Amur Николаевск-на-Амуре
- Town
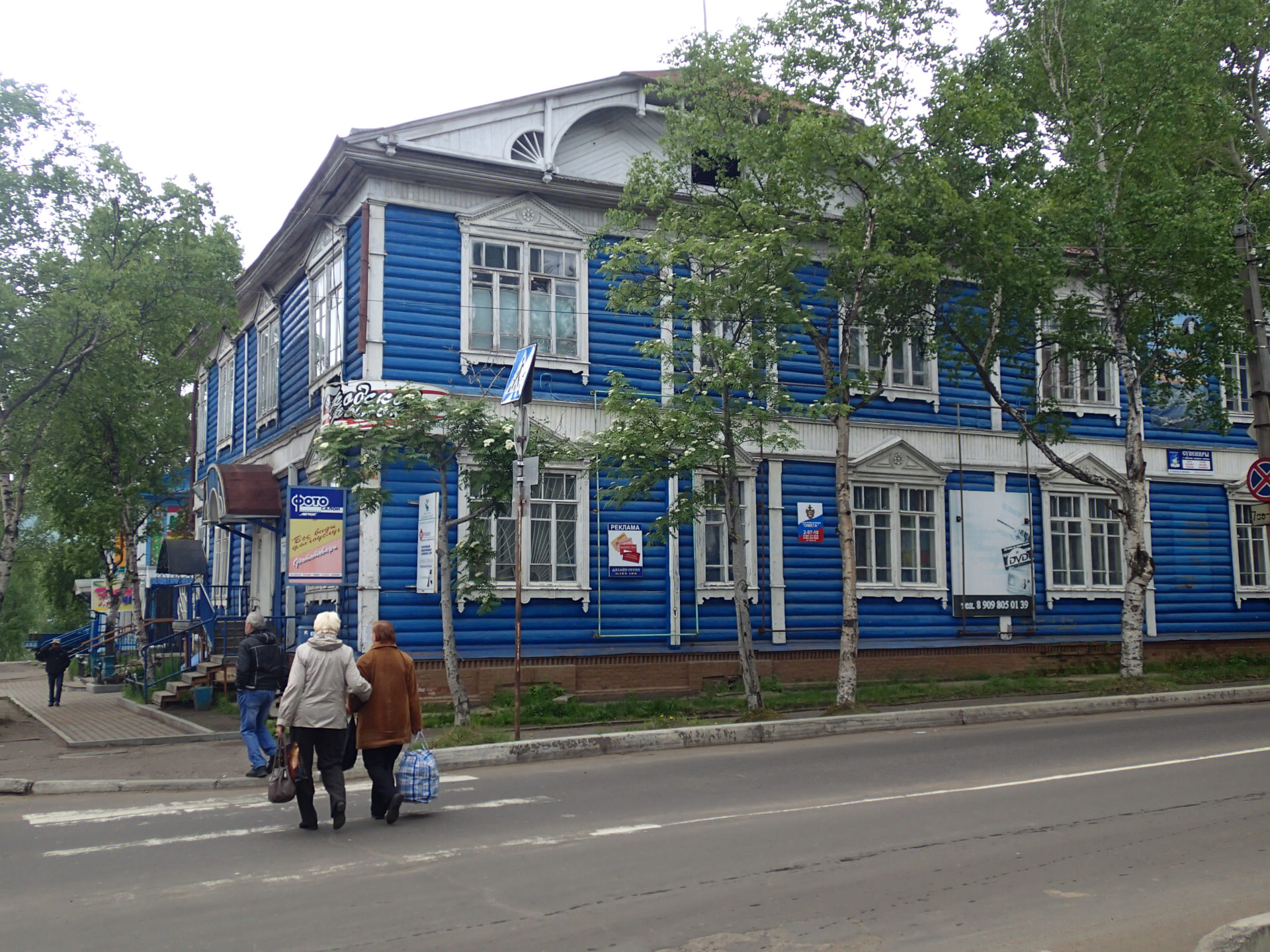

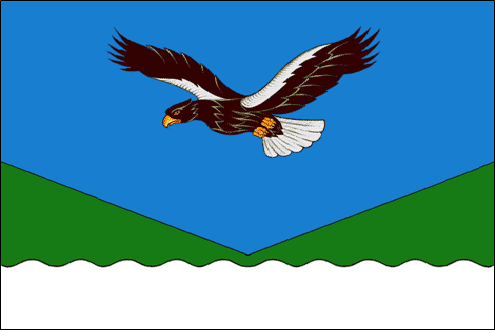
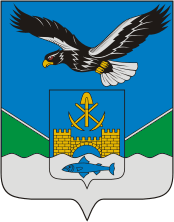
- Flag Coat of arms
- Interactive map of Nikolayevsk-on-Amur
- Location of Nikolayevsk-on-Amur Nikolayevsk-on-Amur (Khabarovsk Krai)
- Coordinates: 53°08′N 140°44′E
- Country: Russia
- Federal subject: Khabarovsk Krai
- Founded: 13 August 1850
- Town status since: 1856

Government
  - Head: Anton Leonov
- Elevation: 30 m (98 ft)

Population (2010 Census)
  - Total: 22,752
  - Estimate (2025): 17,471 (−23.2%)

Administrative status
  - Subordinated to: town of krai significance of Nikolayevsk-on-Amur
  - Capital of: town of krai significance of Nikolayevsk-on-Amur, Nikolayevsky District

Municipal status
  - Municipal district: Nikolayevsky Municipal District
  - Urban settlement: Nikolayevsk-na-Amure Urban Settlement
  - Capital of: Nikolayevsky Municipal District, Nikolayevsk-na-Amure Urban Settlement
- Time zone: UTC+10 (MSK+7)
- Postal code: 682460
- Dialing code: +7 42135
- OKTMO ID: 08631101001

Nikolayevsk-on-Amur (Russian: Никола́евск-на-Аму́ре, romanized: Nikoláyevsk-na-Amúrye) is a town in Khabarovsk Krai, Russia located on the Amur River close to its liman in the Pacific Ocean. Population: 17,815 (2024); 22,752 (2010 census); 28,492 (2002 census); 36,296 (1989 Soviet census).

== History ==
=== Medieval and early-modern history ===
In the late Middle Ages, the people living along the lower course of the Amur (Nivkh, Oroch, Evenki) were collectively known in China as the "wild Jurchen". The Yuan dynasty Mongols sent expeditions to this area with an eye toward using the region as a base for attack on Japan, or for defending against the Sakhalin Ainus. According to the History of Yuan, in 1264 the Nivkhs recognized the Mongol sovereignty. In 1263, the Mongols set up the "Command Post of the Marshal of the Eastern Campaign" near the modern settlement of Tyr, some 100 kilometers (62 mi) upstream from today's Nikolayevsk-on-Amur. At roughly the same time, a shrine was built on the Tyr Rock.

From 1411 to 1433, the Ming eunuch Yishiha, a man of Haixi Jurchen origin, led four large missions to win over the allegiance of the "Jurchen" tribes along the Sunggari and Amur Rivers. During this time, the Yongning Temple was constructed at Tyr, and stelae with inscriptions erected.

=== Russian period ===
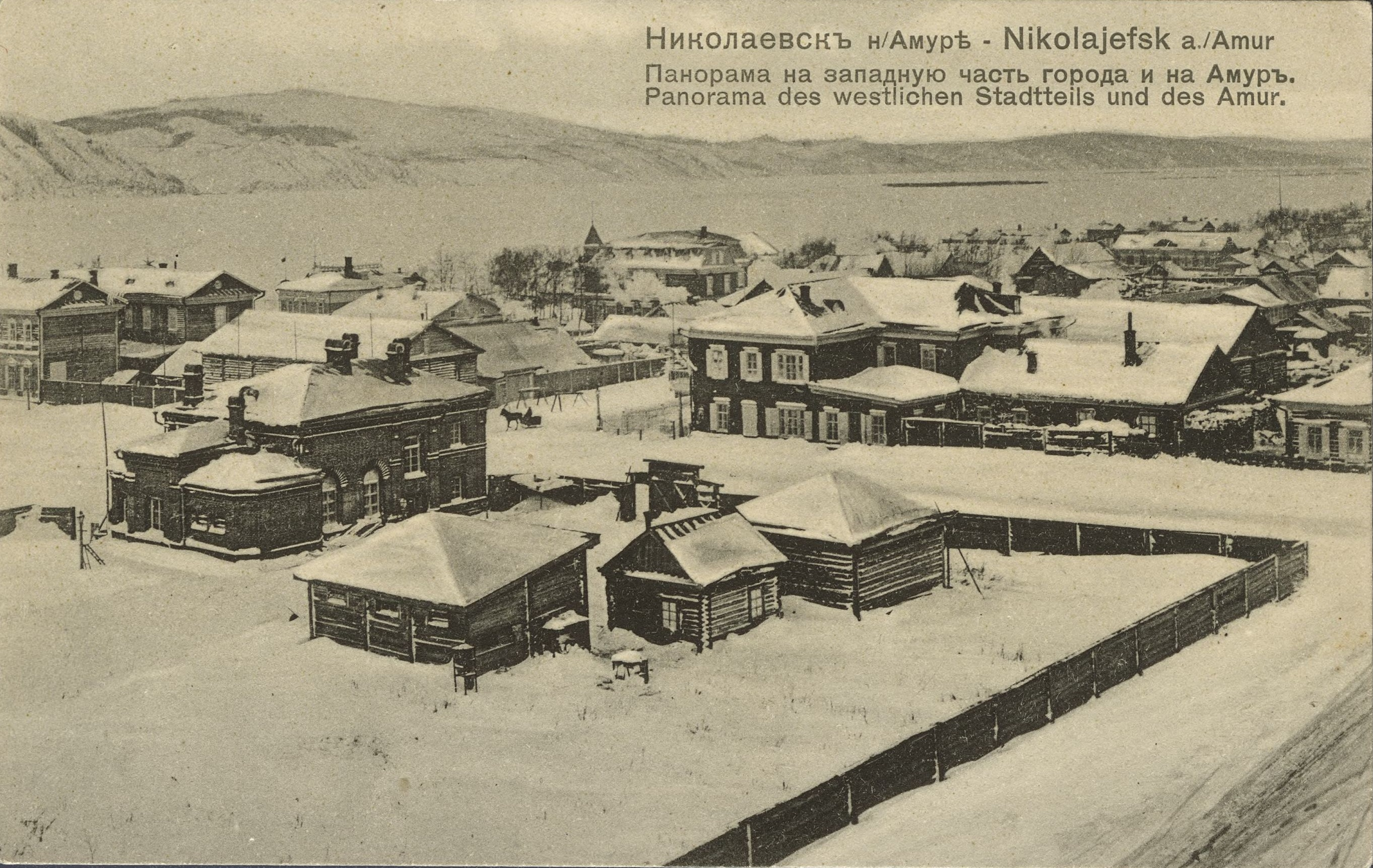
View of Nikolayevsk, ca. 1900

The Russian settlement, likely preceded by the Manchu village of Fuyori, was founded as Nikolayevsky Post by Gennady Nevelskoy on 13 August 1850 and named for Tsar Nicholas I.

The settlement quickly became one of the main economic centres on the Pacific coast of the Russian Empire. It became Russia's main Pacific harbour (replacing Petropavlovsk) in 1855 after the Siege of Petropavlovsk of 1854. It was granted town status and renamed Nikolayevsk-on-Amur in 1856, when Primorskaya Oblast was established. Admiral Vasily Zavoyko supervised the construction of a naval base in Nikolayevsk-on-Amur.

The town emerged as an important commercial harbour; however, due to navigational difficulties caused by the sandbanks in the Amur estuary and because sea ice made the harbour unusable for five months each year, the main Russian shipping activities in the Pacific transferred to the better situated Vladivostok in the early 1870s. The town remained the administrative centre of this region until 1880, when the governor relocated to Khabarovsk. Anton Chekhov, visiting the town on his journey to Sakhalin in 1890, noted its rapid depopulation, although this trend slowed somewhat in the late 1890s with the discovery of gold and the establishment of salmon fisheries.

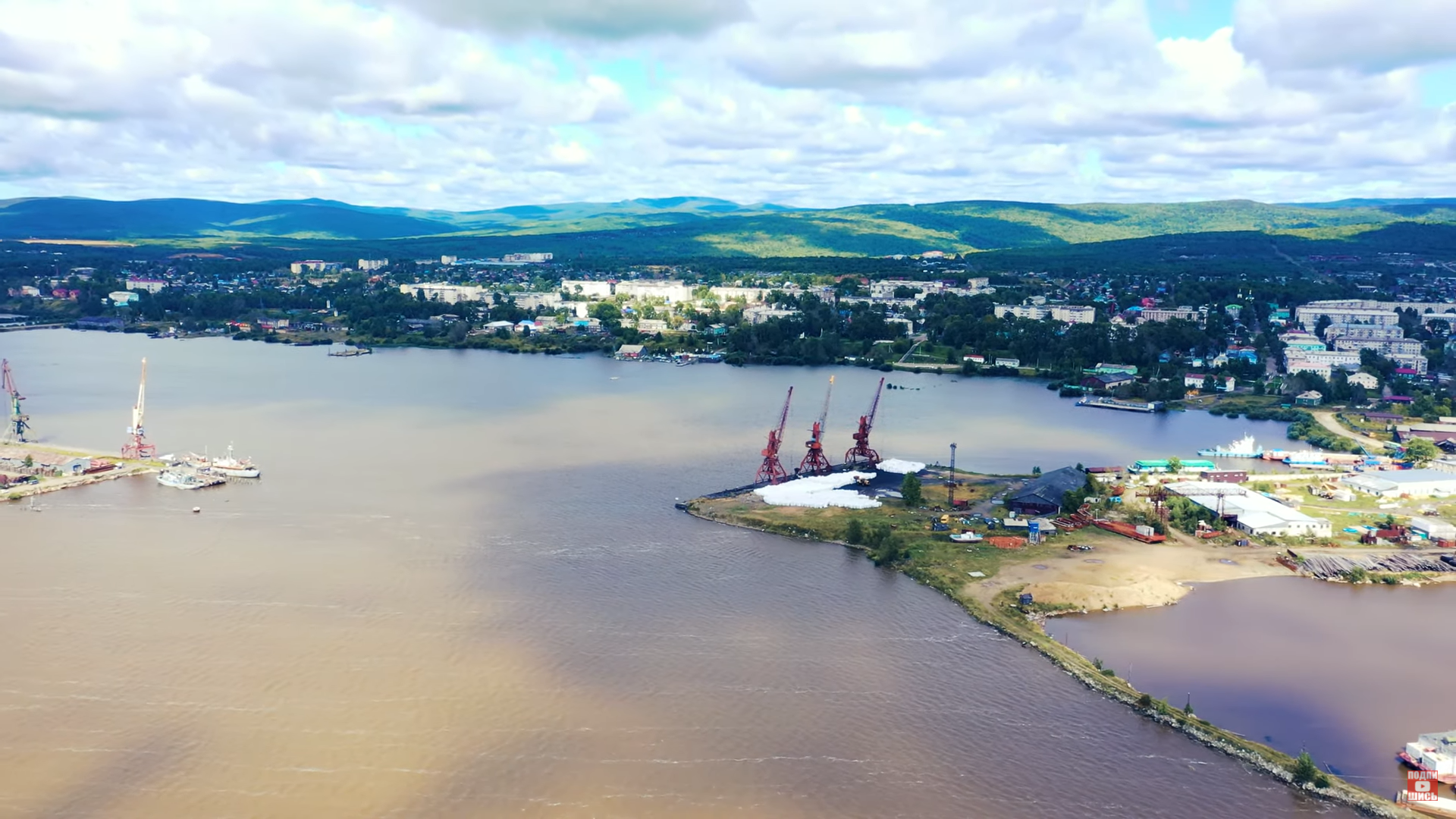
General view of the city and the port

During the Russian Civil War of 1917–1922 the town's population plummeted from 15,000 to 2,000, as a local Soviet partisan leader, Yakov Tryapitsyn, later executed by the same Bolsheviks he was supposed to be aligned with to salvage the relationship with Japan, razed the entire town to the ground and massacred the minority Japanese population along with most of the Russian population. In response to this event, Northern Sakhalin was briefly occupied by Japan between 1920 and 1925. During this time, the town was called Nikō (尼港町, Nikō-chō).

Around 1940 a prison camp of the gulag system was located in the town.

From 1932 to 1945 – before, during and after the Great Terror – the bodies of executed inhabitants of the Far Eastern Krai (after October 1938, the Khabarovsk Krai) were buried on the outskirts of Nikolayevsk-na-Amure near the old city cemetery. In 2007 a monument was raised there to executed city inhabitants.

Like many other places in the Russian Far East, the town has seen a drop in population since the dissolution of the Soviet Union, dropping from 36,296 inhabitants recorded in the 1989 Census, to 22,772 in 2010.

== Geography ==
The town is situated on the left bank of the Amur River, 80 kilometers (50 mi) from where it flows into the Amur estuary, 977 kilometers (607 mi) north of Khabarovsk and 582 kilometers (362 mi) from the Komsomolsk-on-Amur railway station. It is the closest significant settlement to the Strait of Tartary separating the mainland from Sakhalin.

=== Climate ===
Nikolayevsk-on-Amur has a borderline humid continental climate (Köppen Dfb), almost cold enough to be a subarctic climate (Dfc). Precipitation is not as low in the winter as over most of Siberia since the coast is on the fringe of influence from the Aleutian Low. The near-maritime location only marginally—by 5 °C (9.0 °F)—moderates the winters compared to interior Siberia, but makes the summers noticeably cool (especially in May and June) though the Oyashio fogs are less prevalent than on Sakhalin itself and sunshine hours therefore rather longer.

Climate data for Nikolayevsk-on-Amur (1991–2020, extremes 1881–present)
Month	Jan	Feb	Mar	Apr	May	Jun	Jul	Aug	Sep	Oct	Nov	Dec	Year
Record high °C (°F)	0.3 (32.5)	5.7 (42.3)	12.7 (54.9)	19.6 (67.3)	31.7 (89.1)	34.3 (93.7)	34.6 (94.3)	35.3 (95.5)	28.9 (84.0)	22.5 (72.5)	11.4 (52.5)	2.8 (37.0)	35.3 (95.5)
Mean maximum °C (°F)	−5.0 (23.0)	−5.2 (22.6)	3.4 (38.1)	10.2 (50.4)	21.8 (71.2)	27.9 (82.2)	28.8 (83.8)	28.6 (83.5)	24.4 (75.9)	16.1 (61.0)	4.7 (40.5)	−3.1 (26.4)	30.6 (87.1)
Mean daily maximum °C (°F)	−16.6 (2.1)	−13.6 (7.5)	−5.2 (22.6)	2.7 (36.9)	10.8 (51.4)	18.4 (65.1)	21.6 (70.9)	21.6 (70.9)	16.6 (61.9)	7.0 (44.6)	−5.5 (22.1)	−15.1 (4.8)	3.6 (38.4)
Daily mean °C (°F)	−21.0 (−5.8)	−19.1 (−2.4)	−11.4 (11.5)	−2.3 (27.9)	5.3 (41.5)	12.7 (54.9)	16.6 (61.9)	16.3 (61.3)	10.8 (51.4)	2.3 (36.1)	−9.7 (14.5)	−19.2 (−2.6)	−1.6 (29.2)
Mean daily minimum °C (°F)	−24.8 (−12.6)	−23.8 (−10.8)	−16.8 (1.8)	−6.5 (20.3)	1.1 (34.0)	7.9 (46.2)	12.5 (54.5)	12.0 (53.6)	6.3 (43.3)	−1.4 (29.5)	−13.5 (7.7)	−22.9 (−9.2)	−5.8 (21.5)
Mean minimum °C (°F)	−34.1 (−29.4)	−32.6 (−26.7)	−27.0 (−16.6)	−17.2 (1.0)	−4.3 (24.3)	1.7 (35.1)	6.0 (42.8)	5.6 (42.1)	−1.6 (29.1)	−9.9 (14.2)	−25.7 (−14.3)	−32.5 (−26.5)	−35.6 (−32.1)
Record low °C (°F)	−47.2 (−53.0)	−45.9 (−50.6)	−37.6 (−35.7)	−28.8 (−19.8)	−11.9 (10.6)	−3.8 (25.2)	1.3 (34.3)	0.6 (33.1)	−6.0 (21.2)	−25.1 (−13.2)	−34.0 (−29.2)	−44.2 (−47.6)	−47.2 (−53.0)
Average precipitation mm (inches)	47.1 (1.85)	27.7 (1.09)	36.8 (1.45)	36.6 (1.44)	52.0 (2.05)	53.1 (2.09)	56.8 (2.24)	84.3 (3.32)	79.8 (3.14)	79.1 (3.11)	61.1 (2.41)	57.1 (2.25)	671.5 (26.44)
Average rainy days	0	0	0.5	5	15	14	15	18	19	15	2	0	104
Average snowy days	17	17	18	16	9	0.1	0	0	0	12	21	19	129
Average relative humidity (%)	76	76	74	76	77	77	81	83	82	79	79	79	79
Mean monthly sunshine hours	129	160	232	209	233	234	238	204	184	143	132	94	2,192
Source 1: pogoda.ru.net
Source 2: NOAA (sun 1961–1990) Infoclimat

== Administrative and municipal status ==
Within the framework of administrative divisions, Nikolayevsk-on-Amur serves as the administrative center of Nikolayevsky District, even though it is not a part of it. As an administrative division, it is incorporated separately as the town of krai significance of Nikolayevsk-na-Amure—an administrative unit with the status equal to that of the districts. As a municipal division, the town of krai significance of Nikolayevsk-na-Amure is incorporated within Nikolayevsky Municipal District as Nikolayevsk-na-Amure Urban Settlement.

== Economy ==
Fishing and fish processing are the main industries of the town, along with ship maintenance and some agricultural production in the surrounding area.

== Transportation ==
Nikolayevsk-on-Amur has no land transport connections. Traffic to and from the town enters via the port on the Amur, or the small airport, namely Nikolayevsk-on-Amur Airport (IATA: NLI), which is home to Nikolaevsk-Na-Amure Air Enterprise.
