= Sovetsko-Gavansky District =

Sovetsko-Gavansky District Советско-Гаванский район (Russian)
- District
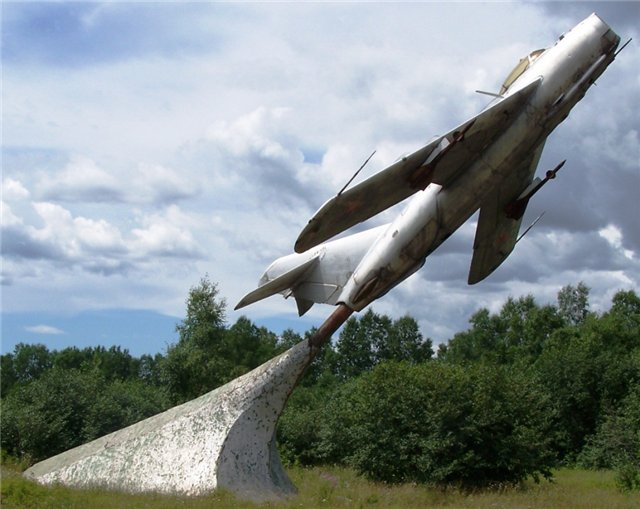
- MIG-17 Monument, Sovetsko-Gavansky District

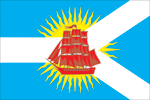
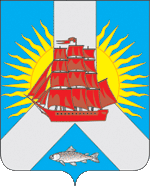
- Flag Coat of arms
- Location of Sovetsko-Gavansky District in Khabarovsk Krai
- Coordinates: 48°58′00″N 140°17′00″E
- Country: Russia
- Federal subject: Khabarovsk Krai
- Established: 1925
- Administrative center: Sovetskaya Gavan

Area
  - Total: 15,534 km^{2} (5,998 sq mi)

Population (2010 Census)
  - Total: 15,794
  - Density: 1.0167/km^{2} (2.6333/sq mi)
  - Urban: 94.9%
  - Rural: 5.1%

Administrative structure
  - Inhabited localities: 3 urban-type settlements, 5 rural localities

Municipal structure
  - Municipally incorporated as: Sovetsko-Gavansky Municipal District
  - Municipal divisions: 4 urban settlements, 1 rural settlements
- Time zone: UTC+10 (MSK+7)
- OKTMO ID: 08642000
- Website: http://sovgavan-rayon.ru/

Sovetsko-Gavansky District (Russian: Сове́тско-Га́ванский райо́н) is an administrative and municipal district (raion), one of the seventeen in Khabarovsk Krai, Russia. It is located in the southeast of the krai. The area of the district is 15,534 square kilometers (5,998 sq mi). Its administrative center is the town of Sovetskaya Gavan (which is not administratively a part of the district). Population: 15,794 (2010 census); 16,602 (2002 census); 24,302 (1989 Soviet census).

== Administrative and municipal status ==
Within the framework of administrative divisions, Sovetsko-Gavansky District is one of the seventeen in the krai. The town of Sovetskaya Gavan serves as its administrative center, despite being incorporated separately as a town of krai significance—an administrative unit with the status equal to that of the districts.

As a municipal division, the district is incorporated as Sovetsko-Gavansky Municipal District, with the town of krai significance of Sovetskaya Gavan being incorporated within it as Sovetskaya Gavan Urban Settlement.
