= Khabarovsk Krai =

First-level administrative division of Russia

Khabarovsk Krai Хабаровский край (Russian)
- Krai
- Flag Coat of arms

- Coordinates: 54°48′N 136°50′E
- Country: Russia
- Federal district: Far Eastern
- Economic region: Far Eastern
- Established: 20 October 1938
- Administrative center (and largest city): Khabarovsk

Government
  - Body: Legislative Duma
  - Governor: Dmitry Demeshin

Area
  - Total: 787,633 km^{2} (304,107 sq mi)
  - Rank: 3rd

Population (2021 census)
  - Total: 1,292,944
  - Estimate (2018): 1,328,302
  - Rank: 34th
  - Density: 1.64156/km^{2} (4.25161/sq mi)
  - Urban: 83.4%
  - Rural: 16.6%

GDP (nominal, 2024)
  - Total: ₽1.26 trillion (US$14.81 billion)
  - Per capita: ₽985,370 (US$11,562.53)
- Time zone: UTC+10 (MSK+7)
- ISO 3166 code: RU-KHA
- License plates: 27
- OKTMO ID: 08000000
- Official languages: Russian
- Website: http://www.khabkrai.ru

Khabarovsk Krai (Note: Russian: Хабаровский край, romanized: Khabarovskiy kray, IPA: [xɐˈbarəfskʲɪj kraj]) is a federal subject (a krai) of Russia. It is located in the Russian Far East and is administratively part of the Far Eastern Federal District. The administrative centre and largest city of the krai is the city of Khabarovsk, which is home to roughly half of the krai's population and the largest city in the Russian Far East (just ahead of Vladivostok). Khabarovsk Krai is the third-largest federal subject by area, and had a population of 1,343,869 as of 2010.

Being dominated by the Siberian High winter cold, the continental climates of the krai see extreme freezing for an area adjacent to the sea near the mid-latitudes, but also warm summers in the interior. The southern region lies mostly in the basin of the lower Amur River, with the mouth of the river located at Nikolaevsk-on-Amur draining into the Strait of Tartary, which separates Khabarovsk Krai from the island of Sakhalin. The north occupies a vast mountainous area along the coastline of the Sea of Okhotsk, a marginal sea of the Pacific Ocean. Khabarovsk Krai is bordered by Magadan Oblast to the north; Amur Oblast, Jewish Autonomous Oblast, and the Sakha Republic to the west; Primorsky Krai to the south; and Sakhalin Oblast to the east.

The population consists of mostly ethnic Russians, but indigenous people of the area are numerous, such as the Tungusic peoples (Evenks, Negidals, Ulchs, Nanai, Oroch, Udege), Amur Nivkhs, and Ainu.

== Geography ==
Khabarovsk Krai shares its borders with Magadan Oblast in the north; with the Sakha Republic and Amur Oblast in the west; with the Jewish Autonomous Oblast, China (Heilongjiang), and Primorsky Krai in the south; and is limited by the Sea of Okhotsk in the east. In terms of area, it is the third-largest federal subject within Russia, behind only the Sakha Republic and Krasnoyarsk Krai. Major islands include the Shantar Islands.

Taiga and tundra in the north, swampy forest in the central depression, and deciduous forest in the south are the natural vegetation in the area. The main rivers are the Amur, Amgun, Uda, and Tugur, among others. There are also lakes such as Bokon, Bolon, Chukchagir, Evoron, Kizi, Khummi, Orel, and Udyl, among others.

Khabarovsk Krai has a severely continental climate with its northern areas being subarctic with stronger maritime summer moderation in the north. In its southerly areas, especially inland, annual swings are extremely strong, with Khabarovsk itself having hot, wet, and humid summers which rapidly transform into severely cold and long winters, where temperatures hardly ever go above freezing. This is because of the influence of the East Asian monsoon in summer and the bitterly cold Siberian High in winter. The second-largest city of Komsomolsk-on-Amur has even more violent temperature swings than Khabarovsk, with winter average lows below −30 °C (−22 °F), but in spite of this, avoiding being subarctic because of the significant heat in summer.

The main mountain ranges in the region are the Bureya Range, the Badzhal Range (highest point 2,221 metres (7,287 ft) high, the Gora Ulun), the Yam-Alin, the Dusse-Alin, the Sikhote-Alin, the Dzhugdzhur Mountains, the Kondyor Massif, as well as a small section of the Suntar-Khayata Range, the Yudoma-Maya Highlands, and the Sette-Daban in the western border regions. The highest point is 2,933 metres (9,623 ft) high, Berill Mountain.

There are a number of peninsulas along the krai's extensive coast, the main ones being (north to south) the Lisyansky Peninsula, Nurki Peninsula, Tugurskiy Peninsula, and the Tokhareu Peninsula.

The main islands of Khabarovsk Krai (north to south) are Malminskiye Island, the Shantar Islands, Menshikov Island, Reyneke Island (Sea of Okhotsk), Chkalov Island, Baydukov Island, and the Chastye Islands. The island of Sakhalin (Russia's largest) is administered separately as Sakhalin Oblast, along with the Kuril Islands.

The charts below detail climate averages from various locations in the krai. Khabarovsk is set near the Chinese border at a lower latitude far inland, while Komsomolsk-on-Amur being further downstream on the Amur river at a higher latitude. Sovetskaya Gavan and Okhotsk are coastal settlements in the deep south and far north, respectively.

Climate data for Khabarovsk (1991–2020, extremes 1878–2023)
Month	Jan	Feb	Mar	Apr	May	Jun	Jul	Aug	Sep	Oct	Nov	Dec	Year
Record high °C (°F)	0.6 (33.1)	6.3 (43.3)	17.0 (62.6)	28.6 (83.5)	31.5 (88.7)	36.4 (97.5)	35.7 (96.3)	35.6 (96.1)	29.8 (85.6)	26.4 (79.5)	15.5 (59.9)	6.6 (43.9)	36.4 (97.5)
Mean daily maximum °C (°F)	−14.9 (5.2)	−9.9 (14.2)	−1.0 (30.2)	10.5 (50.9)	19.2 (66.6)	23.8 (74.8)	26.8 (80.2)	24.9 (76.8)	19.7 (67.5)	10.6 (51.1)	−2.8 (27.0)	−13.6 (7.5)	7.8 (46.0)
Daily mean °C (°F)	−19.2 (−2.6)	−14.9 (5.2)	−5.9 (21.4)	4.8 (40.6)	12.9 (55.2)	18.0 (64.4)	21.4 (70.5)	19.9 (67.8)	14.1 (57.4)	5.4 (41.7)	−6.9 (19.6)	−17.4 (0.7)	2.7 (36.9)
Mean daily minimum °C (°F)	−23.1 (−9.6)	−19.6 (−3.3)	−10.7 (12.7)	−0.1 (31.8)	7.3 (45.1)	12.8 (55.0)	16.8 (62.2)	15.7 (60.3)	9.4 (48.9)	1.0 (33.8)	−10.4 (13.3)	−20.9 (−5.6)	−1.8 (28.8)
Record low °C (°F)	−40.0 (−40.0)	−35.1 (−31.2)	−28.9 (−20.0)	−15.1 (4.8)	−3.1 (26.4)	2.2 (36.0)	6.8 (44.2)	4.9 (40.8)	−3.3 (26.1)	−15.6 (3.9)	−27.7 (−17.9)	−38.1 (−36.6)	−40.0 (−40.0)
Average precipitation mm (inches)	13 (0.5)	12 (0.5)	22 (0.9)	37 (1.5)	70 (2.8)	84 (3.3)	137 (5.4)	143 (5.6)	85 (3.3)	48 (1.9)	26 (1.0)	19 (0.7)	696 (27.4)
Average extreme snow depth cm (inches)	14 (5.5)	16 (6.3)	12 (4.7)	1 (0.4)	0 (0)	0 (0)	0 (0)	0 (0)	0 (0)	1 (0.4)	5 (2.0)	10 (3.9)	16 (6.3)
Average rainy days	0	0	1	10	16	15	15	17	15	11	2	0	102
Average snowy days	14	11	11	6	1	0	0	0	0.1	4	12	14	73
Average relative humidity (%)	75	72	68	63	65	74	79	83	78	67	69	73	72
Mean monthly sunshine hours	147	181	231	213	242	262	248	217	212	189	159	145	2,446
Source 1: Pogoda.ru.net
Source 2: NOAA (sun, 1961–1990)

Climate data for Komsomolsk-on-Amur
Month	Jan	Feb	Mar	Apr	May	Jun	Jul	Aug	Sep	Oct	Nov	Dec	Year
Record high °C (°F)	0.7 (33.3)	0.0 (32.0)	13.6 (56.5)	23.9 (75.0)	31.0 (87.8)	33.2 (91.8)	36.2 (97.2)	38.0 (100.4)	30.0 (86.0)	20.5 (68.9)	8.3 (46.9)	1.0 (33.8)	38.0 (100.4)
Mean daily maximum °C (°F)	−19.6 (−3.3)	−13.9 (7.0)	−4.0 (24.8)	7.5 (45.5)	16.1 (61.0)	22.8 (73.0)	25.1 (77.2)	23.4 (74.1)	17.1 (62.8)	7.4 (45.3)	−6.4 (20.5)	−17.2 (1.0)	4.6 (40.3)
Daily mean °C (°F)	−24.7 (−12.5)	−19.8 (−3.6)	−9.5 (14.9)	2.3 (36.1)	10.4 (50.7)	17.3 (63.1)	20.3 (68.5)	18.5 (65.3)	11.9 (53.4)	2.5 (36.5)	−10.5 (13.1)	−21.8 (−7.2)	−0.6 (30.9)
Mean daily minimum °C (°F)	−30.8 (−23.4)	−27.2 (−17.0)	−17.1 (1.2)	−3.4 (25.9)	3.7 (38.7)	10.8 (51.4)	15.2 (59.4)	13.5 (56.3)	6.4 (43.5)	−2.9 (26.8)	−16.1 (3.0)	−27.4 (−17.3)	−6.6 (20.1)
Record low °C (°F)	−47.0 (−52.6)	−42.0 (−43.6)	−33.9 (−29.0)	−20.8 (−5.4)	−7.5 (18.5)	−2.2 (28.0)	0.0 (32.0)	−8.9 (16.0)	−6.0 (21.2)	−22.0 (−7.6)	−34.0 (−29.2)	−42.0 (−43.6)	−47.0 (−52.6)
Average precipitation mm (inches)	30 (1.2)	19 (0.7)	30 (1.2)	43 (1.7)	63 (2.5)	65 (2.6)	95 (3.7)	110 (4.3)	74 (2.9)	62 (2.4)	49 (1.9)	32 (1.3)	672 (26.4)
Average precipitation days	14	12	13	15	15	13	15	14	14	13	16	15	169
Average rainy days	0	0	1	7	14	13	15	14	14	8	1	0	87
Average snowy days	14	12	13	11	3	0	0	0	0	8	15	15	91
Source 1: climatebase.ru
Source 2: Weatherbase

Climate data for Sovetskaya Gavan (1914–2012)
Month	Jan	Feb	Mar	Apr	May	Jun	Jul	Aug	Sep	Oct	Nov	Dec	Year
Record high °C (°F)	2.6 (36.7)	12.2 (54.0)	18.9 (66.0)	25.1 (77.2)	31.8 (89.2)	35.1 (95.2)	34.2 (93.6)	35.8 (96.4)	30.2 (86.4)	26.8 (80.2)	16.5 (61.7)	9.4 (48.9)	35.8 (96.4)
Mean daily maximum °C (°F)	−11.4 (11.5)	−8.3 (17.1)	−1.8 (28.8)	5.6 (42.1)	11.6 (52.9)	16.8 (62.2)	20.5 (68.9)	21.9 (71.4)	18.2 (64.8)	10.9 (51.6)	0.0 (32.0)	−8.7 (16.3)	6.3 (43.3)
Daily mean °C (°F)	−16.8 (1.8)	−14.2 (6.4)	−7.4 (18.7)	1.1 (34.0)	6.6 (43.9)	11.5 (52.7)	15.6 (60.1)	17.4 (63.3)	13.3 (55.9)	6.0 (42.8)	−4.7 (23.5)	−13.5 (7.7)	1.3 (34.3)
Mean daily minimum °C (°F)	−22.2 (−8.0)	−20.1 (−4.2)	−12.9 (8.8)	−3.5 (25.7)	1.5 (34.7)	6.2 (43.2)	10.7 (51.3)	12.9 (55.2)	8.4 (47.1)	1.0 (33.8)	−9.3 (15.3)	−18.3 (−0.9)	−3.8 (25.2)
Record low °C (°F)	−40.0 (−40.0)	−38.6 (−37.5)	−30.3 (−22.5)	−26.4 (−15.5)	−9.5 (14.9)	−3.0 (26.6)	2.4 (36.3)	4.0 (39.2)	−1.7 (28.9)	−14.7 (5.5)	−31.3 (−24.3)	−38.4 (−37.1)	−40.0 (−40.0)
Average precipitation mm (inches)	19.9 (0.78)	20.7 (0.81)	42.9 (1.69)	47.5 (1.87)	73.9 (2.91)	70.1 (2.76)	82.1 (3.23)	109.6 (4.31)	117.2 (4.61)	87.7 (3.45)	43.4 (1.71)	32.7 (1.29)	747.7 (29.42)
Average precipitation days	6.8	7.0	9.6	10.3	13.2	12.9	13.4	14.7	13.1	9.2	6.1	6.6	122.9

Climate data for Okhotsk (1991−2020 normals, extremes 1891–present)
Month	Jan	Feb	Mar	Apr	May	Jun	Jul	Aug	Sep	Oct	Nov	Dec	Year
Record high °C (°F)	5.5 (41.9)	2.0 (35.6)	6.4 (43.5)	16.0 (60.8)	26.2 (79.2)	31.3 (88.3)	31.0 (87.8)	32.1 (89.8)	24.8 (76.6)	15.7 (60.3)	6.2 (43.2)	2.8 (37.0)	32.1 (89.8)
Mean daily maximum °C (°F)	−16.8 (1.8)	−14.2 (6.4)	−6.3 (20.7)	0.4 (32.7)	6.2 (43.2)	11.4 (52.5)	15.7 (60.3)	17.1 (62.8)	12.9 (55.2)	2.7 (36.9)	−9.7 (14.5)	−16.4 (2.5)	0.3 (32.5)
Daily mean °C (°F)	−19.9 (−3.8)	−18.5 (−1.3)	−12.1 (10.2)	−3.8 (25.2)	2.6 (36.7)	8.1 (46.6)	12.9 (55.2)	13.7 (56.7)	8.9 (48.0)	−1.2 (29.8)	−12.7 (9.1)	−19.0 (−2.2)	−3.4 (25.9)
Mean daily minimum °C (°F)	−22.7 (−8.9)	−22.2 (−8.0)	−17.8 (0.0)	−8.2 (17.2)	−0.2 (31.6)	5.7 (42.3)	10.6 (51.1)	10.6 (51.1)	4.9 (40.8)	−4.6 (23.7)	−15.3 (4.5)	−21.4 (−6.5)	−6.7 (19.9)
Record low °C (°F)	−41.3 (−42.3)	−45.7 (−50.3)	−36.9 (−34.4)	−29.2 (−20.6)	−16.0 (3.2)	−2.6 (27.3)	1.7 (35.1)	−0.1 (31.8)	−6.6 (20.1)	−27.5 (−17.5)	−37.4 (−35.3)	−37.7 (−35.9)	−45.7 (−50.3)
Average precipitation mm (inches)	15 (0.6)	7 (0.3)	16 (0.6)	24 (0.9)	40 (1.6)	55 (2.2)	85 (3.3)	94 (3.7)	92 (3.6)	66 (2.6)	32 (1.3)	14 (0.6)	540 (21.3)
Average rainy days	0.1	0.2	0.3	2	11	16	18	15	16	7	1	0.2	87
Average snowy days	9	9	11	13	10	0.4	0	0	0.3	9	11	8	81
Average relative humidity (%)	63	63	68	77	84	88	89	86	80	70	66	63	75
Mean monthly sunshine hours	86	147	241	230	195	200	179	182	172	157	107	54	1,950
Source 1: Pogoda.ru.net
Source 2: NOAA (sun 1961–1990)

== History ==
According to various Chinese and Korean records, the southern part of Khabarovsk Krai was originally occupied by one of the five semi-nomadic Shiwei, the Bo Shiwei tribes, and the Black Water Mohe tribes living, respectively, on the west and the east of the Bureya and the Lesser Khingan ranges.

In 1643, Vassili Poyarkov's boats descended the Amur, returning to Yakutsk by the Sea of Okhotsk and the Aldan River, and in 1649–1650, Yerofey Khabarov occupied the banks of the Amur. The resistance of the Chinese, however, obliged the Cossacks to quit their forts, and by the Treaty of Nerchinsk (1689), Russia abandoned its advance into the basin of the river.

Although the Russians were thus deprived of the right to navigate the Amur River, the territorial claim over the lower courses of the river was not settled in the Treaty of Nerchinsk of 1689. The area between the Uda River and the Greater Khingan mountain range (i.e. most of Lower Amuria) was left undemarcated and the Sino-Russian border was allowed to fluctuate.

Later in the nineteenth century, Nikolay Muravyov conducted an aggressive policy with China by claiming that the lower reaches of the Amur River belonged to Russia. In 1852, a Russian military expedition under Muravyov explored the Amur, and by 1857, a chain of Russian Cossacks and peasants had been settled along the whole course of the river. In 1858, in the Treaty of Aigun, China recognized the Amur River downstream as far as the Ussuri River as the boundary between Russia and the Qing Empire, and granted Russia free access to the Pacific Ocean. The Sino-Russian border was later further delineated in the Treaty of Peking of 1860 when the Ussuri Territory (the Maritime Territory), which was previously a joint possession, became Russian.

Khabarovsk Krai was established on 20 October 1938, when the Far Eastern Krai was split into the Khabarovsk and Primorsky Krais. Kamchatka Oblast, which was originally subordinated to the Far Eastern Krai, fell under the Jurisdiction of Khabarovsk Krai, along with its two National Okrugs, Chukotka and Koryak. In 1947, the northern part of Sakhalin was removed from the Krai to join the southern part and form Sakhalin Oblast. In 1948, parts of its southwestern territories were removed from the Krai to form Amur Oblast. In 1953, Magadan Oblast was established from the northern parts of the Krai and was given jurisdiction over Chukotka National Okrug, which was originally under the jurisdiction of Kamchatka oblast. In 1956, Kamchatka Oblast became its own region and took Koryak National Okrug with it. The Krai took its modern form in 1991, just before the USSR's collapse when the Jewish Autonomous Oblast was separated from its jurisdiction and made into a direct federal subject of Russia. On 24 April 1996, Khabarovsk signed a power-sharing agreement with the federal government, granting it autonomy. This agreement would be abolished on 12 August 2002.

== Politics ==
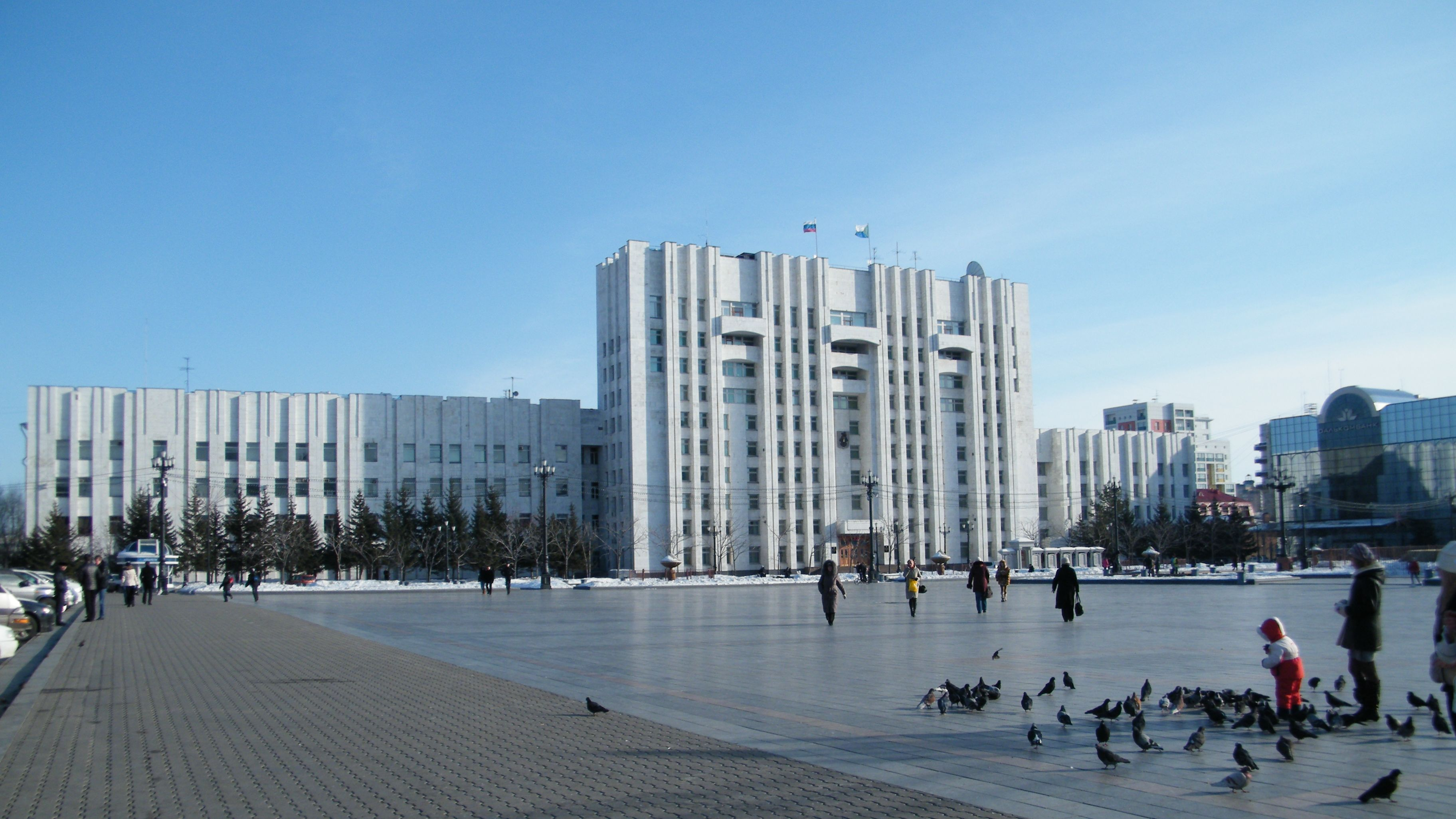
Khabarovsk Krai Administration building

During the Soviet period, the high authority in the oblast was shared between three persons: The first secretary of the Khabarovsk CPSU Committee (who, in reality, had the biggest authority), the chairman of the oblast Soviet (legislative power), and the Chairman of the oblast Executive Committee (executive power). Since 1991, CPSU lost all the power, and the head of the Oblast administration, and eventually the governor, was appointed/elected alongside elected regional parliament.

The Charter of Khabarovsk Krai is the fundamental law of the krai. The Legislative Duma of Khabarovsk Krai is the regional standing legislative (representative) body. The Legislative Duma exercises its authority by passing laws, resolutions, and other legal acts and by supervising the implementation and observance of the laws and other legal acts passed by it. The highest executive body is the Krai Government, which includes territorial executive bodies, such as district administrations, committees, and commissions that facilitate development and run the day to day matters of the province. The Krai Administration supports the activities of the Governor, who is the highest official and acts as guarantor of the observance of the Charter in accordance with the Constitution of Russia.

On 9 July 2020, the governor of the region, Sergei Furgal, was arrested and flown to Moscow. The 2020 Khabarovsk Krai protests began on 11 July 2020, in support of Furgal.

== Economy ==
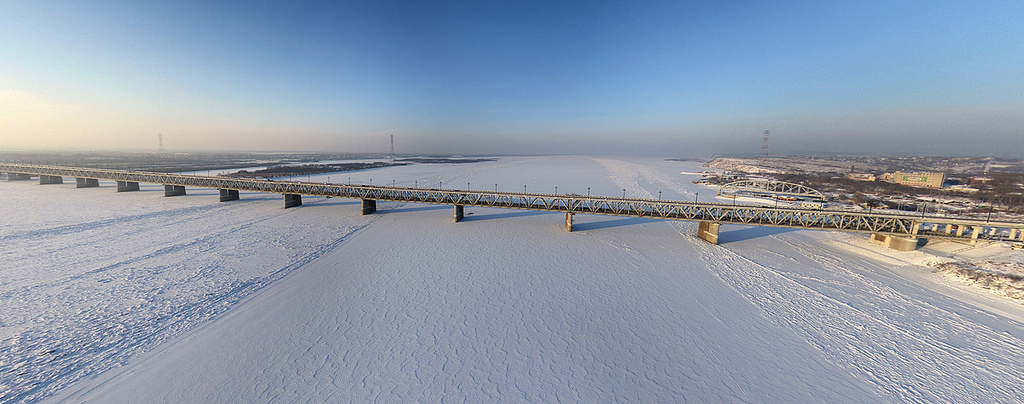
Bridge over the Amur River in Khabarovsk

Khabarovsk Krai is the most industrialized territory of the Far East of Russia, producing 30% of the total industrial products in the Far Eastern Economic Region.

=== Heavy industry ===
The machine construction industry consists primarily of a highly developed military–industrial complex of large-scale aircraft- and shipbuilding enterprises. The Komsomolsk-on-Amur Aircraft Production Association is currently among the krai's most successful enterprises, and for years has been the largest taxpayer of the territory. Other major industries include timber-working and fishing, along with metallurgy in the main cities. Komsomolsk-on-Amur is the iron and steel centre of the Far East; a pipeline from northern Sakhalin supplies the petroleum-refining industry in the city of Khabarovsk. In the Amur basin, there is also some cultivation of wheat and soybeans. The administrative centre, Khabarovsk, is at the junction of the Amur River and the Trans-Siberian Railway.

=== Mining ===
The region's mineral resources are relatively underdeveloped. Khabarovsk Krai contains large gold mining operations (Highland Gold, Polus Gold), a major but low-grade copper deposit being explored by IG Integro Group, and a world-class tin district which was a major contributor to the Soviet industrial complex and is currently being revitalised by Far Eastern Tin (Festivalnoye mine) and by Sable Tin Resources, which is developing the Sable Tin Deposit (Sobolinoye), a large high-grade deposit, 25 km from Solnechny town.

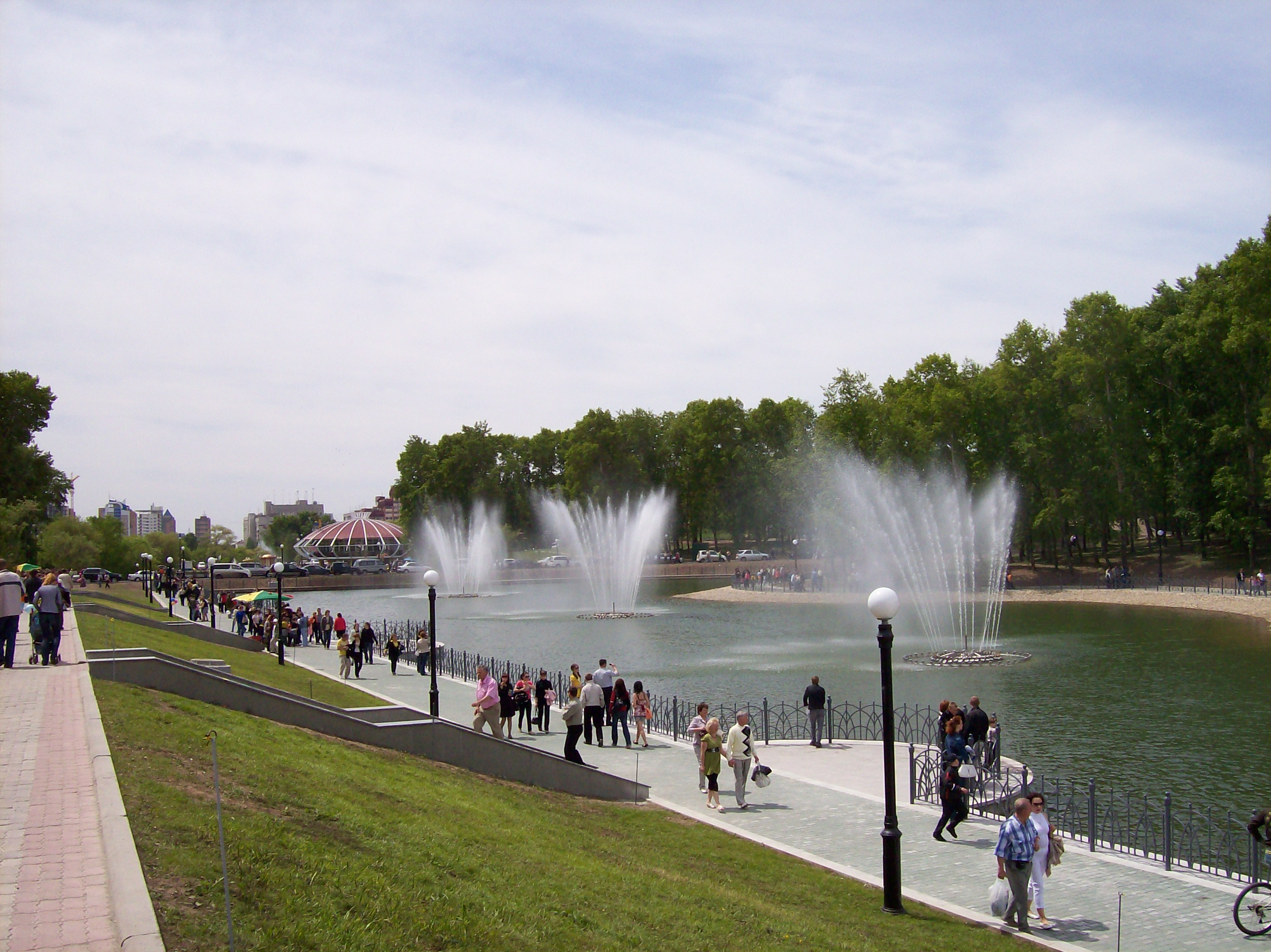
Khabarovsk city ponds on Ussuriysky Boulevard

== Demographics ==
Historical population
Year	Pop.	±%
1926	184,700	—
1939	657,400	+255.9%
1959	979,679	+49.0%
1970	1,173,458	+19.8%
1979	1,369,277	+16.7%
1989	1,597,373	+16.7%
2002	1,436,570	−10.1%
2010	1,343,869	−6.5%
2021	1,292,944	−3.8%
2025	1,273,093	−1.5%
Source: Census data, estimate

Population: 1,292,944 (2021 census); 1,343,869 (2010 census); 1,436,570 (2002 census); 1,824,506 (1989 Soviet census).

=== Ethnic groups ===
Ethnicities in Khabarovsk Krai in 2021
Ethnicity	Population	Percentage
Russians	1,047,221	92.9%
Nanai	10,813	1.0%
Ukrainians	7,170	0.6%
Tajiks	4,332	0.4%
Koreans	3,740	0.3%
Evenki	3,709	0.3%
Other Ethnicities	50,780	3.9%
Ethnicity not stated	165,179	–

Vital statistics for 2024:

- Births: 11,142 (8.7 per 1,000)
- Deaths: 17,880 (14.0 per 1,000)

Total fertility rate (2024):
1.44 children per woman

Life expectancy (2021):
Total — 67.85 years (male — 62.91, female — 72.94)

=== Settlements ===
Largest cities or towns in Khabarovsk Krai 2010 Russian Census
Rank		Administrative Division	Pop.
1	Khabarovsk	Khabarovsky District	577,441
2	Komsomolsk-on-Amur	Komsomolsky District	263,906
3	Amursk	Amursky District	42,970
4	Nikolayevsk-on-Amur	Nikolayevsky District	22,752
5	Sovetskaya Gavan	Sovetsko-Gavansky District	27,712
6	Bikin	Bikinsky District	17,154
7	Vanino	Vaninsky District	17,001
8	Vyazemsky	Vyazemsky District	14,555
9	Solnechny	Solnechny District	13,306
10	Chegdomyn	Verkhnebureinsky District	13,048

=== Religion ===
Religion in Krai Oblast as of 2012 (Sreda Arena Atlas)
Russian Orthodoxy	26.2%
Other Orthodox	1.3%
Protestantism	0.5%
Other Christians	3.7%
Islam	1.1%
Rodnovery and other native faiths	0.5%
Spiritual but not religious	27.9%
Atheism and irreligion	23.1%
Other and undeclared	15.7%

According to a 2012 survey, 26.2% of the population of Khabarovsk Krai adheres to the Russian Orthodox Church, 4% are unaffiliated generic Christians, 1% adhere to other Orthodox churches or are believers in Orthodox Christianity who do not belong to any church, while 1% are adherents of Islam. In addition, 28% of the population declared to be "spiritual but not religious", 23% are atheist, and 16.8% follow other religions or did not give an answer to the question.

=== Education ===
There are the following institutions of higher education in Khabarovsk Krai.

- Pacific National University
- Far Eastern State University of Humanities
- Far Eastern State Medical University
- Khabarovsk State Academy of Economics and Law
- Far Eastern State Transport University
- Far Eastern Academy of Government Services
- Far Eastern State Physical Education University
- Khabarovsk State Institute of Arts and Culture
- Komsomolsk-on-Amur State Technical University
- Komsomolsk-on-Amur State Pedagogical institute

== Sport ==
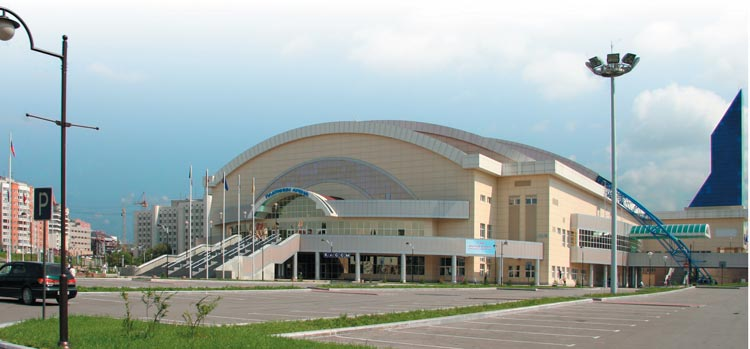
Platinum Arena

- Amur Khabarovsk, a professional hockey club of the international Kontinental Hockey League and plays its home games at the Platinum Arena.
- FC SKA-Energiya Khabarovsk is a professional association football team playing in the Russian Football National League, the second tier of Russian association football.
- SKA-Neftyanik is a professional bandy club which plays in the top-tier Russian Bandy Super League at its own indoor venue Arena Yerofey. In the 2016–17 season, the club became Russian champion for the first time.

The city was a host to the 1981 Bandy World Championship as well as to the 2015 Bandy World Championship. For the 2015 games, twenty-one teams originally were expected, which would have been four more than the record-making seventeen from the 2014 tournament, but eventually, only sixteen teams came. The A Division of the 2018 Bandy World Championship was again to be played in Khabarovsk.

== Sister relations ==
- South Gyeongsang Province, South Korea
- Hyōgo Prefecture, Japan

== See also ==
- List of Chairmen of the Legislative Duma of Khabarovsk Krai
- Tourism in Khabarovsk Krai
- History of Primorye
