= List of rural localities in Khabarovsk Krai =

Map of Russia with Khabarovsk Krai highlighted

This is a list of rural localities in Khabarovsk Krai. Khabarovsk Krai (Russian: Хаба́ровский край, romanized: Khabarovsky kray, IPA: [xɐˈbarəfskʲɪj kraj]) is a federal subject (a krai) of Russia. It is geographically located in the Far East region of the country and is a part of the Far Eastern Federal District. The administrative center of the krai is the city of Khabarovsk, which is home to roughly half of the krai's population and the second largest city in the Russian Far East (after Vladivostok). Khabarovsk Krai is the fourth-largest federal subject by area, with a population of 1,343,869 as of the (2010 Census).

== Amursky District ==
Rural localities in Amursky District:

- 147 km

== Ayano-Maysky District ==
Rural localities in Ayano-Maysky District:

- Aldoma
- Ayan

== Imeni Lazo District ==
Rural localities in Imeni Lazo District:

- 34 kilometr
- 43 kilometr
- 52 kilometr

== Imeni Poliny Osipenko District ==
Rural localities in Imeni Poliny Osipenko District:

- Imeni Poliny Osipenko

== Khabarovsky District ==
Rural localities in Khabarovsky District:

- 18 km
- 24 km
- Sikachi-Alyan
- Vyatskoye

== Komsomolsky District, Khabarovsk Krai ==
Rural localities in Komsomolsky District, Khabarovsk Krai:

- Chyorny Mys
- Selikhino

== Nanaysky District ==
Rural localities in Nanaysky District:

- Troitskoye

== Tuguro-Chumikansky District ==
Rural localities in Tuguro-Chumikansky District:

- Chumikan

== Ulchsky District ==
Rural localities in Ulchsky District:

- Bogorodskoye
- Tyr

== Verkhnebureinsky District ==
Rural localities in Verkhnebureinsky District:

- Chekunda

== Vyazemsky District, Khabarovsk Krai ==
Rural localities in Vyazemsky District, Khabarovsk Krai:

- Avan

== See also ==
- Lists of rural localities in Russia
