= Khabarovsk constituency =

Russian legislative constituency

Khabarovsk single-member constituency
- Constituency of the Russian State Duma

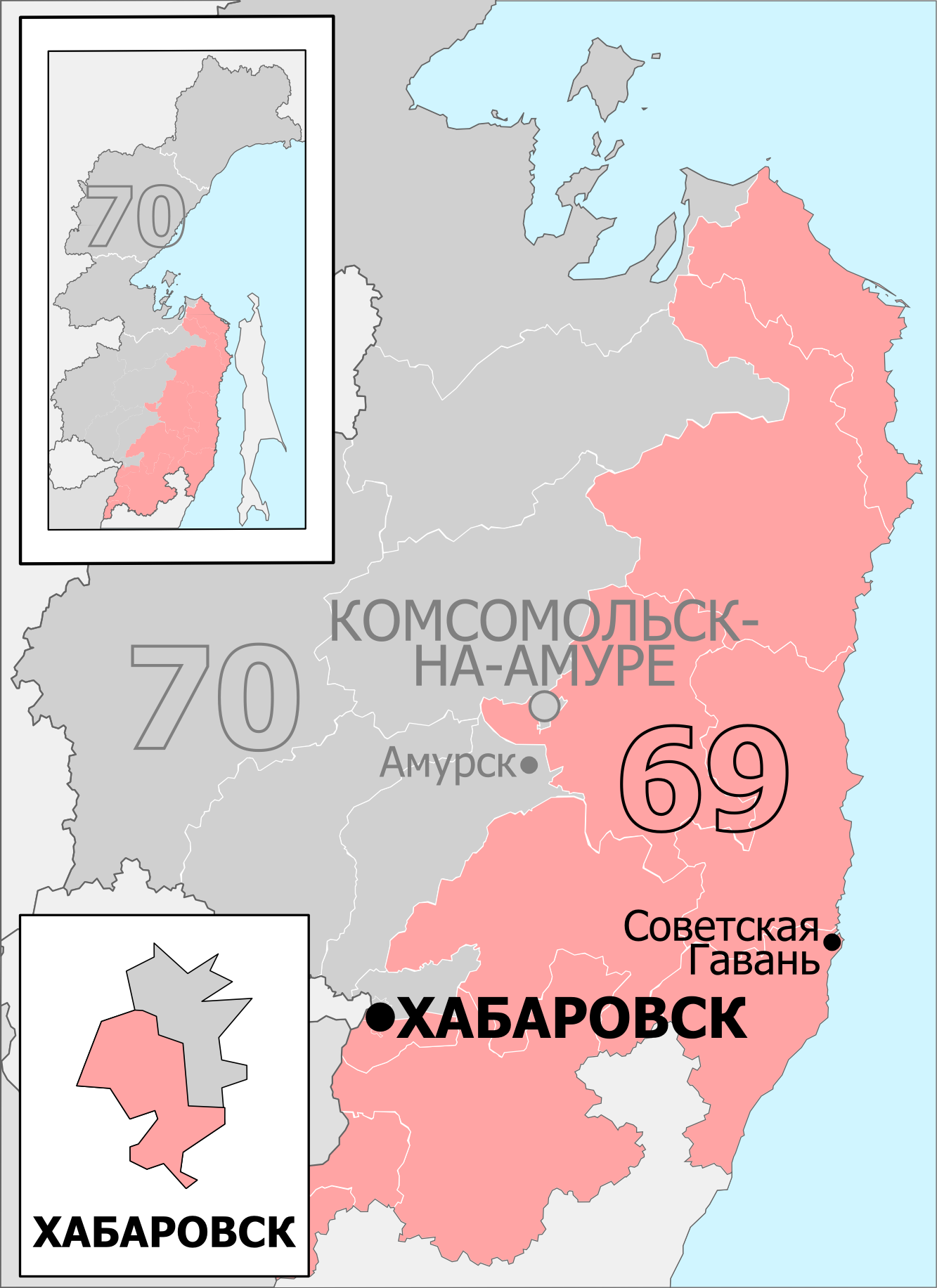
- Constituency boundaries since 2016
- Deputy: Sergey Kravchuk; United Russia
- Federal subject: Khabarovsk Krai
- Districts: Bikinsky, Imeni Lazo, Khabarovsk (Industrialny, Kirovsky and Tsentralny districts), Khabarovsky (Bychikha, Druzhbinskoe, Ilyinka, Kazakevichevo, Khabarovsk-47, Knyaze-Volkonskoe, Korfovskoe, Korsakovskoe, Nekrasovka, Osinovorechenskoe), Komsomolsky, Nanaysky, Nikolayevsky, Sovetsko-Gavansky, Ulchsky, Vaninsky, Vyazemsky
- Voters: 464,120 (2026)

The Khabarovsk constituency (No.73 (Note: No.57 in 1995-2003, No.58 in 1993-1995, No.59 in 2003-2007, No.69 in 2016–2026)) is a Russian legislative constituency in Khabarovsk Krai. The constituency covers southern half of Khabarovsk and mostly rural southern and eastern Khabarovsk Krai up to Komsomolsk-on-Amur suburbs.

The constituency has been represented since 2026 by United Russia deputy Sergey Kravchuk, former Khabarovsk mayor and municipal official, who won the open seat after defeating two-term United Russia incumbent Boris Gladkikh in the primary.

== Boundaries ==
1993–2007: Bikin, Bikinsky District, Imeni Lazo District, Khabarovsk, Khabarovsky District, Vyazemsky District
The constituency compactly covered the entirety of Khabarovsk, its suburbs and rural areas to the south to Bikin.

2016–present: Bikinsky District, Imeni Lazo District, Khabarovsk (Industrialny, Kirovsky and Tsentralny districts), Khabarovsky District (Bychikha, Druzhbinskoe, Ilyinka, Kazakevichevo, Khabarovsk-47, Knyaze-Volkonskoye, Korfovskoye, Korsakovskoye, Nekrasovka, Osinovorechenskoye), Komsomolsky District, Nanaysky District, Nikolayevsky District, Sovetsko-Gavansky District, Ulchsky District, Vaninsky District, Vyazemsky District
The constituency was re-created for the 2016 election and it retained only southern Khabarovsk and southern and eastern parts, losing the rest of its former territory to Komsomolsk-na-Amure constituency. This seat gained sparsely populated eastern Khabarovsk Krai on the shore of the Tatar Strait from the former Komsomolsk-na-Amure constituency.

== Members elected ==
Election	Member	Party
1993	Valery Podmasko	Independent
1995	Valentin Tsoi	Independent
1999	Boris Reznik	Independent
2003	Boris Reznik	Independent
2007	Proportional representation - no election by constituency	
2011	Proportional representation - no election by constituency	
2016	Boris Gladkikh	United Russia
2021	Boris Gladkikh	United Russia
2026	Sergey Kravchuk	United Russia

== Election results ==
=== 1993 ===
Summary of the 12 December 1993 Russian legislative election in the Khabarovsk constituency
Candidate	Party	Votes	%
Valery Podmasko	Independent	52,966	19.91%
Nikolay Bykov	Independent	49,426	18.58%
Yury Kachanovsky	Dignity and Charity	45,544	17.12%
Mikhail Kolbasko	Independent	38,233	14.37%
Yury Strugov	Russian Democratic Reform Movement	18,992	7.14%
against all		40,554	15.24%
Total		266,072	100%

=== 1995 ===
Summary of the 17 December 1995 Russian legislative election in the Khabarovsk constituency
Candidate	Party	Votes	%
Valentin Tsoi	Independent	63,411	16.83%
Valery Podmasko (incumbent)	Independent	47,857	12.70%
Nikolay Danilyuk	Communist Party	38,541	10.23%
Irina Yuryevskaya	Power to the People!	24,391	6.47%
Nikolay Arzamazov	Independent	23,607	6.26%
Feliks Kuperman	Pamfilova–Gurov–Lysenko	23,521	6.24%
Vladimir Grishkov	Liberal Democratic Party	16,540	4.39%
Novruz Mamedov	Independent	15,289	4.06%
Valery Kutushev	Independent	13,927	3.70%
Yury Berezutsky	Our Home – Russia	13,537	3.59%
Vadim Mantulov	Independent	13,413	3.56%
Vladimir Lipatov	Independent	8,099	2.15%
Viktor Koryakin	Trade Unions and Industrialists – Union of Labour	6,939	1.84%
Aleksey Zachesa	Party of Workers' Self-Government	3,855	1.02%
Galina Chupina	Independent	3,429	0.91%
Vyacheslav Mikhaltsov	Agrarian Party	3,420	0.91%
Rudolf Leontyev	Independent	3,054	0.81%
Aleksandr Petrov	Independent	2,465	0.65%
against all		45,884	12.18%
Total		376,870	100%

=== 1999 ===
Summary of the 19 December 1999 Russian legislative election in the Khabarovsk constituency
Candidate	Party	Votes	%
Boris Reznik	Independent	100,782	29.81%
Leonid Golub	Communist Party	49,511	14.64%
Mikhail Vovk	Independent	40,899	12.10%
Valentin Tsoi (incumbent)	Independent	30,982	9.16%
Yevgeny Isakov	Independent	29,947	8.86%
Vladimir Belyayev	Yabloko	13,946	4.12%
Irina Azarnina	Independent	13,609	4.03%
Aleksandr Zhirikov	Independent	9,642	2.85%
Vladimir Petrov	Andrei Nikolayev and Svyatoslav Fyodorov Bloc	4,140	1.22%
Andrey Mikheyev	Independent	2,153	0.64%
Yury Kovalev	Independent	1,753	0.52%
against all		34,815	10.30%
Total		338,103	100%

=== 2003 ===
Summary of the 7 December 2003 Russian legislative election in the Khabarovsk constituency
Candidate	Party	Votes	%
Boris Reznik (incumbent)	Independent	142,969	52.73%
Mikhail Vovk	Yabloko	25,725	9.49%
Vladimir Titorenko	Communist Party	16,756	6.18%
Leonid Razuvanov	Liberal Democratic Party	12,847	4.74%
Konstantin Zhukov	Party of Russia's Rebirth-Russian Party of Life	9,574	3.53%
Andrey Barzhanov	Union of Right Forces	8,580	3.16%
Vyacheslav Mikhaltsov	Agrarian Party	4,395	1.62%
Viktor Saykov	The Greens	4,212	1.55%
Oleg Firtsikov	Independent	2,634	0.97%
against all		39,295	14.49%
Total		271,845	100%

=== 2016 ===
Summary of the 18 September 2016 Russian legislative election in the Khabarovsk constituency
Candidate	Party	Votes	%
Boris Gladkikh	United Russia	71,086	36.94%
Yelena Greshnyakova	Liberal Democratic Party	40,074	20.82%
Viktor Postnikov	Communist Party	30,680	15.94%
Igor Glukhov	A Just Russia	13,939	7.24%
Yelena Astashova	Yabloko	10,367	5.39%
Vladimir Titorenko	Communists of Russia	6,722	3.49%
Aleksey Vorsin	People's Freedom Party	5,525	2.87%
Andrey Petrov	The Greens	5,374	2.79%
Total		192,460	100%

=== 2021 ===
Summary of the 17-19 September 2021 Russian legislative election in the Khabarovsk constituency
Candidate	Party	Votes	%
Boris Gladkikh (incumbent)	United Russia	54,987	25.85%
Pyotr Perevezentsev	Communist Party	44,253	20.80%
Aleksandr Fedchishin	Liberal Democratic Party	19,388	9.11%
Vladimir Parfenov	Party of Pensioners	19,044	8.95%
Igor Glukhov	A Just Russia — For Truth	14,950	7.03%
Valery Korzunov	New People	14,881	7.00%
Sergey Matveyev	Russian Party of Freedom and Justice	11,695	5.50%
Vladimir Titorenko	Communists of Russia	9,959	4.68%
Babek Mamedov	Rodina	6,633	3.12%
Ryurik Fominykh	Yabloko	4,153	1.95%
Total		212,733	100%

=== 2026 ===
Summary of the 18-20 September 2026 Russian legislative election in the Khabarovsk constituency
Candidate	Party	Votes	%
Sergey Kravchuk	United Russia	88,918	46.13%
Oleg Movchan	Communist Party	25,959	13.47%
Sergey Bezdenezhnykh	A Just Russia	18,957	9.84%
Kirill Tsmakalov	Liberal Democratic Party	14,940	7.75%
Ivan Rekhlov	New People	12,564	6.52%
Tatyana Mindagulova	Party of Pensioners	9,163	4.75%
Yevgeny Chadayev	Communists of Russia	7,091	3.68%
Sergey Savolikov	The Greens	4,415	2.29%
Ilya Timchenko	Party of Direct Democracy	2,823	1.46%
Total		192,748	100%
