= Jurbarkas Manor =

Coordinates: 55°04′45″N 22°45′25″E

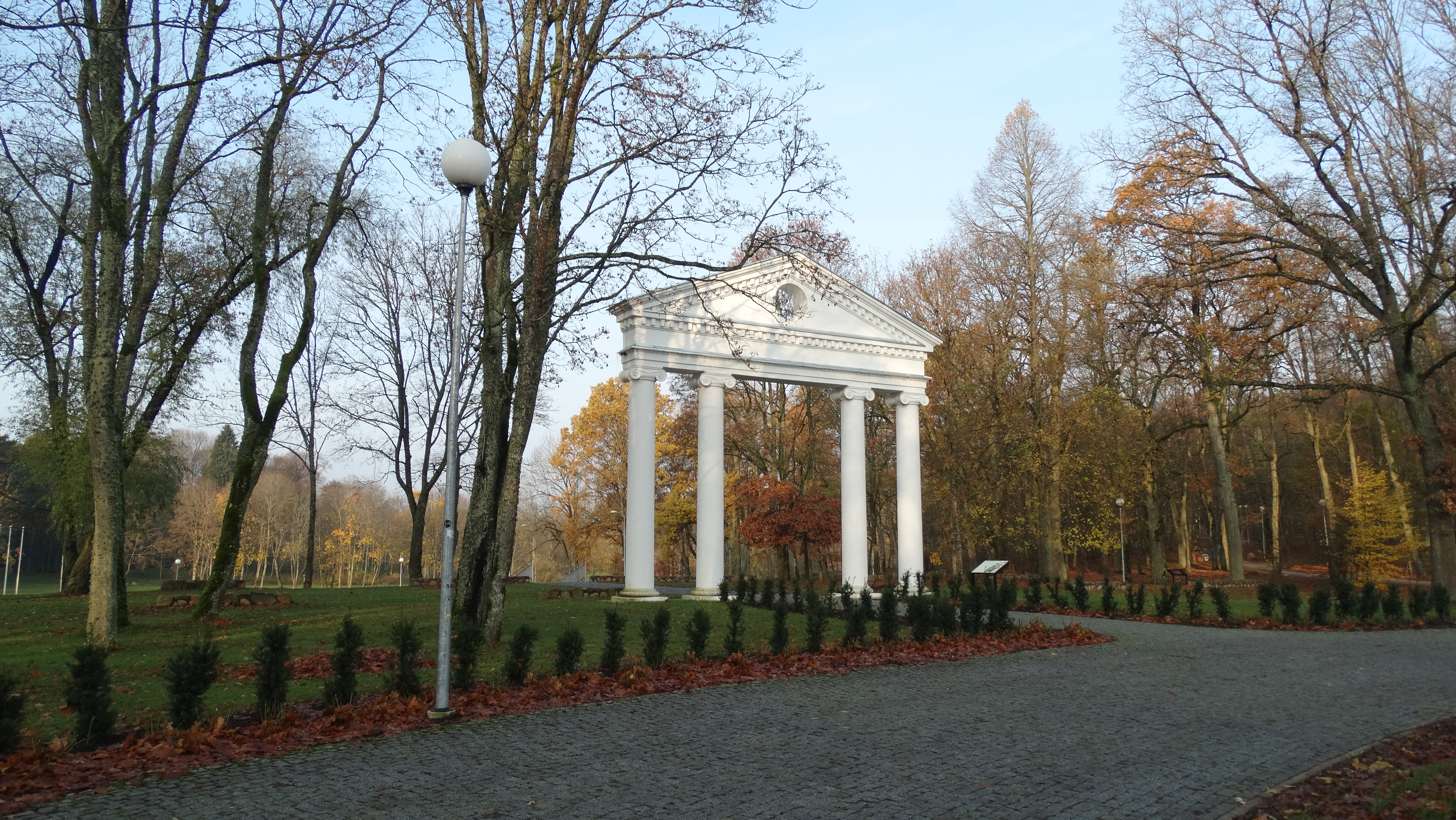

General information
- Location: Vydūno street 15, Jurbarkas, Lithuania
- Construction started: c. 1795
- Destroyed: c. 1915

Jurbarkas Manor was a former residential manor in Jurbarkas, Lithuania. The main manor house, destroyed in World War I, no longer exists.

The Jurbarkas Tourism and Business Information Center is located in the southern building, and the Jurbarkas Regional Museum in the northern one. Jurbarkas Exhibition and Concert Hall is located in the church. In 2015 the columns of the central palace of the manor were restored.

== History ==
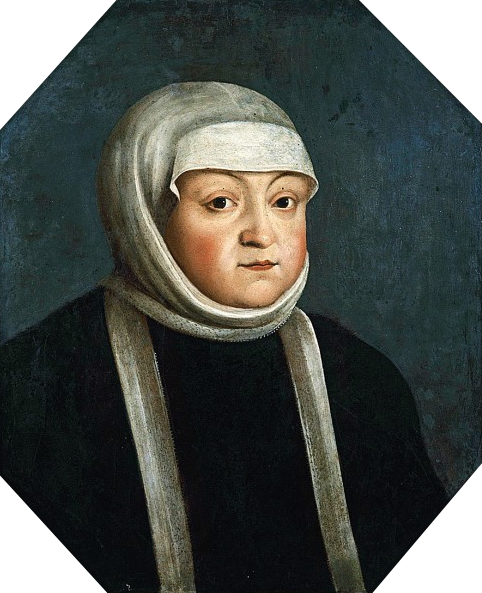
Bona Sforza

=== Ruled by Queens ===
From the 14th century the area of Jurbarkas was a royal holding given by the Lithuanian rulers to their wives: queens Bona Sforza, Cecilia Renata and Marie Louise Gonzaga. The most famous of them was Bona Sforza (1494–1557), the wife of Grand Duke of Lithuania, Sigismund I the Old (1467–1548).

=== Radziwiłł, Czartoryski and Potocki ===
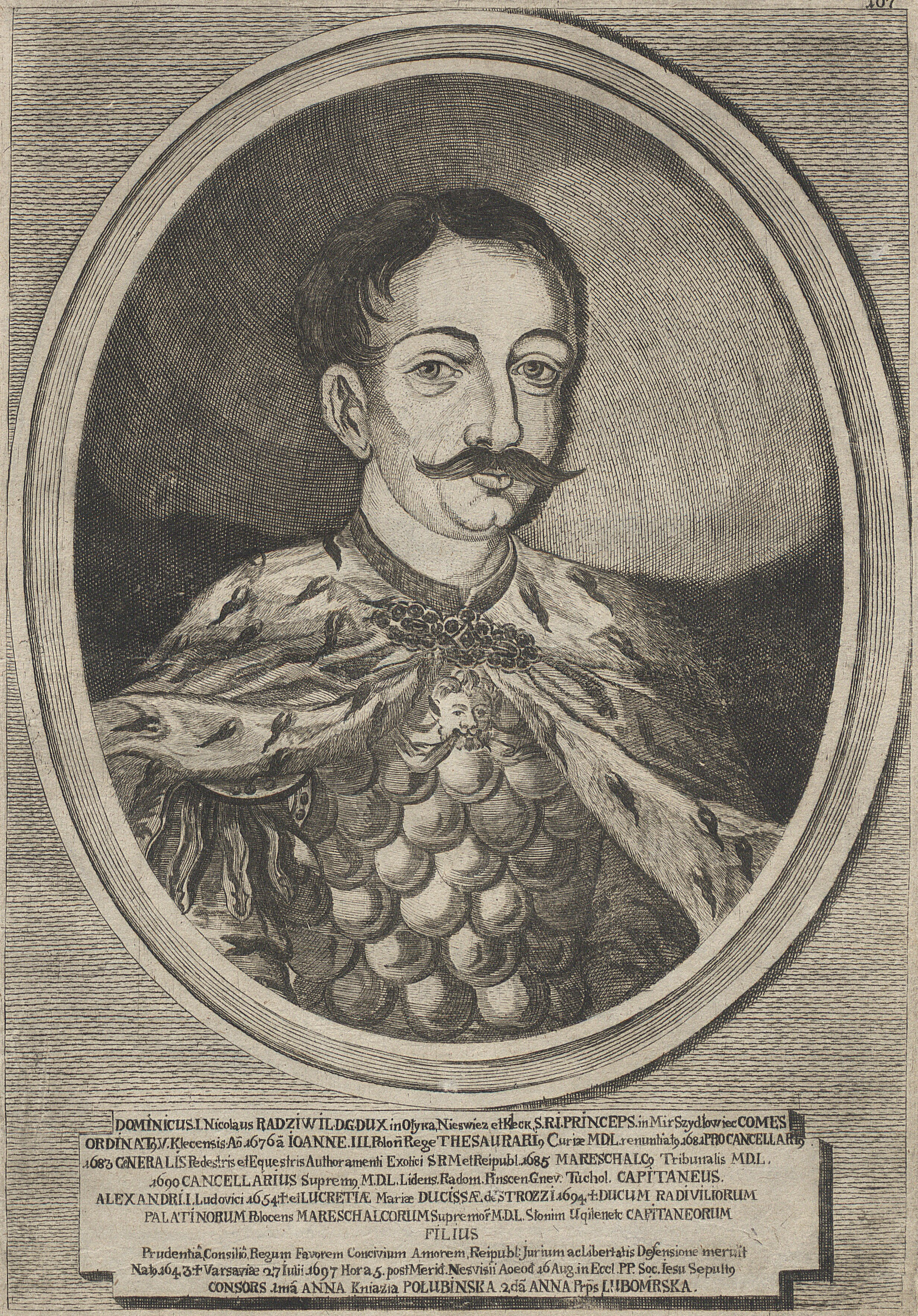
Dominik Mikołaj Radziwiłł

Later the manor belonged to members of Radziwiłł family: Ludwik Radziwiłł and Jan Mikołaj Radziwiłł.

In 1685, the son of Prince Aleksander Ludwik Radziwiłł (1594–1654), Vice Chancellor of the Grand Duchy of Lithuania Prince Dominik Mikołaj Radziwiłł (1643–1697) and his wife Anna Marianna Połubienska (1650–1690), became the rulers of Jurbarkas.

Jurbarkas town was destitute from the late 17th century to the early 18th century. Plague and famine killed many people; and many people died during the battle between the Sapieha and the Ogiński families. The Lithuanian Civil War (1700) and the Great Northern War (1700–1721) took further toll on the area.

On April 6, 1710, Mikołaj's son, Jan Radziwiłł (1681–1729) was the ruler of Jurbarkas. He and his wife Dorota (1682–1755) were bestowed with perpetual rights to govern the lands of Jurbarkas and Virbalis, which was followed by various disagreements over power.

Soon the town was taken over by Michał and Eleonora Czartoryski, who were also granted the perpetual right of governance. However, they were also forced to resign the governance.

From 1774, Jurbarkas was given to Count Ignacy Potocki (1750–1809) and Elżbieta Potocka née Lubomirska (1755–1783).

Wars of the first half of the 18th century, ceaseless movements and deployments of armies continued to destroy the town.

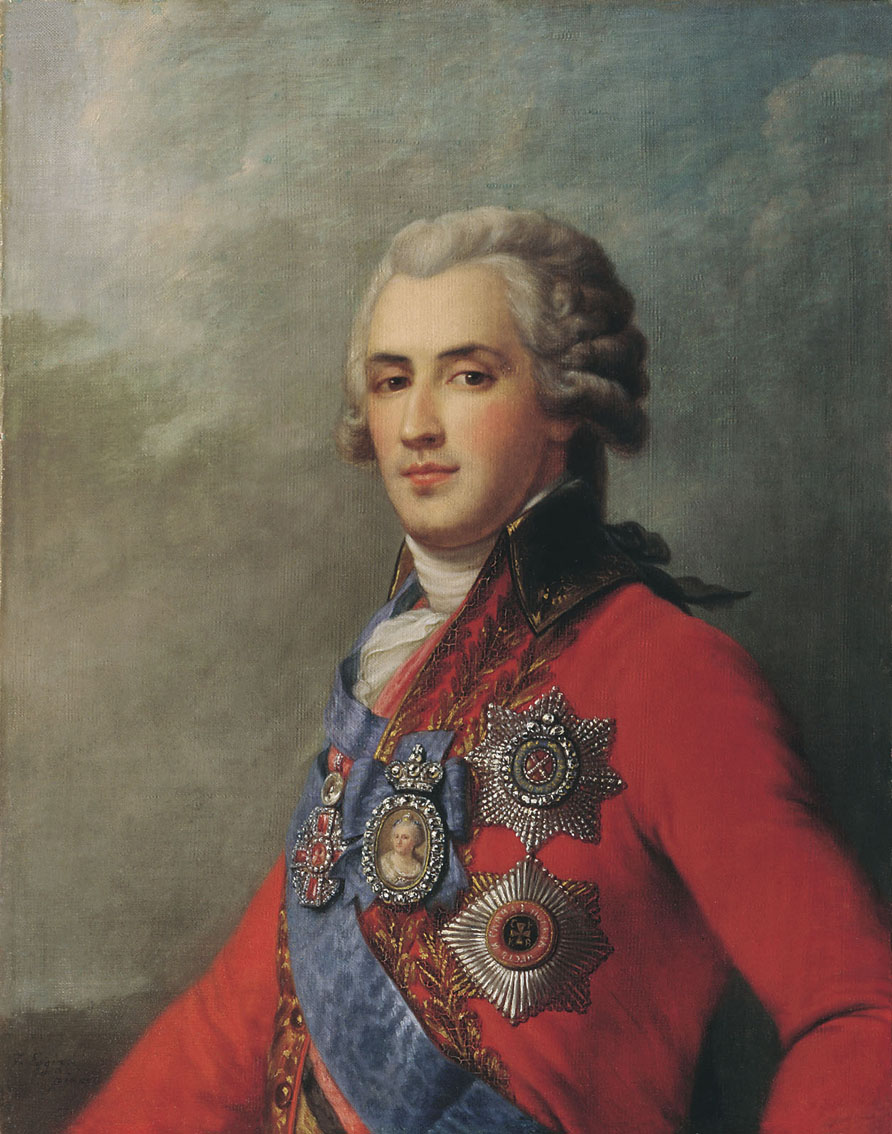
Platon Zubov

=== Following the Third Polish Partition ===
==== Count Platon Zubov (1767–1822) ====
After the fall of the Polish-Lithuanian Commonwealth, Russian Empress Catherine the Great gave Jurbarkas to Count Platon Zubov. Zubov was the last of Catherine's favourites and the most powerful man in the Russian Empire during the last years of her reign. It was probably during Zubov's time that the stone two-storey Neoclassical mansion with single-storey side risalites was built.

In 1796, after the death of Catherine the Great and the ascension of Tsar Paul I, Platon Zubov was relieved of all his posts, stripped of his estates and exiled to Germany.

=== The Vassiltchikov Family ===
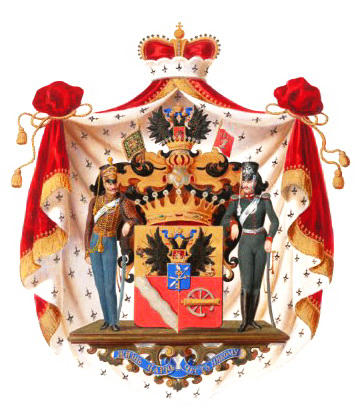
Coat of Arms of the Vassiltchikov family

==== General Hilarion Vassiltchikov (1776–1847) ====
In 1845 Tsar Nicholas I took Jurbarkas from the Zubov family and gave it to General Hilarion Vassiltchikov.

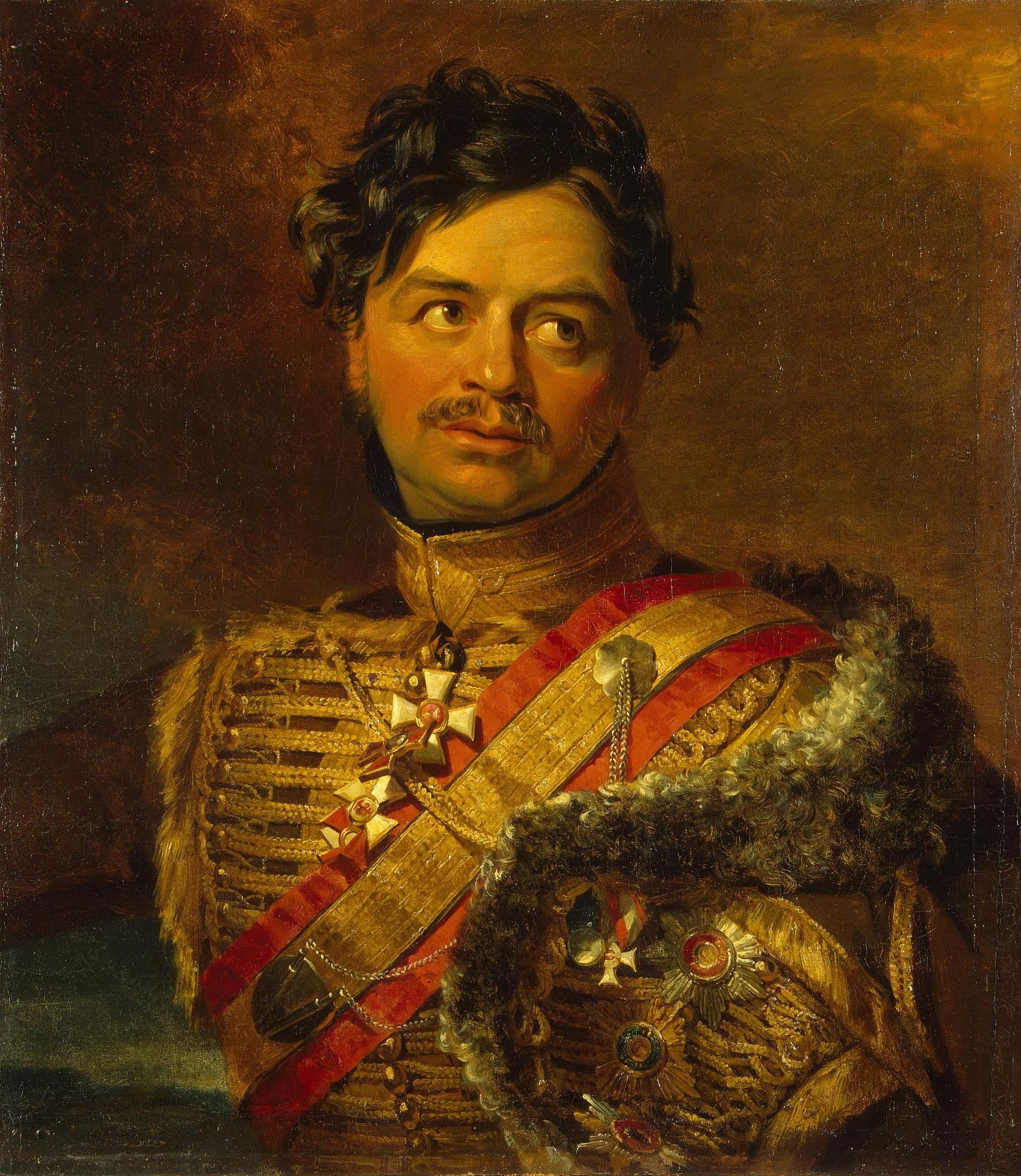
General Hilarion Vassiltchikov (1776–1847)

The Vassiltchikov family (Rus: Васильчиков) were a rich, famous and influential family in Tsarist Russia. They owned vast areas of land across Russia and Ukraine. Many Vasilchikovs were famous military officers and public figures.

General Hilarion Vassiltchikov normally visited Jurbarkas from St. Petersburg only for the summer. Vassiltchikov encircled the estate with a high red brick wall (fragments and gate posts still survive), and two stone servants' quarters were built (or rebuilt). Servants lived in the south building: the more elegantly outfitted north building was designated for the owners and guests. A former liquor storehouse beside this building was renovated into a small Orthodox Church in 1865. To the west, agricultural and administrative buildings were built, further from the Mituva River.

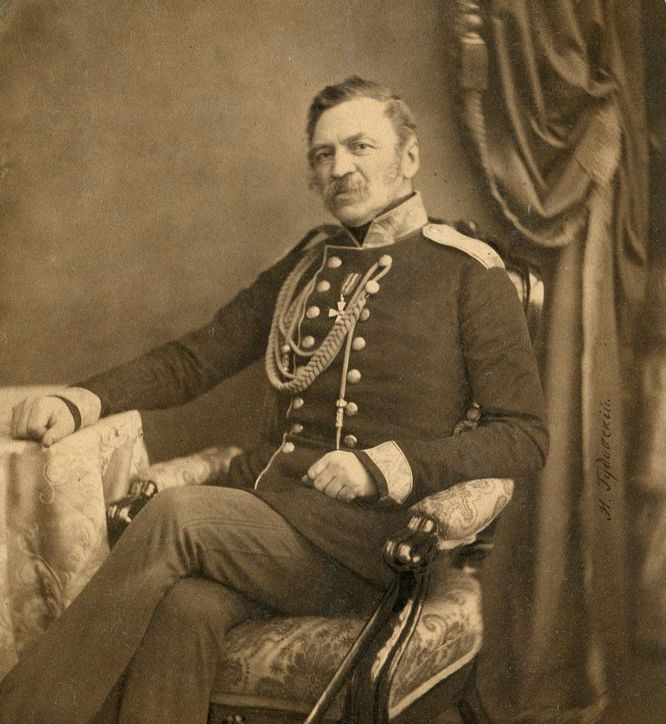
General Illarion Illarionovich Vassiltchikov (1805–1862)

==== General Ilarion Illarionovich Vassiltchikov (1805–1862) ====
After Hilarion's death, Jurbarkas was split into two parts and inherited by his two sons.

Jurbarkas was later transferred solely to one of the sons, General Ilarion Illarionovich Vassiltchikov. Although Ilarion Vassiltchikov and his wife Yekaterina (1818–1869) used to come to Jurbarkas from St. Petersburg only in summer, they took good care of the estate.

==== Colonel Sergei Vassiltchikov (1849–1926) ====
After the death of Duke Ilarion Vassiltchikov in 1862, Jurbarkas was taken over by his son Sergei Vassiltchikov, guard colonel and a person well-known in the Russian Tsar's court.

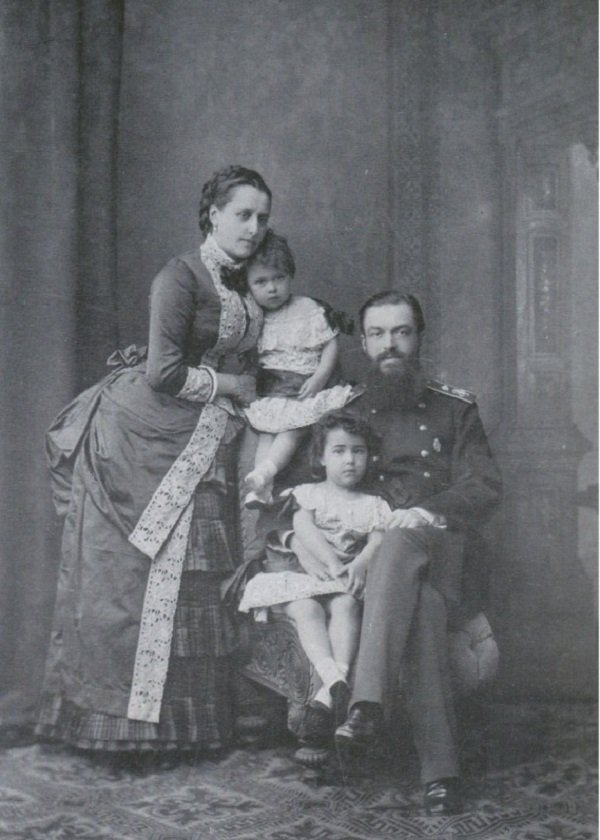
Lidiya, Illarion Vassiltchikov (1881–1969) and their first two children: Alexander and Irina

Of all the Vasilchikovs, Sergei was the most important person in terms of modernization of the manor, management of the town of Jurbakas and the development of education and culture in the area. In 1865, a school was opened on the initiative of the Vasilchikovs. They also founded and financed a home for old women and the poor. Although industry in the town was limited, all production was set up almost entirely by the Vasilchikovs. A brickyard and a brewery of the manor operated for several decades. Home industry was promoted in several ways. A school of Lithuanian textiles was established by Duchess Maria Vassiltchikov in the late 19th century. A large watermill with sawmill and wool-spinning capabilities was built in 1903. Cheese and butter manufacturing developed. In 1903, the Vassiltchikov family built the first power plant in Jurbarkas. The landlords also traded in timber.

The Vassiltchikov dukes did not resist the Lithuanian National Revival Movement which began in the early 20th century. On November 2, 1905, they allowed the first Lithuanian culture event in Jurbarkas—the staging of the comedy "Americka pirtyje" ("America in a Bathhouse") written by brothers Antanas and Juozas Vilkutaičiai, known by the nickname 'Keturakis', and staged by lawyer Skirgailienė—to be organized in the barn of the manor.

The Vassiltchikov dukes also used to donate money or materials for the reconstruction of local buildings destroyed by fire.

==== General Illarion Sergeyevich Vassiltchikov (1881–1969) ====
The running of Jurbarkas was gradually taken over by Sergei's son, Illarion Sergeyevich Vassiltchikov. Illarion was married to Lidiya Leonidovna Vyazemskaya (1886–1948). In 1910, they had Princess Irina (1910–1992) and then two years later Prince Alexander (1912–1939).

Illarion Sergeyevich Vassiltchikov was a politician, the provincial Marshall of the Nobility and later, a member of the last Russian Duma and the Chairman of the Russian minority in Independent Lithuania.

=== World War I ===
On August 1, 1914, Germany declared war on Russia. The border of the Empire was only 10 km from Jurbarkas and so the Vassiltchikov family moved to Petrograd (modern-day St. Petersburg). General Ilarion Sergeyevich Vassiltchikov was appointed the commander of a cavalry division.

When the German army reached Jurbarkas, learning that the manor house belonged to an enemy commander, they immediately burned it down.

In Petrograd, Illarion and Lidiya had two more children: Tatiana von Metternich-Winneburg (1915–2006) and Marie Vassiltchikov (1917–1978).

Following the Bolshevik October Revolution, the Vassiltchikov family fled Russia in 1919 to Crimea and then to Constantinople. They were part of the British evacuation of the Imperial Family from Russia.

They lived as refugees initially in the French Third Republic.

While in France, Illarion and Lidiya had one more child, George Vassiltchikov (1919–2008).

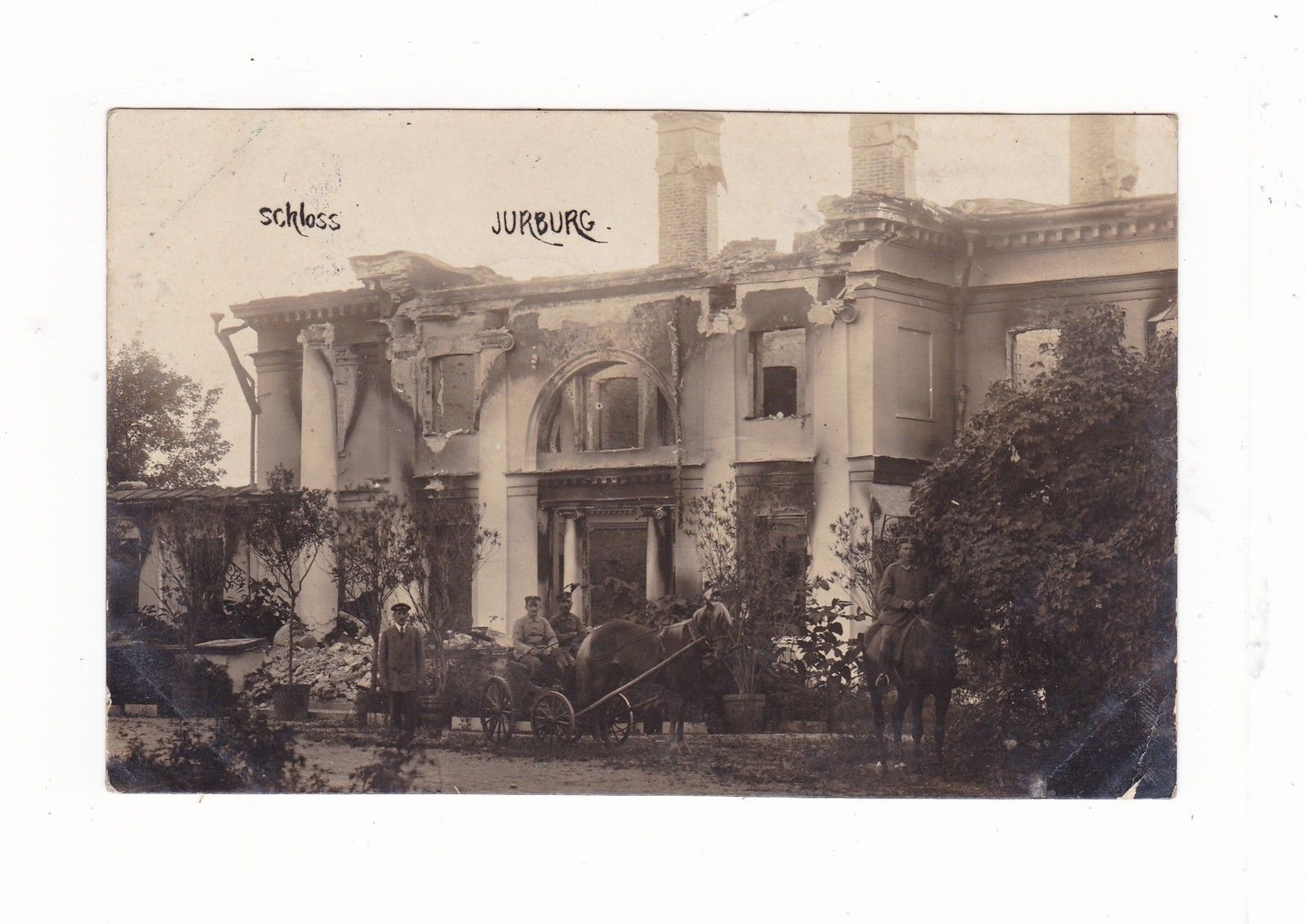
Jurbarko Manor House 1915

=== The Interwar Period ===
In the interwar period, Jurbarkas estate land was distributed to local farmers. The manor and park was given to Jurbarkas gymnasium. The park became open to the public. One of the administrative buildings on the estate was home to the sculptor Vincas Grybas.

Because the Vassiltchikov family lost their income from Jurbarkas they became, according to son George "impoverished émigrés" in France.

The family then lived in the German Weimar Republic between 1932 and 1934. In 1934, Illarion, Lidiya and George returned to Lithuania and settled in Kaunas. Here, Illarion engaged in social activities and farming.

=== World War II ===
Soon after the Red Army arrived in Lithuania, Lidiya Leonidovna and her son George left for Berlin.

Later they moved to Rome, then to Paris.

Illarion stayed in Lithuania for another six months before fleeing to Germany in June 1940, when Lithuania was annexed to the USSR. He settled permanently in Baden-Baden. Illarion devoted the last years of his life to writing his memoirs and essays on various Russian historical topics.

Illarion Vassiltchikov died on June 3, 1969, in Ebersteinburg, Germany. He was buried in Baden-Baden. The archive of Prince Illarion Vassiltchikov is stored in the Bahmetevsky archive of Russian emigration at Columbia University.

==== Marie Vassiltchikov and the July Plot to kill Adolf Hitler ====
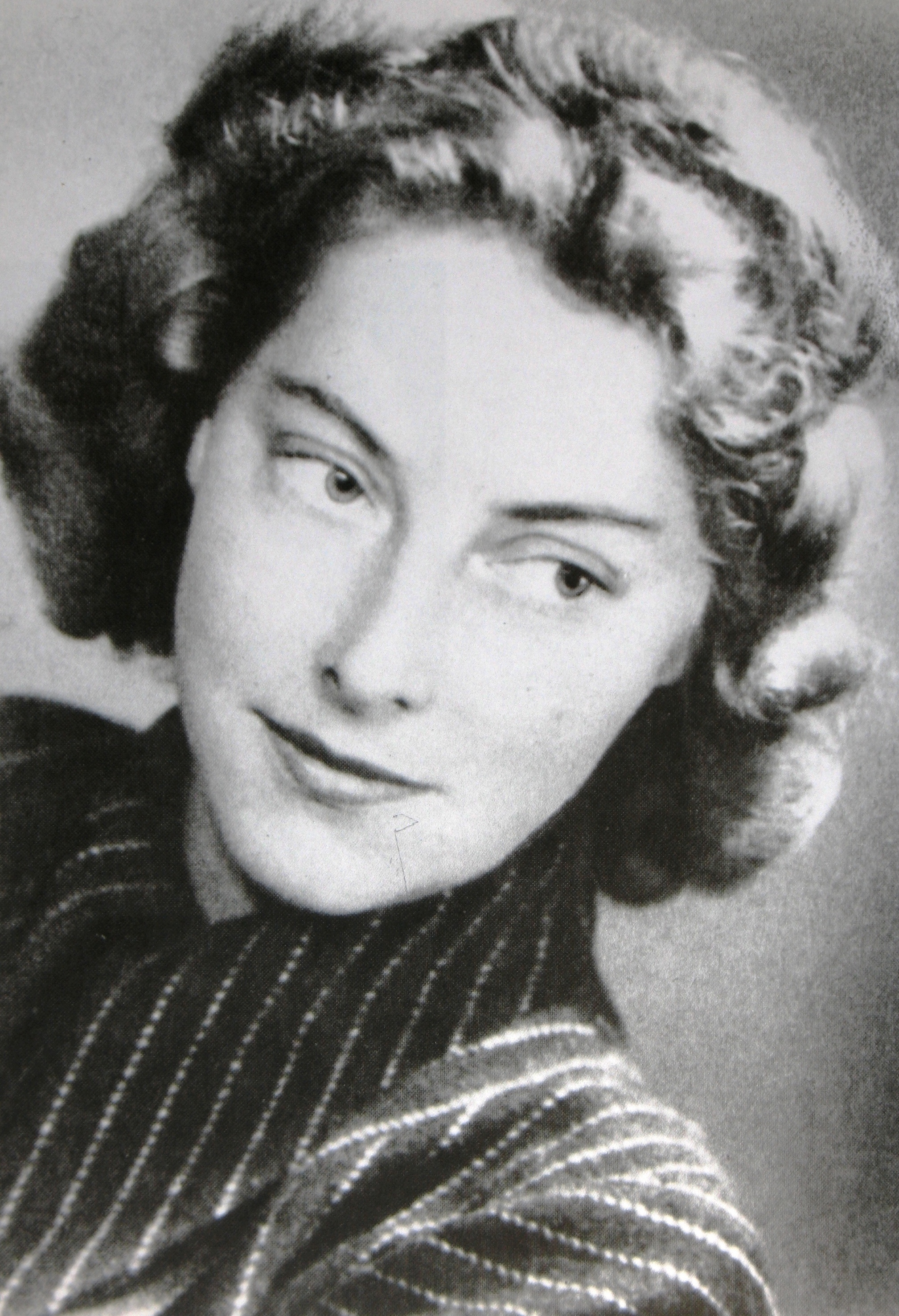
Marie Vassiltchikov

At the beginning of World War II, Marie Vassiltchikov ended up in Germany, where she got a job in the Information Department of the Ministry of Foreign Affairs.

On May 4, 1945, Marie married Peter Harnden on January 28, 1946. Following Peter's demobilization, he and Marie moved to Paris. Peter died in Barcelona in 1971. Marie moved to London where she died on August 12, 1978.

She was survived by her four children: Marina Harnden (born September 15, 1948), Anthony Harnden (born in Paris February 13, 1951, died in Cadaqués January 4, 1999); Michael Harnden, (born October 10, 1954); Alexandra Harnden, (born March 18, 1956).

==== Tatiana Vassiltchikov ====
Marie's sister, Tatiana Vassiltchikov was married to German aristocrat Paul Alfons von Metternich-Winneburg, a famous figure in international motor sports.

Once the greater part of Schloss Johannesburg had been rebuilt after the war, Tatiana and Paul made it their permanent home. Since the beginning of the 1990s, then a German citizen, Tatyana Metternich regularly visited St. Petersburg, where she conducted extensive charity work. In February 2003, Tatyana opened a new shelter for street children on Rustaveli Street; in the same month, President Vladimir Putin thanked her on behalf of Russia. Tatyana Ilarionovna Vassiltchikov is the author of fifteen books. Her biographical book, A Woman with Five Passports. The Tale of an Amazing Fate (St. Petersburg, 1999) has become a European bestseller. She died on July 26, 2006.

==== George Vassiltchikov ====
George Vassiltchikov went to university in Rome, Berlin and Paris. In the autumn of 1942, he moved to France and, soon after, became involved in Resistance activities, which continued until the liberation of Paris in August 1944.

His first job was in journalism in France. He was then "lured" by the Americans to go to Nuremberg to be an interpreter in the war trials. He then moved on to the UN where he worked for many years as an interpreter. He stayed with the UN world until 1976 when he went to London to work in business.

He was married and had two children. He died in 2008 in Rolle, Switzerland.

==== Irena and Lidiya Vassiltchikov ====
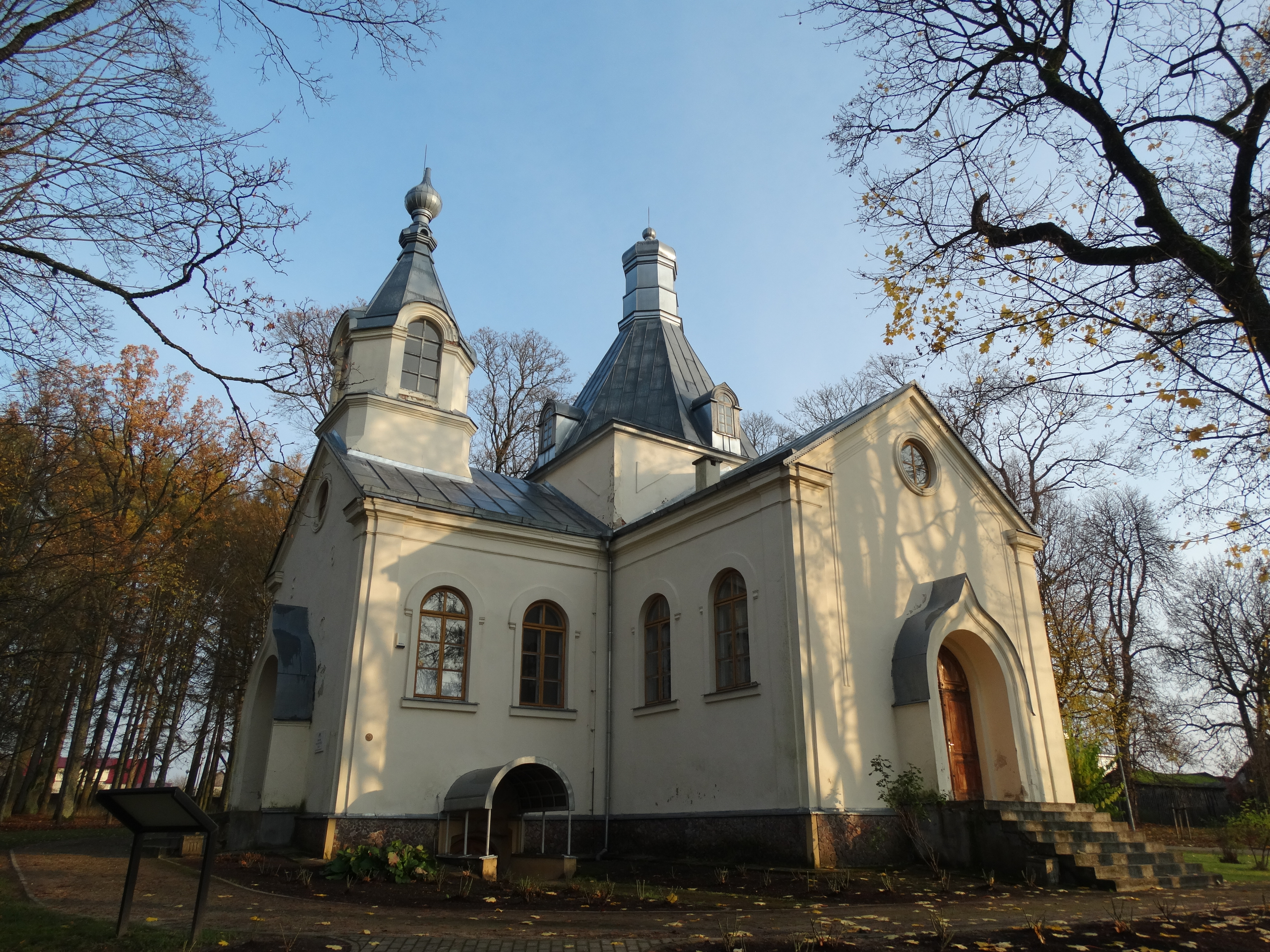
Former Jurbarkas manor Orthodox Church, now exhibition hall

Irena Vassiltchikov spent the post-war years in Italy. She was in numerous Italian films in the 1970s.

In 1980 she moved to Germany. She died on February 26, 1992.

Lidiya Leonidovna died on November 30, 1948, in Baden Baden, Bade Wurtemberg, Allemagne, aged 62 years old.

=== The Soviet Era ===
Back in Lithuania, in 1956, the crosses of the Jurbarkas Manor church were removed, the building was used as a dance hall and an exhibition hall for some time and later it was turned into a vegetable warehouse.

== The Manor Architecture ==
The manor house itself, built in the Russian Empire style with columns and two wings, was approximately 50 m long and 15 m wide. It stood at the end of a long driveway. On both sides of the building there were entrance ways with steps. The most beautiful part of the building was the oval hall, where the Duke entertained honourable guests.

The Manor House was destroyed in World War I.

=== Buildings ===
Besides the manor house, there was also a brick stables, forge, icehouse, woodshed, a kitchen, a brick house near the Mituva, a house for the blacksmith, a brick church, two barns, a threshing barn, a mill, servant's quarters and a sauna.

== The Park ==
Jurbarkas Manor is surrounded by a mixed park, which runs along the Mituva River and covers an area of thirty hectares. In the gently undulating relief of the park there are alleys for walks, you can cross the river by a bridge, and in the center of the park is a circular ground floor. Maple, linden, birch, oak, bark, larch and other tree species grow in the territory of the manor.

== The Manor Today ==
- located in the old servants' quarters, the Jurbarkas Regional Museum holds theatrical excursions during. The brick two-storey building retains an ornate wood décor interior, the ceiling with wood carvings has been preserved;
- one of the museum exhibits is dedicated to the 13th–14th century battles with the Teutonic Knights that took place in the vicinity of Jurbarkas;
- the concert and exhibition hall in what was once the manor's Eastern Orthodox church holds exhibitions and chamber music concerts;
- at the Vincas Grybas Memorial Museum, which is located in some of the old manor buildings, you will see the sculptor's unique working environment and models of his work. The adjacent art house is used for workshops where you can learn how to hand build or wheel throw pottery, or make glass jewellery.
- in 2015, the columns of the central Jurbarkas Manor house were restored.

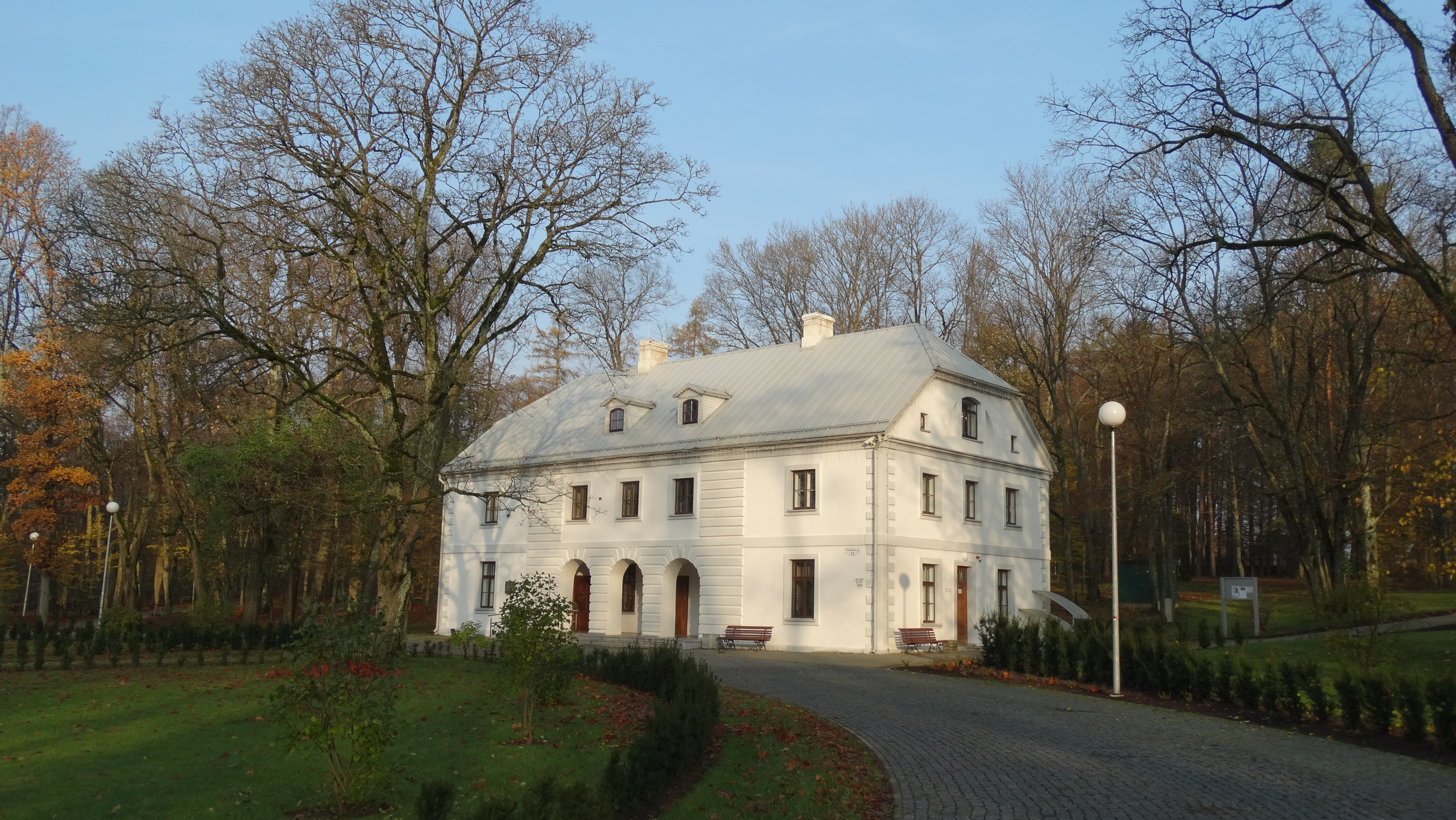
Jurbarkas Museum Building

=== Museum ===
The museum at Jurbarkas was established in one of the extant buildings of Jurbarkas Manor: the northern servant's quarters. The building represents the architecture of classicism style typical of the nineteenth century. The building was renovated and a new museum exposition was created.

Adjacent to it is the church, an example of Byzantine architecture reminding visitors that the Vasilchikovs were of Russian origin who professed Orthodoxy.
