= Vyazemsky =

Vyazemsky (masculine), Vyazemskaya (feminine), or Vyazemskoye (neuter) may refer to:

== People ==
- Lidiya Vyazemskaya (1886–1946), mother of Tatiana von Metternich-Winneburg, German patron of the arts, and of Marie Vassiltchikov, Russian princess
- Nikifor Vyazemsky, Russian prince and owner of Afrosinya, a royal mistress of Alexey Petrovich, Tsarevich of Russia
- Pyotr Vyazemsky (1792–1878), Russian poet

== Places ==
- Vyazemsky District, several districts in Russia
- Vyazemsky Urban Settlement, a municipal formation which the town of Vyazemsky in Vyazemsky District of Khabarovsk Krai is incorporated as
- Vyazemskoye Urban Settlement, an administrative division and a municipal formation which the town of Vyazma in Vyazemsky District of Smolensk Oblast is incorporated as
- Vyazemsky (inhabited locality) (Vyazemskaya, Vyazemskoye), several inhabited localities in Russia
- Vyazemskaya railway station, a railway station on the Trans-Sibirian Railway in the town of Vyazemsky, Khabarovsk Krai, Russia
- Vyazemsky Lane, a side street in St. Petersburg, Russia

== See also ==
- Anne Wiazemsky (1947–2017), French actress and novelist
