= Vyazma (disambiguation) =

Vyazma is a town in Vyazemsky District of Smolensk Oblast, Russia.

Vyazma may also refer to:

- Vyazma (river), a river in the Smolensk Oblast in Russia, a left tributary of the Dnieper
- Vyazma (inhabited locality), several inhabited localities in Russia
- Vyazma Airport, an airport in Smolensk Oblast, Russia

== See also ==
- Vyazemsky (disambiguation)
- Battle of Vyazma, a part of the 1812 French invasion of Russia
- Vyazma pocket, created by the encirclement of Red Army units by the German Army during the advance on Moscow in October 1941
