= Vyazemsky (inhabited locality) =

Vyazemsky (Russian: Вя́земский; masculine), Vyazemskaya (Вя́земская; feminine), or Vyazemskoye (Вя́земское; neuter) is the name of several inhabited localities in Russia.

Urban localities

- Vyazemsky, Khabarovsk Krai, a town in Vyazemsky District of Khabarovsk Krai

Rural localities

- Vyazemsky, Smolensk Oblast, a selo in Vyazemsky District of Smolensk Oblast
- Vyazemskoye (rural locality), a village in Mozhaysky District of Moscow Oblast
