= Avan, Khabarovsk Krai =

Avan Аван
- Village
- Location within Khabarovsk Krai Location within Russia
- Coordinates: 47°28′N 134°39′E
- Country: Russia
- Region: Khabarovsk Krai
- District: Vyazemsky District
- Time zone: UTC+10:00

Avan (Russian: Аван) is a rural locality (a village) in Vyazemsky District, Khabarovsk Krai, Russia. The population was 714 as of 2018. There are 13 streets.

== Geography ==
Avan is located 11 km southwest of Vyazemsky (the district's administrative centre) by road. Otradnoye is the nearest rural locality.
