= Vyazemsky District =

Location of Khabarovsk Krai in Russia

Location of Smolensk Oblast in Russia

Vyazemsky District is the name of several administrative and municipal districts in Russia.

- Vyazemsky District, Khabarovsk Krai, an administrative and municipal district of Khabarovsk Krai
- Vyazemsky District, Smolensk Oblast, an administrative and municipal district of Smolensk Oblast

== See also ==
- Vyazemsky (disambiguation)
