= 43 kilometr =

43 kilometr 43 километр
- Settlement
- Location within Khabarovsk Krai Location within Russia
- Coordinates: 48.09°N 135.646389°E
- Country: Russia
- Region: Khabarovsk Krai
- District: Imeni Lazo District
- Time zone: UTC+10:00

43 kilometr (Russian: 43 километр) is a rural locality (a settlement) in Oborskoye Rural Settlement of Imeni Lazo District, Russia. The population was 214 as of 2012. There are 2 streets.

== Geography ==
The settlement is located on the right tributary of the Obor River, 59 km northeast of Pereyaslavka (the district's administrative centre) by road. Obor is the nearest rural locality.

== Streets ==
- Zelyonaya
