= 52 kilometr =

52 kilometr 52 километр
- Settlement
- Location within Khabarovsk Krai Location within Russia
- Coordinates: 48.124167°N 135.726111°E
- Country: Russia
- Region: Khabarovsk Krai
- District: Imeni Lazo District
- Time zone: UTC+10:00

52 kilometr (Russian: 52 километр) is a rural locality (a passing loop) in Oborskoye Rural Settlement of Imeni Lazo District, Russia. The population was 31 as of 2012. There are 3 streets.

== Geography ==
The settlement is located on the right tributary of the Obor River, 65 km east of Pereyaslavka (the district's administrative centre) by road. Obor is the nearest rural locality.

== Streets ==
- Dachnaya
- Dorozhnaya
- Lesnaya
