= 34 kilometr =

34 kilometr 34 километр
- Settlement
- Location within Khabarovsk Krai Location within Russia
- Coordinates: 48.116111°N 135.539444°E
- Country: Russia
- Region: Khabarovsk Krai
- District: Imeni Lazo District
- Time zone: UTC+10:00

34 kilometr (Russian: 34 километр) is a rural locality (a settlement) in Sitinskoye Rural Settlement of Imeni Lazo District, Russia. The population was 67 as of 2012. There are 10 streets.

== Geography ==
The settlement is located in the upper reaches of the Sita river, 51 km northeast of Pereyaslavka (the district's administrative centre) by road. 43 km is the nearest rural locality.
