= Vyazma (inhabited locality) =

Vyazma (Russian: Вязьма) is the name of several inhabited localities in Russia.

== Modern localities ==
Urban localities

- Vyazma, a town in Vyazemsky District of Smolensk Oblast

Rural localities

- Vyazma, Kaluga Oblast, a village in Sukhinichsky District of Kaluga Oblast
- Vyazma, Lipetsk Oblast, a village in Lebyazhensky Selsoviet of Izmalkovsky District in Lipetsk Oblast; 52°51′N 37°57′E
- Vyazma, Tver Oblast, a village in Verkhnevolzhskoye Rural Settlement of Kalininsky District in Tver Oblast

== Alternative names ==
- Vyazma, alternative name of Vyazemskoye, a village in Klementyevskoye Rural Settlement of Mozhaysky District in Moscow Oblast; 55°34′N 35°59′E

== See also ==
- Vyazemsky (disambiguation)
