= Marie Vassiltchikov =

Russian princess

Marie Vassiltchikovm c. 1935

Cover of "Berlin Diaries"

Princess Marie Illarionovna Vassiltchikov (Russian: Мария Илларионовна Васильчикова; 11 January 1917 – 12 August 1978) was a Russian princess who wrote Berlin Diaries, 1940-1945, which described the effects of the bombing of Berlin and events leading to the attempted assassination of Adolf Hitler in the 20 July Plot.

== Early life ==
Princess Marie ("Missie") Vassiltchikov was born in Saint Petersburg, Russian Empire on 11 January 1917. She was the fourth child of a member of the Fourth Duma, Prince Hilarion Vassiltchikov (1881–1969) and his wife, the former Princess Lidiya Vyazemskaya (1886–1946). Her family fled Russia in 1919, following the Bolshevik October Revolution by joining members of the Romanov family evacuated by the British fleet.

Marie Vassiltchikov lived as a refugee, initially in the French Third Republic, then Weimar Republic Germany, and then Lithuania until just before the start of World War II.

== World War II ==
In 1940, Vassiltchikov and her sister, Princess Tatiana Vassiltchikova (Tatiana von Metternich-Winneburg) (1915–2006), traveled to Berlin where, as stateless persons, they were able to obtain work permits. After brief employment with the Broadcasting Service, Vassiltchikov transferred to the Auswärtiges Amt (AA), the German Foreign Ministry's Information Office, where she worked as the assistant to Dr. Adam von Trott zu Solz, a key member of the anti-Nazi resistance, a former Rhodes scholar, and a descendant of American founding father, John Jay.

Vassiltchikov, an avid diarist who lived in borrowed apartments, kept an account of her life that she hid at her workplace, and attended events at aristocratic locales. This included a royal wedding at Schloss Neuschwanstein, and repeated visits to Schloss Johannisberg (Rheingau) and Schloss Königswart (now Kynžvart Castle in the Czech Republic).

== 20 July plot ==
Vassiltchikov's workplace, the A.A., was a gathering place for civilian members of the anti-Nazi resisters, including Adam von Trott zu Solz, who was a member of the Kreisau Circle, the leaders of the 20 July Plot to kill Adolf Hitler. They had to hide their activities from Nazi SS General, Franz Six, von Trott zu Solz's A.A.'s Reich Security Office contact, a convicted Nuremberg trial war criminal responsible for crimes against humanity as one of the leaders of Einsatzgruppen B's Vorkommando Moskau active in Smolensk.

Vassiltchikov described Six in her diary as an evil presence who carried a whip with a German Shepherd at his side, and said that von Trott zu Solz made a point to meet with Six alone so that others would not have to deal with him. Not thought to be actively involved in the plot, Vassiltchikov alluded to repeated conversations with von Trott zu Solz about it in her diary, recorded her life in the plotters' circle in shorthand, and changed the diary's hiding locations.

Following the failed attempt to kill Hitler, Vassiltchikov and Princess Elenore (Loremarie) von Schönburg went to Gestapo headquarters to plead for the life of von Trott zu Solz and others, and to bring food and packages until they were warned by a guard not to return.

== Bombing of Berlin ==
Vassiltchikov's diaries detail the bombing of Berlin, the bombing of the Berlin Zoo, and the chaotic daily life of what remained of Berlin's cosmopolitan pre-war nobility and intelligentsia.

== Austria ==
After von Trott zu Solz and others were executed in 1944, Vassiltchikov fled Berlin and traveled to Vienna, where she worked as a nurse. Her diary describes her time there as a descent from privilege to near-death, when, at the end of the war, she was found digging for food outside of a concentration camp by the United States Third Army under George S. Patton outside Gmunden, Austria, on 4 May 1945.

== Post-war ==
Vassiltchikov contracted scarlet fever and was transported to a hospital unit, after which she worked as an interpreter for US Army where she met her future husband who worked in military intelligence.

Vassiltchikov married U.S. Army Captain Peter Harnden (born in London on 9 April 1913) on 28 January 1946. They settled in Paris, where Harnden opened an architectural firm. After Harnden died in Cadaqués on 15 October 1971, Vassiltchikov moved to London where she worked on her wartime diaries.

Vassiltchikov died in London of leukemia on 12 August 1978, after which, her brother, George Vassiltchikov, edited her diaries.

Vassiltchikov was survived by her four children: Marina Harnden, 15 September 1948, Anthony Harnden, born in Paris 13 February 1951, died in Cadaqués 4 January 1999; Michael Harnden, 10 October 1954; Alexandra Harnden, 18 March 1956; her brother, Prince Yuri "Georgie" Vassiltchikov; and her sister, Princess Tatiana von Metternich-Winneburg, who was married to Paul Alfons von Metternich-Winneburg, a descendant of Prince Klemens Wenzel von Metternich, wrote two books about her wartime experiences, and worked with the International Red Cross.

Vassiltchikov's diaries were published by Chatto and Windus, Ltd, in the UK, in 1985, by Random House in 1987, and Vintage Books in 1988.

== See also ==
- 20 July Plot
- Adam von Trott zu Solz
- Bombing of Berlin
- Franz Six
- Kreisau Circle
- anti-Nazi resistance
- Tatiana von Metternich-Winneburg
- World War II

== Bibliography ==
- Vassiltchikov, Marie (1988) [1985]. Berlin Diaries 1940-1945. New York, NY: Vintage. ISBN 978-0394757773.
- Metternich, Tatiana (2004) [1976]. Five Passports in a Shifting Europe. Gardners Books. ISBN 978-1904027287.
- Metternich, Tatiana (1976). Purgatory of fools: A memoir of the aristocrats' war in Nazi Germany. Quadrangle/New York Times Book Co. ISBN 978-0812906912.
