= Boris Reznik =

Russian politician and journalist

- Борис Резник
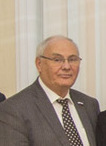
- Reznik in 2015

Member of the State Duma
- In office 18 January 2000 – 5 October 2016

Personal details
- Born: Boris Lvovich Reznik; 12 February 1940 Rzhev, Russia, Soviet Union
- Died: 27 January 2018 (aged 77) Düsseldorf, Germany
- Party: Party of Growth (2016–2018)
- Other political affiliations: United Russia (2007–2016)
- Boris Reznik's voice From the Echo of Moscow program, 25 March 2013

Boris Lvovich Reznik (Russian: Борис Львович Резник; 12 February 1940 – 27 January 2018) was a Russian politician and journalist who had served as a member of the State Duma from 2000 to 2016.

He was an honorary citizen of Khabarovsk.

== Biography ==
=== Early life ===
Boris Reznik was born on 12 February 1940 in Rzhev, Kalinin region (present-day Tver Oblast).

His father, Lev, served in the war, while he lived with his mother his in Moscow during the evacation.

He became a journalist while still in the 4th grade of school, writing an article for the newspaper Pionerskaya Pravda. He studied at the Faculty of Journalism of Moscow State University, but according to some sources, he did not graduate.

=== Journalism and social activities ===
In 1959, he worked for the newspapers "Moskovsky Komsomolets" and "Evening Moscow". As a journalist, he covered events on Damansky Island.

In 1964, at the age of 24, Reznik, who was out of conviction, joined the Communist Part of the Soviet Union.

In 1971, he was elected secretary of the party organization of correspondents for central newspapers in the Far East. In 1981, he graduated from the Khabarovsk Higher Party School. In the same year, he went to work at Izvestia, where he worked his way up from his own correspondent to the head of the Far Eastern department. Reazni was a delegate to the last XXVIII Party Congress of the Supreme Soviet.

He didn't leave the CPSU, and had been keeping his party card. In 1991, an article was published on the front page of Izvestia, in which Reznik provided data on the support of the State Emergency Committee by the chief of the General Staff of the Soviet Army, General Mikhail Moiseyev, after which he was removed from the post of minister of defense by Soviet President Mikhail Gorbachev.

In 1997, he nominated himself as the editor-in-chief of Izvestia, but recused himself. He was published in many publications, including in the magazine "Ogonyok".

He wrote about organized crime, about connections with it among law enforcement officers, about corruption in the power structures of the Far East. He became the author of numerous essays, 6 books, scripts for 26 documentaries, 16 of which are dedicated to Japan.

In 2016, he was elected a member of the Russian Writers' Union. He was the secretary of the Union of Journalists of Russia, and was awarded the Golden Gong prize by the Union of Journalists of the Soviet Union and Russia.

He was involved in social activities. He headed the "Nadezhda" fund for helping seriously ill children, which collected and allocated more than 100 million rubles for the development of children's healthcare. He was elected "for special services in protecting children's health" as an honorary professor at the Institute of Maternal and Child Health, Siberian Branch of the Russian Academy of Medical Sciences.

=== Political career ===
On 19 December 1999, Reznik was elected to the State Duma of the third convocation, taking office on 14 January 2000.

He had been consistently re-elected to State Duma deputies of the IV, V, VI convocations.

Earlier, he was a member of the "Regions of Russia" party. From the second term, he was party of the faction in the United Russia party, then, he joined the United Russia party in 2007.

He was the first deputy head of the Far Eastern Interregional Coordination Council of United Russia. He held the posts of deputy chairman of the State Duma Committee on Information Policy, Information Technologies and Communications, Chairman of the Subcommittee on Print Media, the Committee on Security and Anti-Corruption, the Commission for Monitoring the Reliability of Information on Income, Property and Property Liabilities Submitted by Deputies. He was also the coordinator of the parliamentary group for relations with the Japanese Parliament between 2008 and 2012, and worked on the development of improving Russian-Japanese relations.

He often went against the party lines, as he did not support the deprivation of immunity for deputy Vladimir Bessonov, refrained from depriving Gennady Gudkov of his parliamentary powers, and voted against the "Dima Yakovlev law", and did not support the "Yarovaya Law".

Regarding the "Dima Yakovlev Law," the ban on the adoption of children by US citizens, he was one of seven out of 420 legislators who voted against, and the only deputy from United Russia who voted against.

As noted in the media at the time, Reznik is involved in charity work and to this, "he understands well what now awaits seriously ill orphans in Russia".

I have no global differences with the United Russia party and the president, except for certain points on which I have my own opinion and which I always express. And, most importantly, he is always treated with respect.

— Boris Reznik on United Russia and Vladimir Putin.

After the United Russia primaries, held on 23 May 2016 in the Khabarovsk Krai, he announced numerous violations and called his fellow party members "swindlers".

He lost to member of the Khabarovsk Oblast Duma Boris Gladkikh, taking third place in the Khabarovsk single-mandate constituency and sixth on the regional list, was not included in the party list for the State Duma elections and did not take part in the party congress, linking his defeat with voting against the "Dima Yakovlev law".

On 30 June he submitted an application to leave United Russia. On July 4, he became a candidate for the State Duma on the list of the Party of Growth.

He was not registered by the election commission of the Khabarovsk Territory due to the fact that he "missed the deadline for submitting documents", after which he filed an application with the Central Election Commission of the Russian Federation regarding the "illegal refusal to register as a candidate for deputy" [54], but on August 16 withdrew the complaint and stopped fighting, noting that "in these conditions, no matter what decision the Central Election Commission makes, for me, as an undesirable candidate, participation in the ongoing election campaign loses all meaning".

== Death and funeral ==
Reznik died suddenly on 27 January 2018 at the age of 77 from illness, according to some sources, while undergoing treatment in Düsseldorf, Germany.

The staff of the Union of Journalists of Russia, Chairman of the Human Rights Council Mikhail Fedotov, journalists and heads of various media outlets, and State Duma deputies expressed their condolences. The funeral took place on 2 February at Troekurovskoye Cemetery.

== Personal life ==
He was married to his wife, Yelena Nikolayevna (née Matveyeva), who is a journalist, and they have two children: son Andrei, an astrophysicist, businessman, and daughter Ksenia, a writer, translator.

In 2015, he declared an income of 5 million rubles, 3 land plots, 2 residential buildings, 3 apartments, 3 garages, not counting the property of his wife, who was repeatedly included in the list of the richest wives of State Duma deputies from the Khabarovsk Krai, having an annual income over several years in the amount of about 10-20 million rubles.

He sued journalists who covered his parliamentary and journalistic activities, as Reznik believed, from the negative side.

The attention of journalists was also attracted by the controversial purchase of the International Press House in Khabarovsk through a business structure owned by his wife.

In this regard, he supported the bill on strengthening liability for libel, since "active slander campaigns are unfolding in many media. For this, naturally, authors and editors should be held accountable".
