= 18 km, Khabarovsk Krai =

18 km 18 км
- Settlement
- Location within Khabarovsk Krai Location within Russia
- Coordinates: 48.309167°N 135.073611°E
- Country: Russia
- Region: Khabarovsk Krai
- District: Khabarovsky District
- Time zone: UTC+10:00

18 km (Russian: 18 км) is a rural locality (a settlement) in Korfovskoye Urban Settlement of Khabarovsky District, Russia. The population was 7 as of 2012. There are 2 streets.

== Geography ==
18 km is located 22 km south of Khabarovsk (the district's administrative centre) by road. Khetsir is the nearest rural locality.
