= Sergey Kravchuk =

Russian politician

- Сергей Кравчук
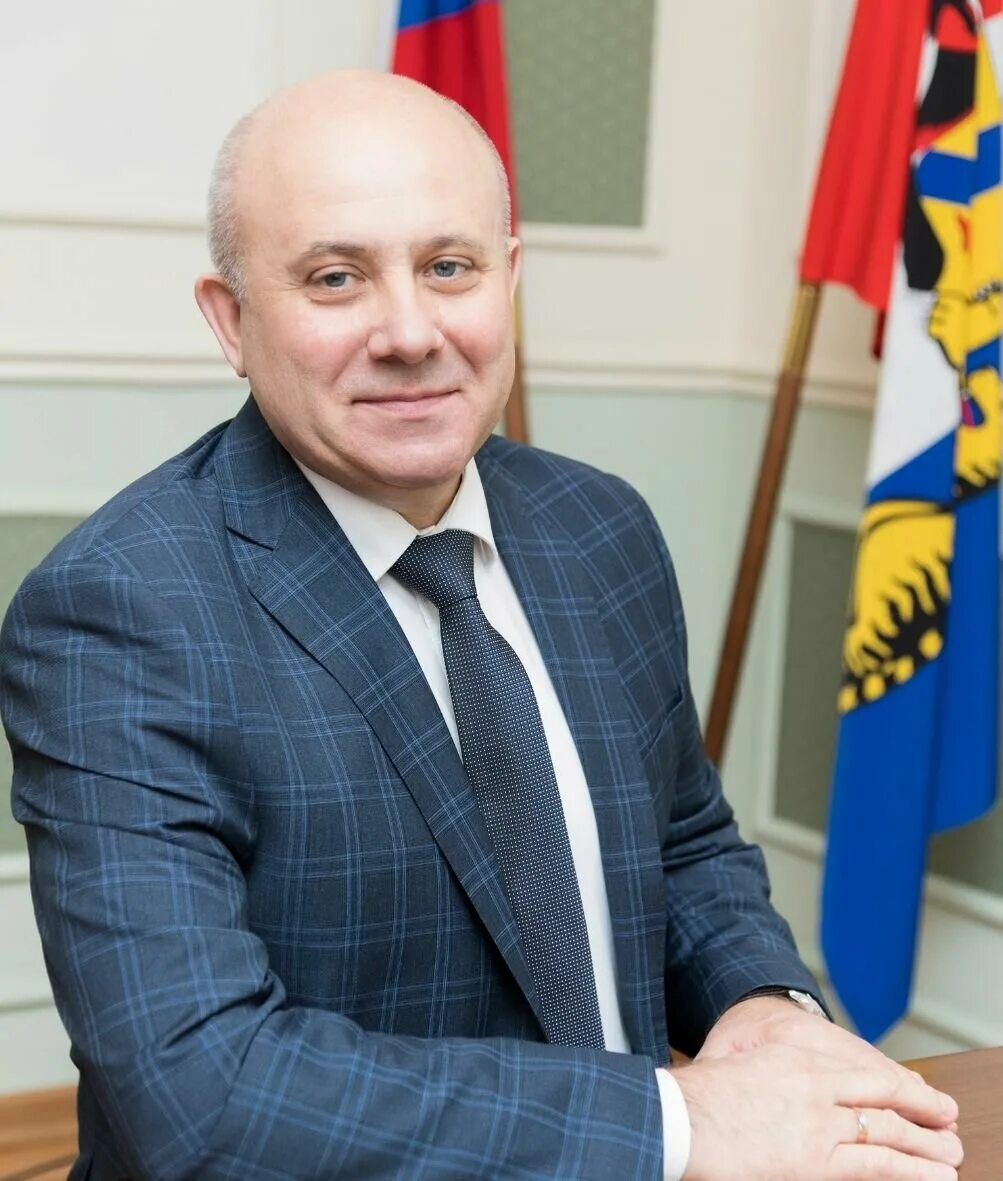

3rd Mayor of Khabarovsk
- In office 25 September 2018 – 29 September 2026
- Preceded by: Aleksandr Sokolov

Member of the State Duma
- Incumbent
- Assumed office 29 September 2026

Personal details
- Born: Sergey Anatolyevich Kravchuk; 29 August 1960 (age 66) Tsentralny, Russian SFSR, Soviet Union
- Party: United Russia

Sergey Anatolyevich Kravchuk (Russian: Сергей Анатольевич Кравчук; born on 29 August 1960) is a Russian politician who is currently the third mayor of Khabarovsk since 25 September 2018.

He is a member of the General Council of the United Russia party.

== Biography ==
Sergey Kravchuk was born on 27 August 1960 Tsentralny, Topkinsky district, Kemerovo Oblast.

In 1977, he graduated from secondary school No. 6 from Topki and got a job at the Tonkin Mechanical Plant.

From November 1978 to November 1980, he served the Soviet Army in the border troops on Sakhalin Island. In January 1981, immediately after demobilization, he began work at the Makarovskaya mine, located in the Sakhalin Oblast until August 1987.

In 1987, he entered the Khabarovsk Higher Party School, which was transformed in 1991 into the Far Eastern Social and Political Institute, where he graduated by the end of the year. After his graduation, he has worked in the Khabarovsk administration, taking the position of head of the housing maintenance department.

In October 1997, he was hired by the Khabarovsk city administration as head of the housing stock maintenance department, deputy head of the housing and communal services and housing stock maintenance department.

In 2001, he graduated from the Far Eastern Academy of Civil Service, where he studied municipal and public administration.

In 2010, he was appointed Deputy Mayor of the city, Chairman of the Committee for the Management of the Southern District (later the Industrial District, vice-mayor of the city of Khabarovsk - first deputy mayor of the city for economic issues.

On 3 April 2017, Kravchuk was appointed vice-mayor of Khabarovsk.

On 10 September 2018, Kravchuk won the election as the 3rd Mayor of Khabarovsk with 39.97% of the votes. He took office on 25 September, with thee inauguration ceremony taking place on the same day.

In July 2020, during the Khabarovsk Krai protests, Kravchuk, when confronted by a protester, believed the protests "shouldn't happen, because they are illegal." He also insisted that he had 85 new cases of the virus in the city, citing health concerns.

On 10 September 2023, Kravchuk was reelected as Mayor of Khabarovsk.

Following the 2026 Russian legislative election he became a deputy to the 9th State Duma.
