= Paul Alfons von Metternich-Winneburg =

German racing driver (1917–1992)

Prince Paul Alfons von Metternich-Winneburg

President of the Commission Sportive Internationale
- In office 1970–1975
- Preceded by: Maurice Baumgartner
- Succeeded by: Pierre Ugeux

President of the Fédération Internationale de l'Automobile
- In office 1975–1985
- Preceded by: Amaury de Merode
- Succeeded by: Jean-Marie Balestre

Personal details
- Born: 26 May 1917 Vienna, Austria
- Died: 21 September 1992 (aged 75) Geneva, Switzerland

Paul Alfons Maria Clemens Lothar Philippus Neri Felix Nicomedes Prinz von Metternich-Winneburg (26 May 1917 – 21 September 1992) was a German-Austrian racing driver and President of the Commission Sportive Internationale (CSI), before becoming President of the Fédération Internationale de l'Automobile (FIA) in 1975.

== Biography ==
Prince Paul Alfons von Metternich-Winneburg zu Beilstein, known informally as Paul Metternich, was born in Vienna in the House of Metternich, as the only son of Klemens Wenzel Lothar Michal Felix von Metternich-Winneburg zu Beilstein (1869-1930) and his Spanish wife, Doña Isabel de Silva y Carvajal (1880-1980). He was a great-grandson of the Austrian statesman Klemens von Metternich. He attended the Institut Le Rosey in Switzerland.

He fought on the Nationalist side during the Spanish Civil War. During World War II, he served as a liaison officer in the Spanish Blue Division.

In 1940 in Berlin, where he belonged to a circle of opponents of the Nazi regime, he met his future wife Tatiana Vassiltschikov, who had a position in the foreign office. They were married in Berlin-Grunewald on 6 September 1941 and lived initially at Kynžvart Castle (Schloss Königswart) in Egerland (now in the Czech Republic).

In 1945 he was expelled from Czechoslovakia and lost his property there. He moved to another family estate (from 1816), the winery Schloss Johannisberg in the Rheingau, which had been destroyed in the war. He later rebuilt it and ran the winery with his wife.

He also became a racing car driver. Among other contests, he participated in the Monte Carlo Rally and the 1956 24 Hours of Le Mans. From 1960 he was President of the Automobilclub von Deutschland. From 1975 until 1985 he was President of the worldwide automobile club FIA.

He was further engaged in the Order of Saint Lazarus charity organisation and was Grand bailiff for the German Balliwick.

In 1979 he was awarded the Order of Merit of the Federal Republic of Germany.

His wife Tatiana was a well known art patron. With his death in Geneva, the main line of the Metternich family became extinct. His widow was the last representative of the House of Metternich-Winneburg.

== Le-Mans Results ==
Year	Team	Vehicle	Team	Place	Reason
1956	Germany Prinz Paul Metternich	Mercedes-Benz 300SL	Germany Wittigo von Einsiedel	Failure	Accident

== Honors ==
- Monaco: Commander of the Order of Grimaldi (29 January 1972)

== Ancestry ==
Ancestors of Paul Alfons von Metternich-Winneburg

8. Klemens, 1st Prince of Metternich-Winneburg zu Beilstein
4. Paul Klemens, 3rd Prince of Metternich-Winneburg zu Beilstein
9. Countess Melanie Zichy-Ferraris of Zich and Vásonkeö
2. Klemens-Wenzel, 4th Prince of Metternich-Winneburg zu Beilstein
10. Count Felix Zichy-Ferraris of Zich and Vásonkeö
5. Countess Melania Zichy-Ferraris de Zich und Vásonykeö
11. Countess Emilie von Reichenbach-Lessonitz
1. Paul Alfons, 5th Prince of Metternich-Winneburg zu Beilstein
12. Francisco de Silva-Bazán y Téllez-Girón
6. Álvaro de Silva-Bazán y Fernández de Córdoba
13. María de la Encarnación Joaquina Fernández de Córdoba y Álvarez de las Asturias-Bohórquez
3. Isabel de Silva y Carvajal
14. Luis Joaquín de Carvajal y de Queralt
7. María Luisa de Carvajal Vargas y Dávalos
15. María de la Purificación Andrea Dávalos y Portillo

== Literature ==
- "Paul Alfons Fürst von Metternich-Winneburg", Der Spiegel, 13 September, no. 40, 1992, archived from the original on May 4, 2014
