= Vyazemsky Lane =

Side street in Saint Petersburg, Russia

Coordinates: 59°58′18″N 30°18′07″E

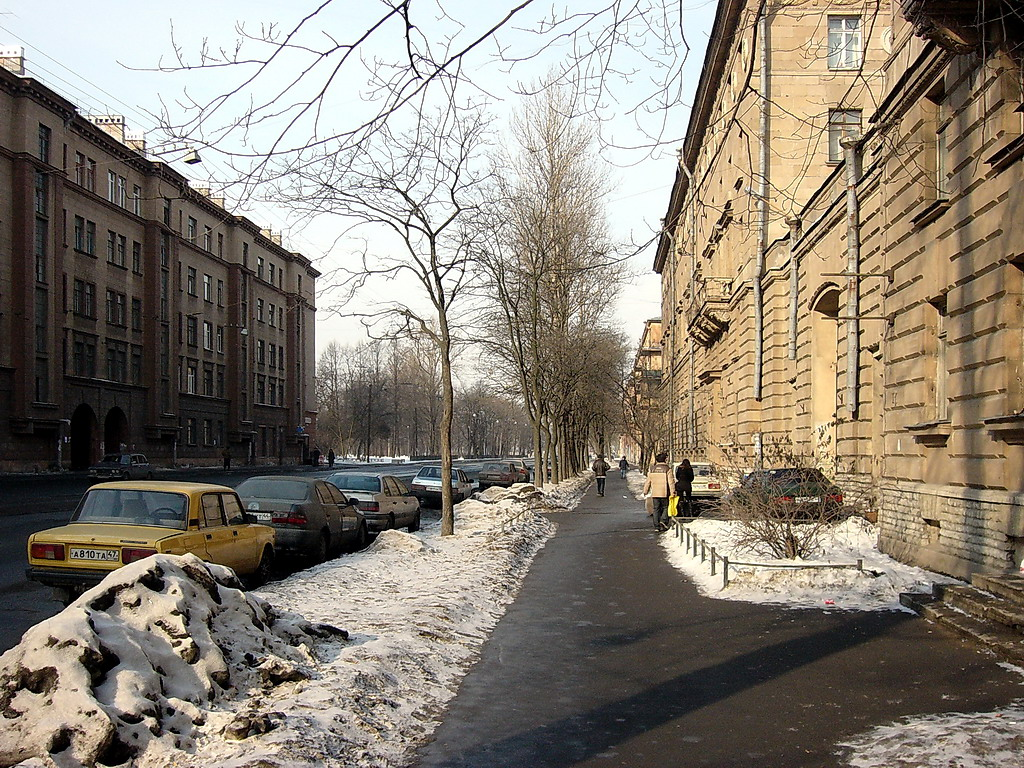
Vyazemsky Lane

Vyazemsky Lane (Russian: Вя́земский переу́лок) is a side street in Petrogradsky District of Saint Petersburg, Russia. It connects Professora Popova Street with Sand Embankment.

== Naming ==
In the 19th century this street was named Lavalev Street (у́лица Лава́лева), then Zadny Lane (За́дний переу́лок), Glukhoy Lane (Глухо́й переу́лок), and finally Vyazemsky Lane, after the landowners, the Vyazemskys family. It was renamed Belgorodskaya Street (Белгоро́дская у́лица) on December 15, 1952, but a year later, on January 4, 1954, the original name was restored.

== Street ==
The street is approximately 500 meters long. Although it is named as side street, it is wider (30 m) than main avenues of Petrogradsky District: Kamennoostrovsky Prospekt and Bolshoy Avenue (both approximately 20 meters).

There are several apartment buildings, the 32nd polyclinic (house number 3), the dormitory of Saint Petersburg State University of Information Technologies, Mechanics and Optics (number 5-7), and Vyazemsky Garden.
