= Tatiana von Metternich-Winneburg =

Russian-born German patron of the arts (1915–2006)

Princess Tatiana
- Princess Tatiana in the 1980s
- Born: Princess Tatiana Hilarionovna Vassiltchikov; 1 January 1915; Saint Petersburg, Russia
- Died: 26 July 2006 (aged 91); Johannisberg, Hesse, Germany
- Spouse: Paul Alfons von Metternich-Winneburg
- Resting place: Schloss Johannisberg
- Occupations: Writer; artist; patron of the arts
- Organizations: Red Cross; Order of St. Lazarus; Rheingau Musik Festival
- Relatives: Marie Vassiltchikov (sister)

Princess Tatiana von Metternich-Winneburg (born Princess Tatiana Hilarionovna Vassiltchikova; Russian: Татья́на Илларио́новна Васи́льчикова; 1 January 1915 – 26 July 2006) was a Russian aristocrat, philanthropist, artist, and patron of the arts. She published her books and watercolours under the name Tatiana von Metternich. She supported charity, especially the Red Cross and the Order of St. Lazarus, which she served as Grand Bailiff for Germany. She was a founding member of the Rheingau Musik Festival, made parts of Schloss Johannisberg available as concert venues for the festival and served as the president of its Kuratorium until her death.

== Family ==
Tatiana von Metternich-Winneburg was born in Saint Petersburg, the second daughter of Prince Hilarion Sergueïevitch Vassiltchikov (1881–1969), a member of the Russian Imperial Parliament Fourth Duma, and his wife, the former Princess Lidiya Leonidovna Vyazemskaya (1886–1946). On 6 September 1941 in Berlin-Grunewald, she married Paul Alfons von Metternich-Winneburg, Prince of Metternich-Winneburg, Grandee of Spain, Duke of Portella and Count of Königswart (1917–1992), son of Clemens von Metternich, Prince of Metternich-Winneburg, and Isabel de Silva y Carvajal, Countess of Castillejo.

== Biography ==
The family fled Russia in 1919, following the Bolshevik October Revolution by joining a group of people who had been evacuated by ships of the Royal Navy. King George V of the United Kingdom was a cousin of the last Tsar and maternal nephew of widowed Empress Maria Feodorovna. King George V persuaded Prime Minister David Lloyd George to send a ship to Crimea to save his aunt, but the Empress refused to leave unless those who wished to flee the country with her were also rescued. The British sent additional ships to evacuate the entire group, including the Vassiltchikov family.

They took refuge, initially in France, where she and her sister Princess Marie Vassiltchikov (1917–1978) were educated at the Lycée of St Germain-en-Laye. She studied painting in Munich and later the family rejoined her father in Lithuania where she worked as a secretary at the British Embassy. She moved to England but was unable to get a work permit, so she moved to Germany, where she eventually employed as a translator by the German Foreign Office. Her sister Marie joined her shortly before they settled in Berlin. Due to the tendency of the Nazi party members to bypass the Foreign Office staff when formulating policy, as described in the Berlin diaries by Princess Marie, the Foreign Office effectively became a gathering place for civilian members of the anti-Nazi resistance. Her sister kept diaries of her life in the plotters' circle. Princess Marie described these years in her memoirs The Berlin Diaries 1940–1945 of Marie "Missie" Vassiltchikov (1985).

Tatiana met her future husband, who was then an ordinary soldier in the German army. He was a half-Austrian and half-Spanish member of the Metternich family. His great-grandfather was Austrian Chancellor Prince Klemens von Metternich, who established a lasting peace at the Congress of Vienna in 1815. In recognition of the Chancellor's services, the Emperor of Austria gave him a title and the estate of Johannisberg on the Rhine. In the Spanish Civil War, he volunteered on the Nationalist side to fight with his cousins and friends. They were married on 6 September 1941 by Father Shahovski, later Archbishop of John of San Francisco. As a son of a Spanish noble woman with close links to Spain, the Spanish Embassy provided support for the wedding.

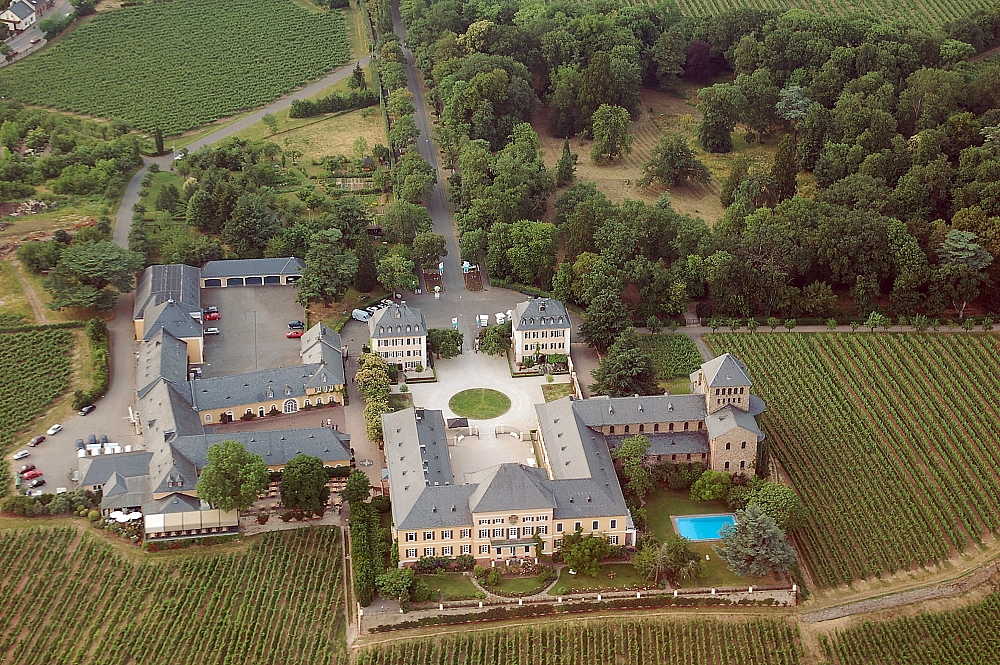
Schloss Johannisberg, aerial view from the south, 2006

The couple lived in Berlin and then in the Metternich family's Schloss Königswart in the Egerland (now in the Czech Republic). During the war, she administered the Metternich estates while her husband served in the German army. When her husband told her of his transfer to the Russian front, she went to Army HQ without his knowledge to ask for a transfer. A few days later, she received a call informing her that her husband would be transferred as Liaison officer to the Spanish Blue Division.

After the expulsion of Germans from Czechoslovakia in 1945, they lived in Schloss Johannisberg, the family's estate in Geisenheim, in the Rheingau. It had been destroyed by bombing in 1942. They rebuilt the estate and ran the winery. The East Wing was restored, but not as living quarters, rather it was turned into a hall for indoor tennis. In collaboration with Henkell & Söhnlein, a winery and member of the Oetker Group, they created the sparkling wine, "Fürst von Metternich". In 1974, they shared ownership of the castle and the winery with the Oetker Group. After her husband's death in 1992, she sold the property completely to Oetker, but retained the right to live on the premises.

Tatiana von Metternich published several books, some of them illustrated with her own watercolours. In 1976, she published her memoirs under the title Tatiana: Five Passports in a Shifting Europe, which she updated and republished in 1988 as Tatiana: Full Circle in a Shifting Europe.

In 1987, she was a founding member of the Rheingau Musik Festival, together with Michael Herrmann, Claus Wisser, Carl Jung, Walter Fink and others. She made parts of Schloss Johannisberg available as concert venues for the festival, turning the East Wing of the building into a concert hall. After her husband's death, the hall was named "Fürst-von-Metternich-Saal". Concerts of sacred music are performed in the Basilika; chamber music, including the annual composer's portrait, in the Fürst-von-Metternich-Saal; open-air concerts are performed in various courts; and the annual "Sommerfest" takes place on all public grounds of the estate. She served as the first president of the festival's curators until her death and was kept on the list as "Gründungsvorsitzende" (founding president).

Upon her husband's death in 1992 she faced that he had left a considerable portion of his fortune to a mistress, which meant she was forced to sell her remaining share of Schloss Johannisberg to the Oetker family. She was permitted to remain at the Schloss until her death; suffering ill health in her last years. She adopted a relative, Don Alvaro de Salinas, as her heir.

She sponsored charity projects, especially in the Order of Saint Lazarus, which she joined in 1978. She succeeded her husband as the organization's "Grand Bailiff" in Germany until her death at Schloss Johannisberg on 26 July 2006. She and her husband are buried next to the Basilika of Schloss Johannisberg.

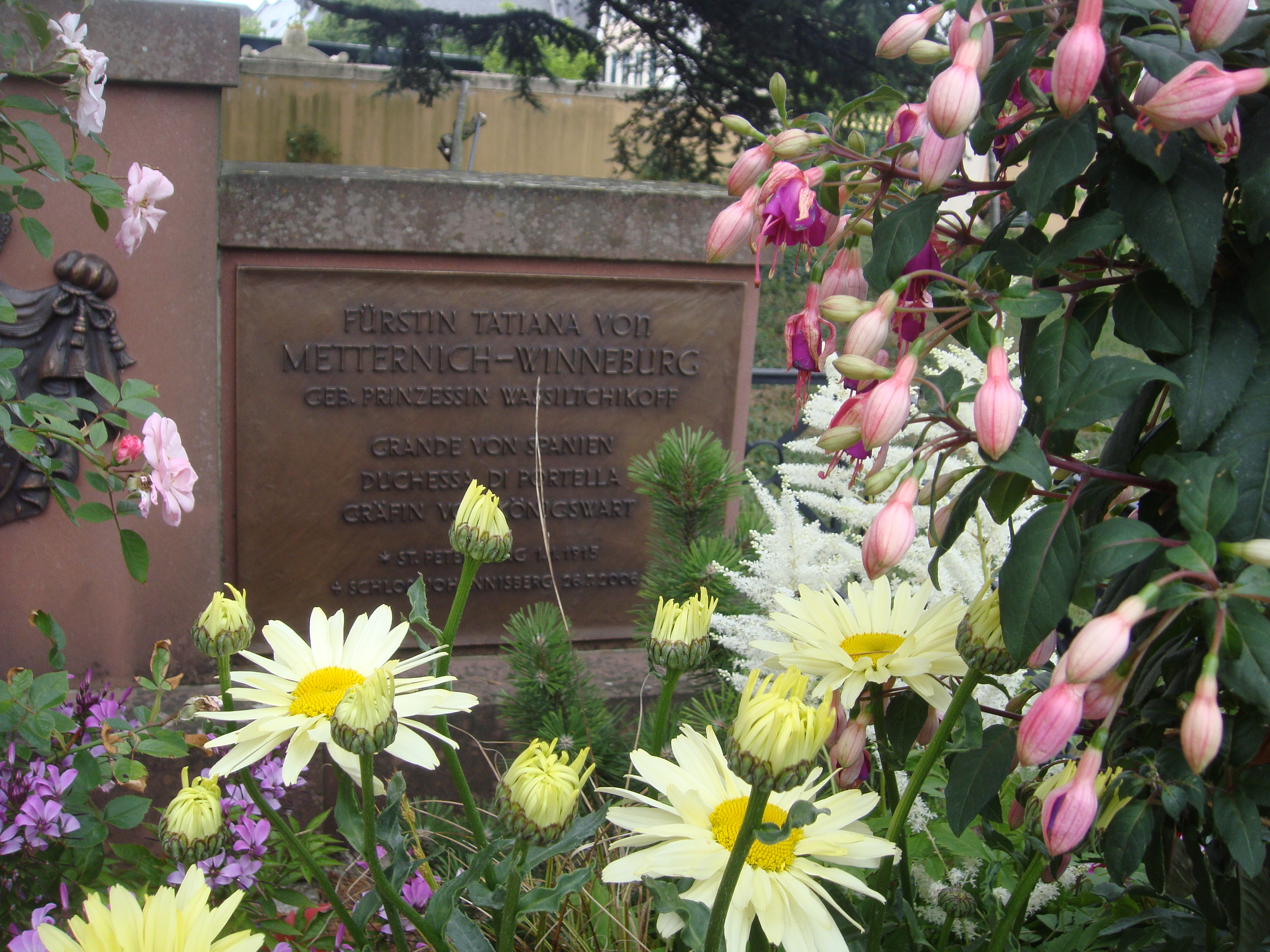
Grave of Tatiana von Metternich-Winneburg next to the Basilika of Schloss Johannisberg

== Awards ==
- 1970: Award of Honour (Ehrenzeichen) of the German Red Cross
- 1990: Order of Merit of the Federal Republic of Germany, 1st class
- 1999: Georg August Zinn Medal
- 2001: Wilhelm Leuschner Medal, the highest award of the state of Hesse
- 2003: Ring of Honour (Ehrenring) of the District of Rheingau-Taunus

== Selected publications ==
- Tatiana Metternich: Purgatory of fools: A memoir of the aristocrats' war in Nazi Germany 1976 ISBN 978-0812906912
- Tatiana Metternich-Wassiltchikow: Was wird aus Russland? Der dornige Weg in die Demokratie, Ullstein, Frankfurt am Main 1992, ISBN 3-548-34999-4
- Tatiana Metternich: "Pfauenthron / Peacock Throne: Reisetagebuch / Travelling Chronicle Johannisberg, Teheran, Persepolis, German/English, Modul-Verlag, Wiesbaden, 2002, ISBN 3-9806679-5-2
- Tatiana Metternich: Tatiana: Five passports in a shifting Europe, 1976 ISBN 9780434465255

== Sources ==
- Marie Vassiltchikov: The Berlin Diaries 1940–1945 of Marie "Missie" Vassiltchikov, The Estate of Marie Harnden, 1985
