= Boris Gladkikh =

Russian politician

- Борис Гладких
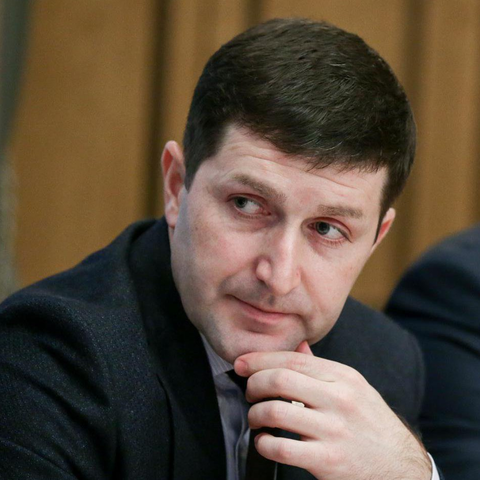

Member of the State Duma for Khabarovsk Krai
- Incumbent
- Assumed office 5 October 2016
- Preceded by: constituency re-established
- Constituency: Khabarovsk (No. 69)

Personal details
- Born: 16 February 1983 (age 43) Olovyannaya, Chita Oblast, Russian SFSR, USSR
- Party: United Russia
- Children: 2
- Education: Far Eastern State Transport University; RANEPA

Boris Mikhailovich Gladkikh (Russian: Борис Михайлович Гладких; born 16 February 1983, Olovyannaya) is a Russian political figure and a deputy of the 7th and 8th State Dumas.

Gladkikh started his career in public service in 2010 as he was appointed assistant to the deputy of the 5th State Duma Viktor Pleskachevsky. From 2014 to 2016, he served as a deputy of the Legislative Duma of Khabarovsk Krai. On 18 September 2016 he was elected to the 7th State Duma from the Khabarovsk constituency. In September 2021, he was re-elected for the 8th State Duma.
