= Chekunda =

Chekunda Чекунда
- Selo
- Interactive map of Chekunda
- Location of Chekunda Chekunda (Khabarovsk Krai)
- Coordinates: 50°52′N 132°15′E
- Country: Russia
- Federal subject: Khabarovsk Krai
- Administrative district: Verkhnebureinsky District

Population
  - Estimate (2021): 166 )
- Time zone: UTC+10 (MSK+7)
- Postal code: 682090
- OKTMO ID: 08614410101

Chekunda (Russian: Чекунда) is a rural locality (a selo) in Verkhnebureinsky District of Khabarovsk Krai, Russia, located on the left bank of the Bureya River.

== Transportation ==
Chekunda lies on a branch line that runs from Izvestkovy, on the Trans-Siberian Railway, to Chegdomyn. The line meets with the Baikal–Amur Mainline at Novy Urgal.

== Climate ==
Chekunda has a monsoon-influenced humid continental climate (Köppen climate classification Dwb) with extreme variation in seasonal temperatures. The winters are extreme for a place located at this latitude and colder than many localities from further north. Indeed, Chekunda may be the coldest known location with a humid continental climate. The summers are warm to hot and just long enough to prevent a subarctic climate (Dwc) classification. Precipitation is heavily concentrated in the warmest months.

Climate data for Chekunda
Month	Jan	Feb	Mar	Apr	May	Jun	Jul	Aug	Sep	Oct	Nov	Dec	Year
Record high °C (°F)	−1.3 (29.7)	2.0 (35.6)	18.0 (64.4)	28.9 (84.0)	33.8 (92.8)	39.6 (103.3)	37.1 (98.8)	34.0 (93.2)	30.1 (86.2)	23.4 (74.1)	9.7 (49.5)	−0.3 (31.5)	39.6 (103.3)
Mean daily maximum °C (°F)	−24.8 (−12.6)	−15.8 (3.6)	−3.2 (26.2)	8.8 (47.8)	17.9 (64.2)	24.3 (75.7)	26.8 (80.2)	24.0 (75.2)	17.4 (63.3)	6.9 (44.4)	−10.0 (14.0)	−23.3 (−9.9)	4.8 (40.6)
Daily mean °C (°F)	−31.5 (−24.7)	−24.8 (−12.6)	−12.6 (9.3)	1.6 (34.9)	9.8 (49.6)	16.5 (61.7)	20.0 (68.0)	17.7 (63.9)	10.7 (51.3)	0.4 (32.7)	−16.1 (3.0)	−29.0 (−20.2)	−2.4 (27.7)
Mean daily minimum °C (°F)	−38.2 (−36.8)	−33.7 (−28.7)	−21.9 (−7.4)	−5.6 (21.9)	1.7 (35.1)	8.7 (47.7)	13.1 (55.6)	11.4 (52.5)	3.9 (39.0)	−6.2 (20.8)	−22.1 (−7.8)	−34.7 (−30.5)	−9.6 (14.7)
Record low °C (°F)	−52.2 (−62.0)	−49.3 (−56.7)	−46.0 (−50.8)	−26.5 (−15.7)	−8.4 (16.9)	−2.4 (27.7)	2.0 (35.6)	−0.9 (30.4)	−11.0 (12.2)	−24.6 (−12.3)	−44.1 (−47.4)	−51.6 (−60.9)	−52.2 (−62.0)
Average precipitation mm (inches)	6.4 (0.25)	5.9 (0.23)	9.7 (0.38)	31.4 (1.24)	63.6 (2.50)	107.7 (4.24)	145.6 (5.73)	150.7 (5.93)	84.6 (3.33)	33.9 (1.33)	18.1 (0.71)	10.6 (0.42)	668.2 (26.29)
Average precipitation days (≥ 0.1 mm)	7.7	5.8	6.2	9.5	13.9	16.6	16.9	18.4	15.8	9.7	10.0	9.7	140.2
Average relative humidity (%)	71.7	68.2	63.4	60.1	63.4	70.4	78.5	80.7	74.8	67.8	76.2	73.5	70.7
Mean monthly sunshine hours	147	192	235	208	221	240	218	182	167	158	139	127	2,234
Source: climatebase.ru (1936-2012)
