= 24 km =

24 km 24 км
- Settlement
- Location within Khabarovsk Krai Location within Russia
- Coordinates: 48.262222°N 135.053056°E
- Country: Russia
- Region: Khabarovsk Krai
- District: Khabarovsky District
- Time zone: UTC+10:00

24 km (Russian: 24 км) is a rural locality (a settlement) in Korfovskoye Urban Settlement of Khabarovsky District, Russia. The population was 81 as of 2012. There are 2 streets.

== Geography ==
24 km is located 27 km south of Khabarovsk (the district's administrative centre) by road. Korfovsky is the nearest rural locality.
