= Kynžvart Castle =

Coordinates: 50°0′15″N 12°36′20″E

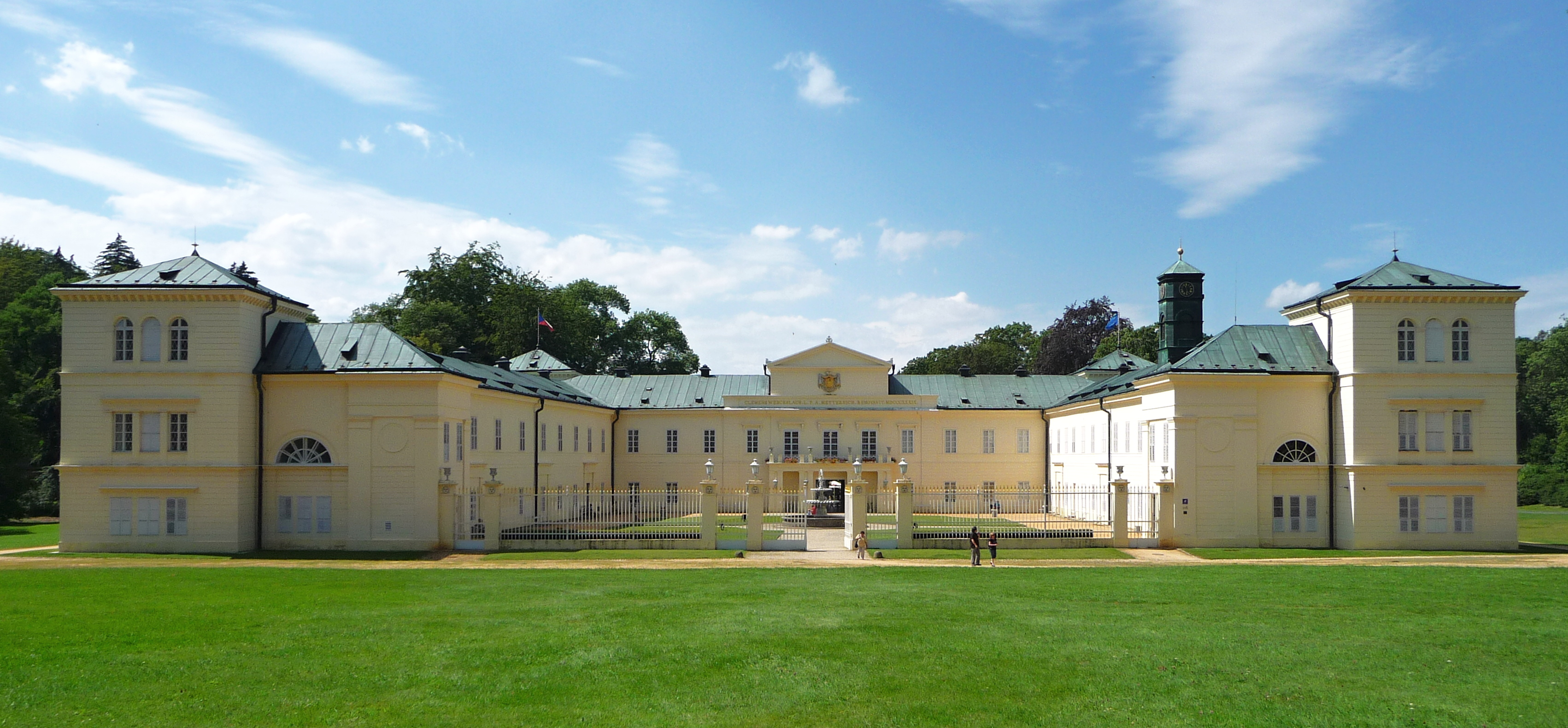
Kynžvart Castle in 2009

Kynžvart Castle (Czech: Zámek Kynžvart; German: Schloss Königswart) is a historic château located near Lázně Kynžvart in the Cheb District of the Czech Republic. The building's architecture is in the neoclassical style. After extensive renovations, the castle was reopened to the public in 2000. A guided tour takes visitors through 25 rooms of the castle.

== History ==
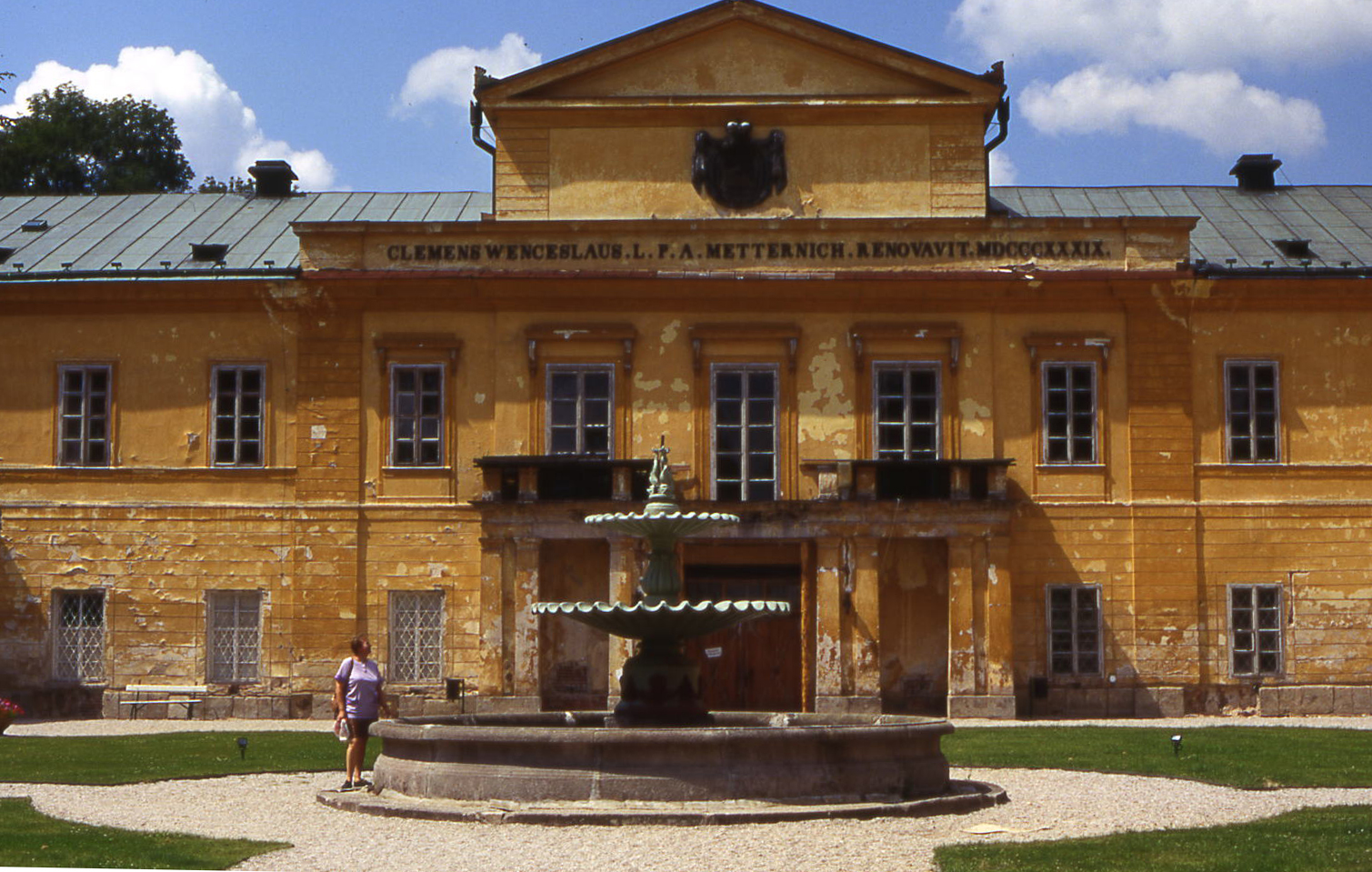
The castle in 1995, before renovations

The first Schloss Königswart, built before 1600, collapsed. After the Battle of White Mountain during the Thirty Years' War, the remains of the castle were confiscated and by 1630 granted to the Metternich family. From 1682 to 1691, Count Philipp Emmerich von Metternich (1621-1698) turned the decayed ruins into a Baroque residence. From 1821 to 1836, the Austrian Chancellor Klemens Wenzel von Metternich remodeled the building in the neoclassical style with the help of architect Pietro Nobile.

The castle was confiscated from the Metternich family in 1945 by the Czechoslovak government.

The castle has a library that includes over 200 examples of incunabula, medieval manuscripts, valuable prints, scientific books, and scientific encyclopedias. In 1828, a museum was founded to display the castle's natural science collections, coins, historical and technological curiosities, manuscripts, ancient Egyptian monuments, marble sculptures, and pieces of Oriental art.

Since 1830 the castle has been home to the mummified remains of Qenamūn an Egyptian man who most likely lived during the Eighteenth Dynasty of Egypt. It is also home to the mummified remains of Pentahutres an Egyptian man who most likely lived during the Twenty-first Dynasty of Egypt.

== See also ==
- List of castles in the Czech Republic
