= Pereyaslavka =

Urban locality in Khabarovsk Krai, Russia

Coordinates: 47°58′27″N 135°03′24″E

View of Pereyaslavka (2026)

Pereyaslavka (Russian: Переяславка) is an urban-type settlement and the administrative center of Imeni Lazo District, Khabarovsk Krai, Russia. Population: 8,921 (2010 census); 10,455 (2002 census); 11,846 (1989 Soviet census).
