= Vyazemsky, Khabarovsk Krai =

Vyazemsky Вяземский
- Town
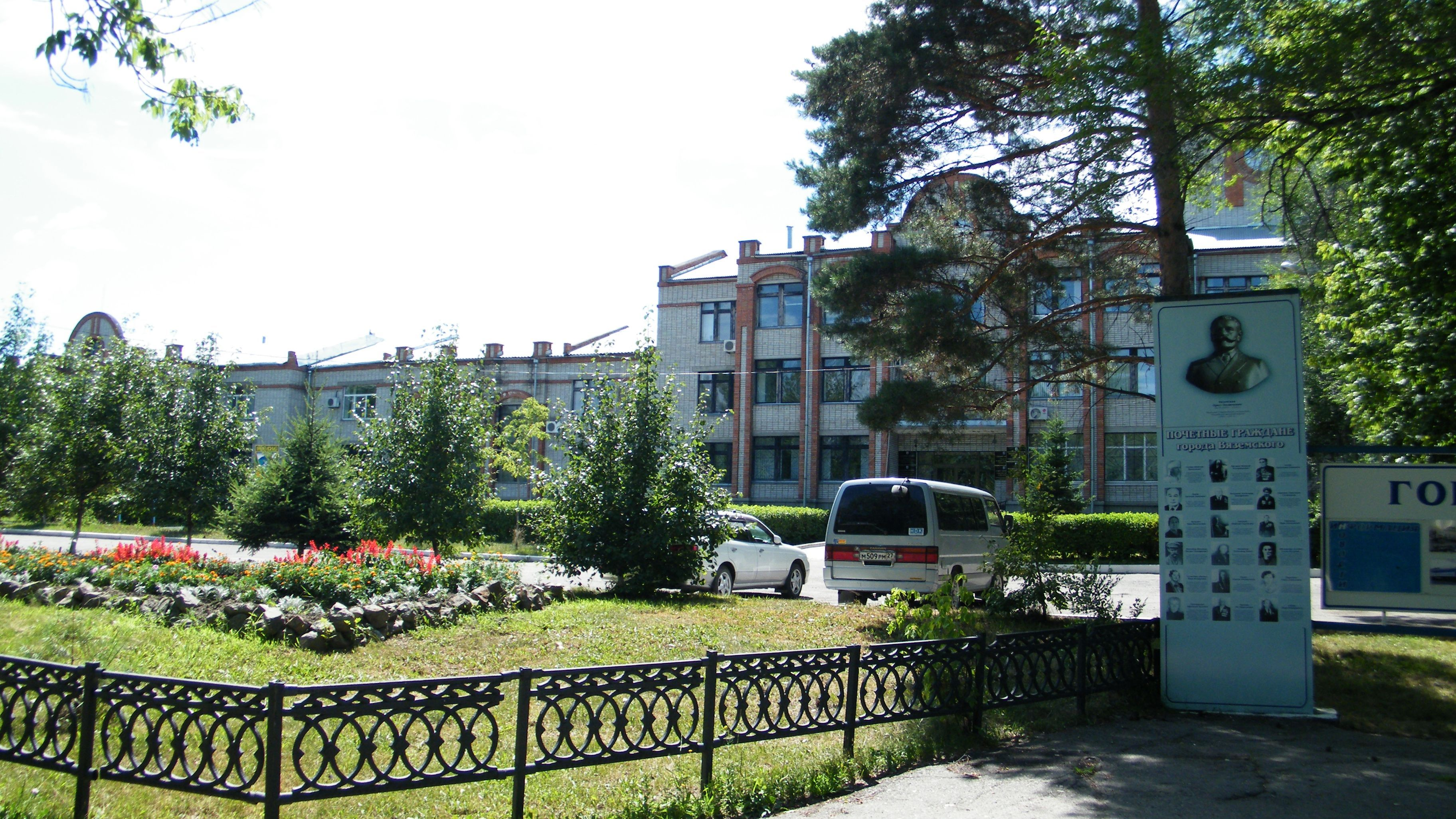
- Administration Building, Vyazemsky

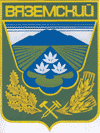
- Coat of arms
- Interactive map of Vyazemsky
- Location of Vyazemsky Vyazemsky (Khabarovsk Krai)
- Coordinates: 47°31′30″N 134°45′26″E
- Country: Russia
- Federal subject: Khabarovsk Krai
- Administrative district: Vyazemsky District
- Founded: 1895
- Town status since: 1951

Government
  - Mayor: Viktor Shashkun
- Elevation: 60 m (200 ft)

Population (2010 Census)
  - Total: 14,555
  - Estimate (2025): 12,647 (−13.1%)

Administrative status
  - Capital of: Vyazemsky District

Municipal status
  - Municipal district: Vyazemsky Municipal District
  - Urban settlement: Vyazemsky Urban Settlement
  - Capital of: Vyazemsky Municipal District, Vyazemsky Urban Settlement
- Time zone: UTC+10 (MSK+7)
- Postal code: 682950
- Dialing code: +7 42153
- OKTMO ID: 08617101001
- Website: vyazemskii.khabkrai.ru

Vyazemsky (Russian: Вя́земский) is a town and the administrative center of Vyazemsky District in Khabarovsk Krai, Russia, located 130 kilometers (81 mi) southwest of Khabarovsk, the administrative center of the krai, close to the Ussuri River and the border with China. Population: 14,555 (2010 census); 15,760 (2002 census); 18,426 (1989 Soviet census).

== History ==
It was founded in 1895 as a settlement during the construction of the railway between Khabarovsk and Vladivostok, which later became the easternmost section of the Trans-Siberian Railway. The settlement and the station were initially named Vyazemskaya (Вя́земская) after the lead engineer of the section, Orest Vyazemsky.

Urban-type settlement status was granted to it in 1938; town status was granted in 1951.

== Administrative and municipal status ==
Within the framework of administrative divisions, Vyazemsky serves as the administrative center of Vyazemsky District, to which it is directly subordinated. As a municipal division, the town of Vyazemsky is incorporated within Vyazemsky Municipal District as Vyazemsky Urban Settlement.

== Economy ==
The town's economy relies on the production of timber, foodstuffs, and construction materials, as well as on the Trans-Siberian Railway traffic.

=== Transportation ===
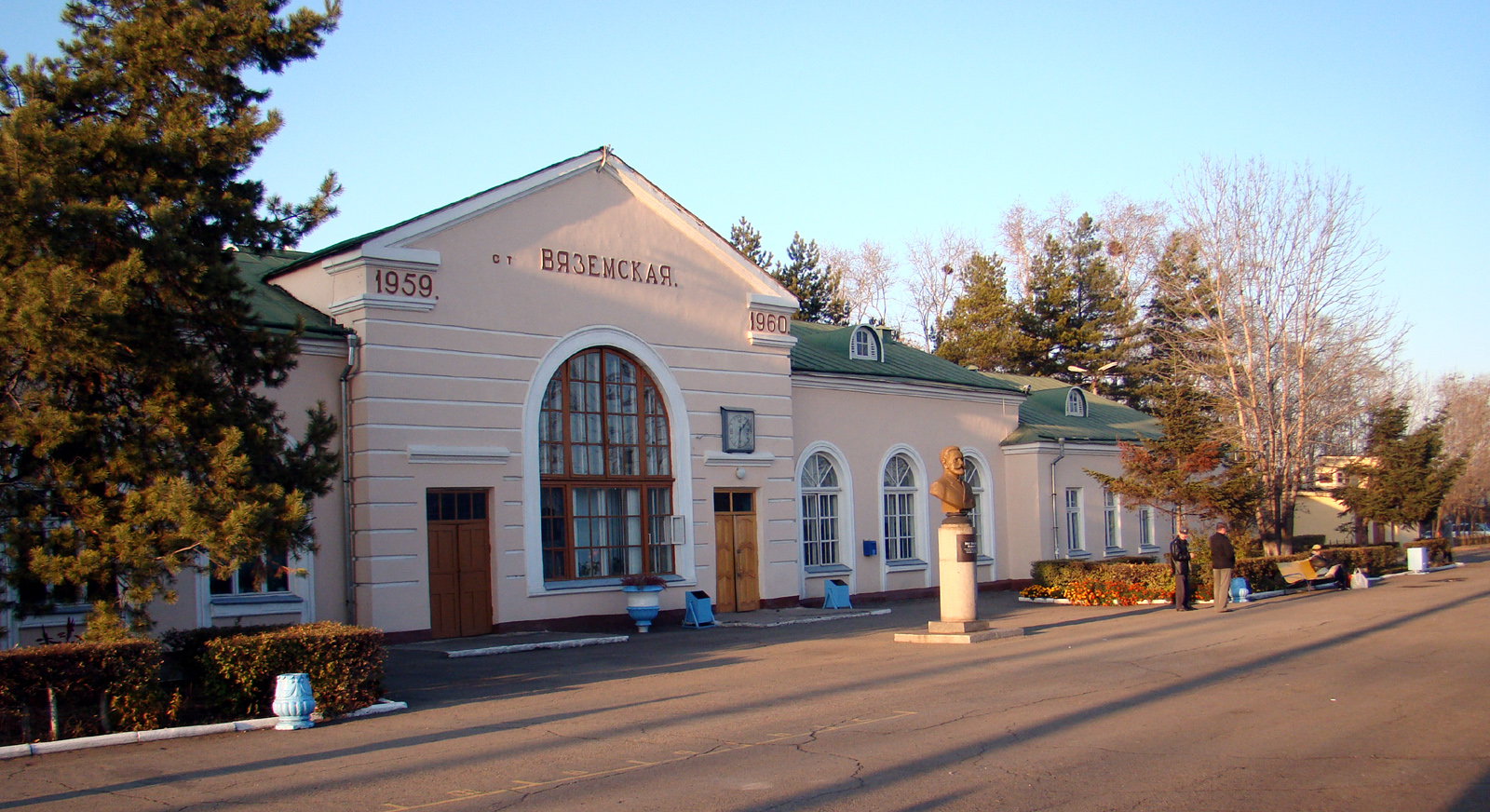
Vyazemskaya railway station

The town is served by Vyazemskaya railway station on the Trans-Siberian Railway and is the terminus for electrified suburban commuter trains from Khabarovsk. It is also on the M60 motorway.
