= Imeni Lazo District =

Imeni Lazo District район имени Лазо (Russian)
- District
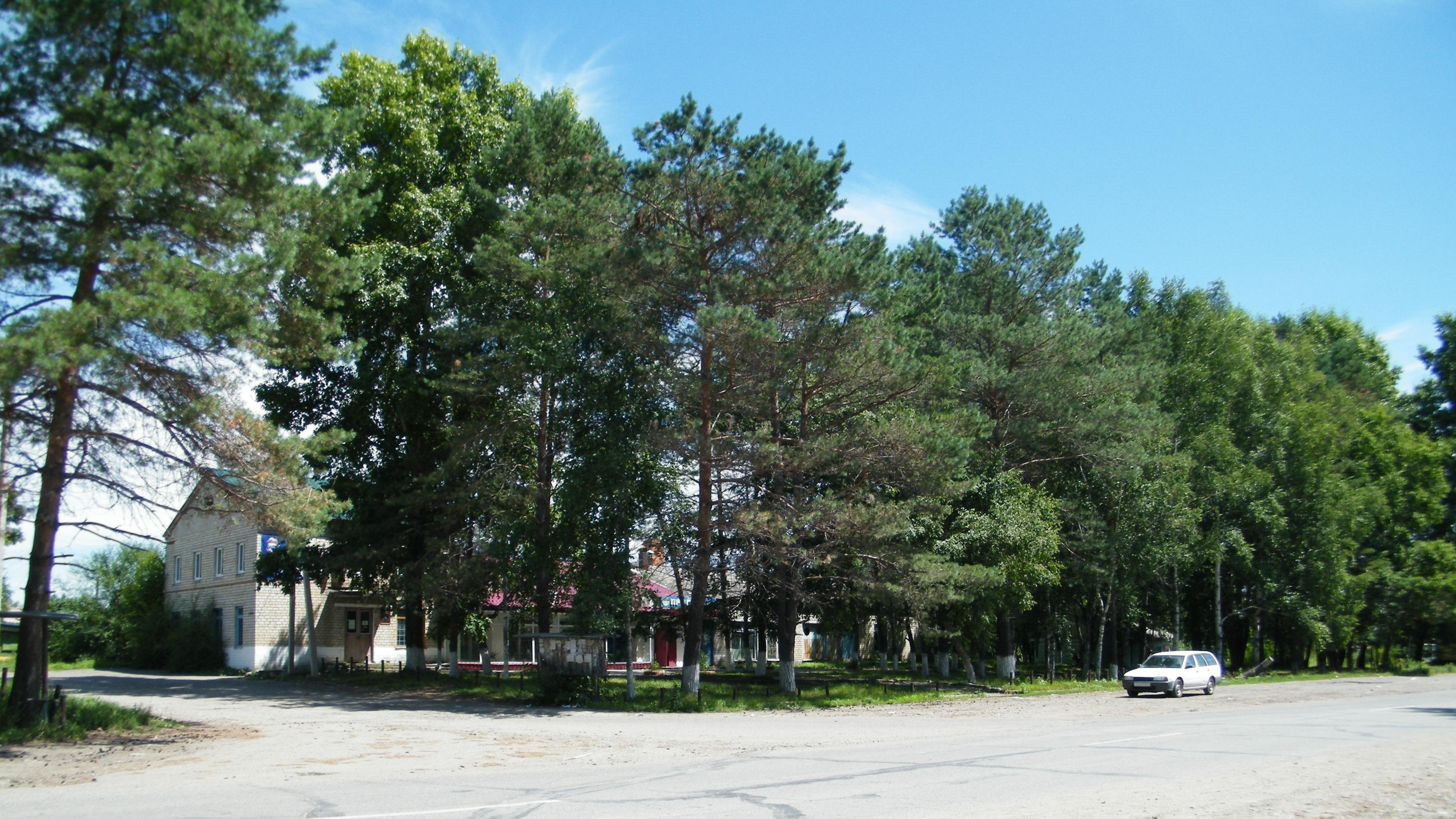
- Mogilevka Village, Imeni Lazo District

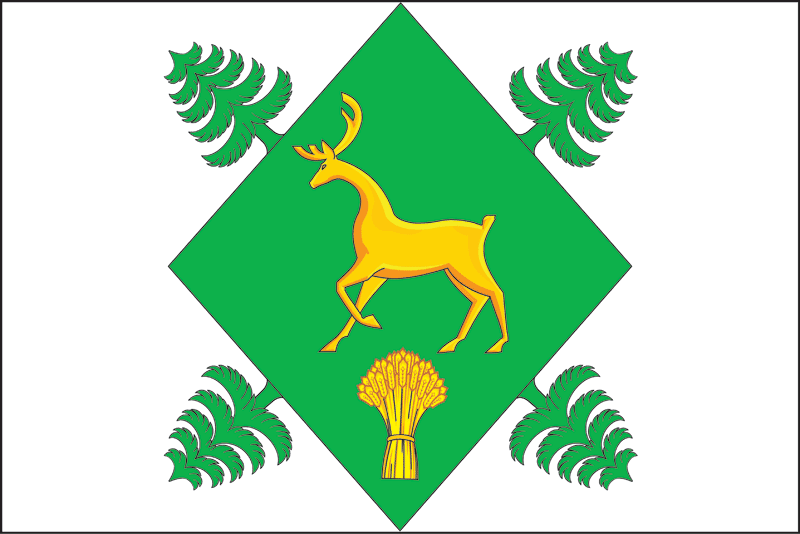
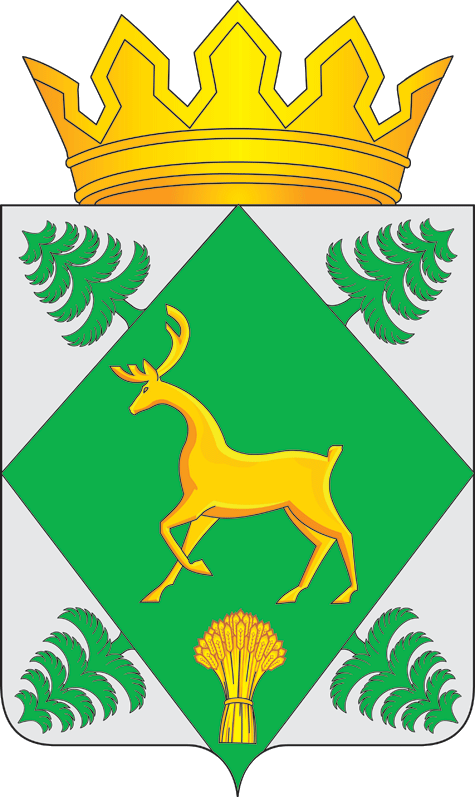
- Flag Coat of arms
- Location of Imeni Lazo District in Khabarovsk Krai
- Coordinates: 47°57′47″N 135°03′07″E
- Country: Russia
- Federal subject: Khabarovsk Krai
- Established: 1935
- Administrative center: Pereyaslavka

Area
  - Total: 31,786 km^{2} (12,273 sq mi)

Population (2010 Census)
  - Total: 46,185
  - Density: 1.4530/km^{2} (3.7632/sq mi)
  - Urban: 50.5%
  - Rural: 49.5%

Administrative structure
  - Inhabited localities: 3 urban-type settlements, 48 rural localities

Municipal structure
  - Municipally incorporated as: Imeni Lazo Municipal District
  - Municipal divisions: 3 urban settlements, 18 rural settlements
- Time zone: UTC+10 (MSK+7)
- OKTMO ID: 08624000
- Website: http://www.raionlazo.ru/

Imeni Lazo District (Russian: райо́н и́мени Лазо́) is an administrative and municipal district (raion), one of the seventeen in Khabarovsk Krai, Russia. It is located in the south of the krai. The area of the district is 31,786 square kilometers (12,273 sq mi). Its administrative center is the urban locality (a work settlement) of Pereyaslavka. Population: 46,185 (2010 census); 52,568 (2002 census); 64,780 (1989 Soviet census). The population of Pereyaslavka accounts for 19.3% of the district's total population.
