= Vyazemsky District, Khabarovsk Krai =

Vyazemsky District Вяземский район (Russian)
- District
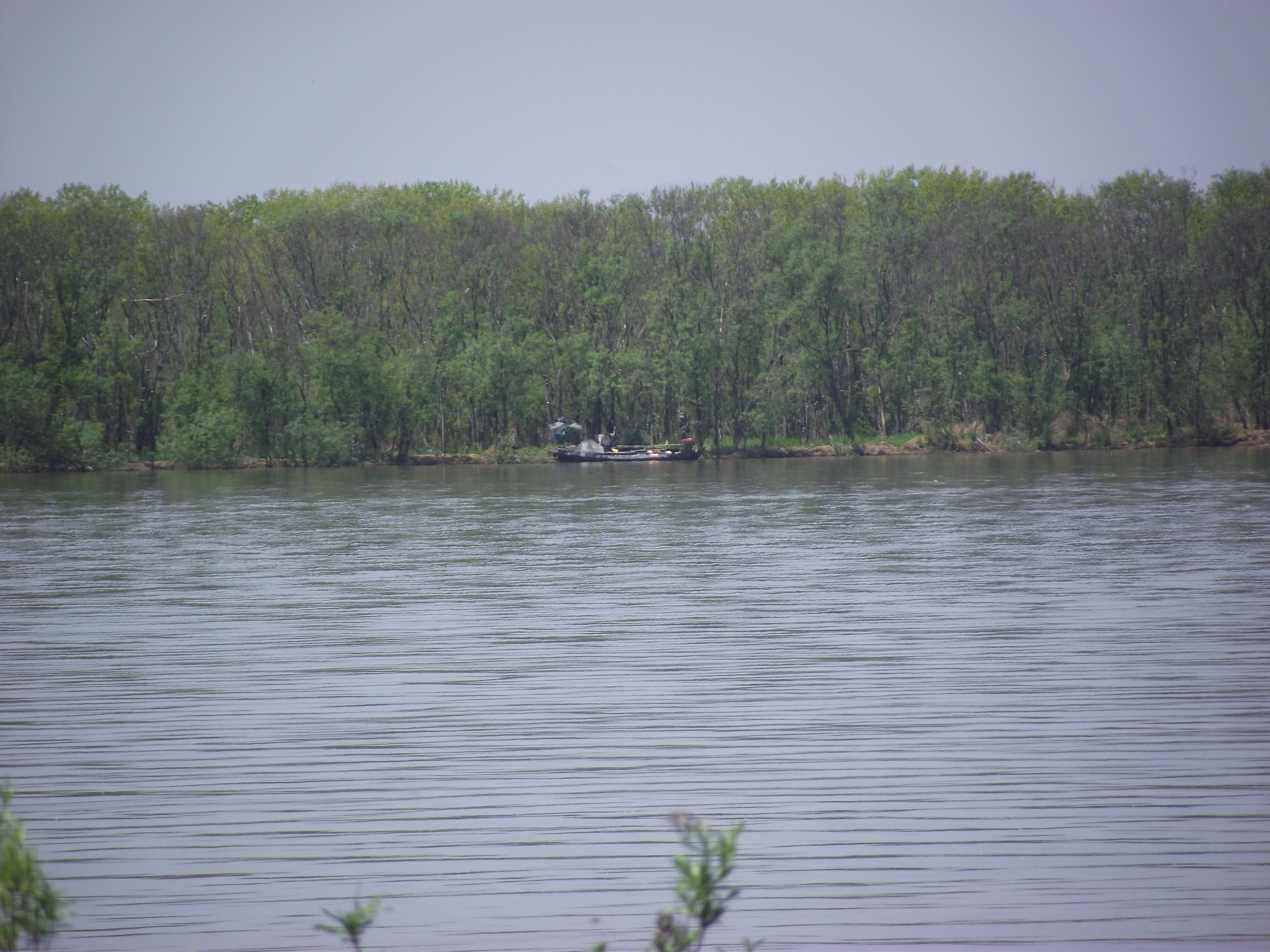
- The Ussuri River near the selo of Zabaykalskoye in Vyazemsky District

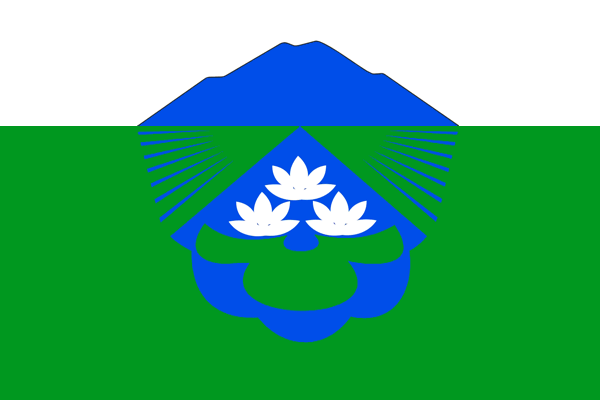
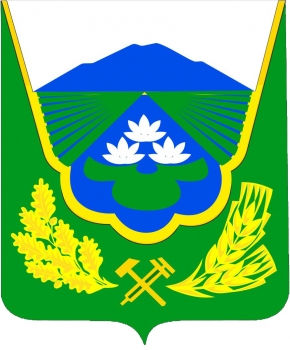
- Flag Coat of arms
- Location of Vyazemsky District in Khabarovsk Krai
- Coordinates: 47°29′N 134°46′E
- Country: Russia
- Federal subject: Khabarovsk Krai
- Established: July 22, 1934
- Administrative center: Vyazemsky

Area
  - Total: 4,318 km^{2} (1,667 sq mi)

Population (2010 Census)
  - Total: 22,974
  - Density: 5.321/km^{2} (13.78/sq mi)
  - Urban: 69.6%
  - Rural: 30.4%

Administrative structure
  - Inhabited localities: 1 cities/towns, 23 rural localities

Municipal structure
  - Municipally incorporated as: Vyazemsky Municipal District
  - Municipal divisions: 1 urban settlements, 18 rural settlements
- Time zone: UTC+10 (MSK+7)
- OKTMO ID: 08617000
- Website: http://www.vayzemskiy.ru

Population of Vyazemsky District
- 2010 Census: 22,974
- 2002 Census: 25,879
- 1989 Census: 30,505
- 1979 Census: 29,870

Vyazemsky District (Russian: Вя́земский райо́н; Chinese: 維亞澤姆斯基區) is an administrative and municipal district (raion), one of the seventeen in Khabarovsk Krai, Russia. It is located in the southwest of the krai. The area of the district is 4,318 square kilometers (1,667 sq mi). Its administrative center is the town of Vyazemsky. As of the 2010 Census, the total population of the district was 22,974, with the population of the administrative center accounting for 63.4% of that number.

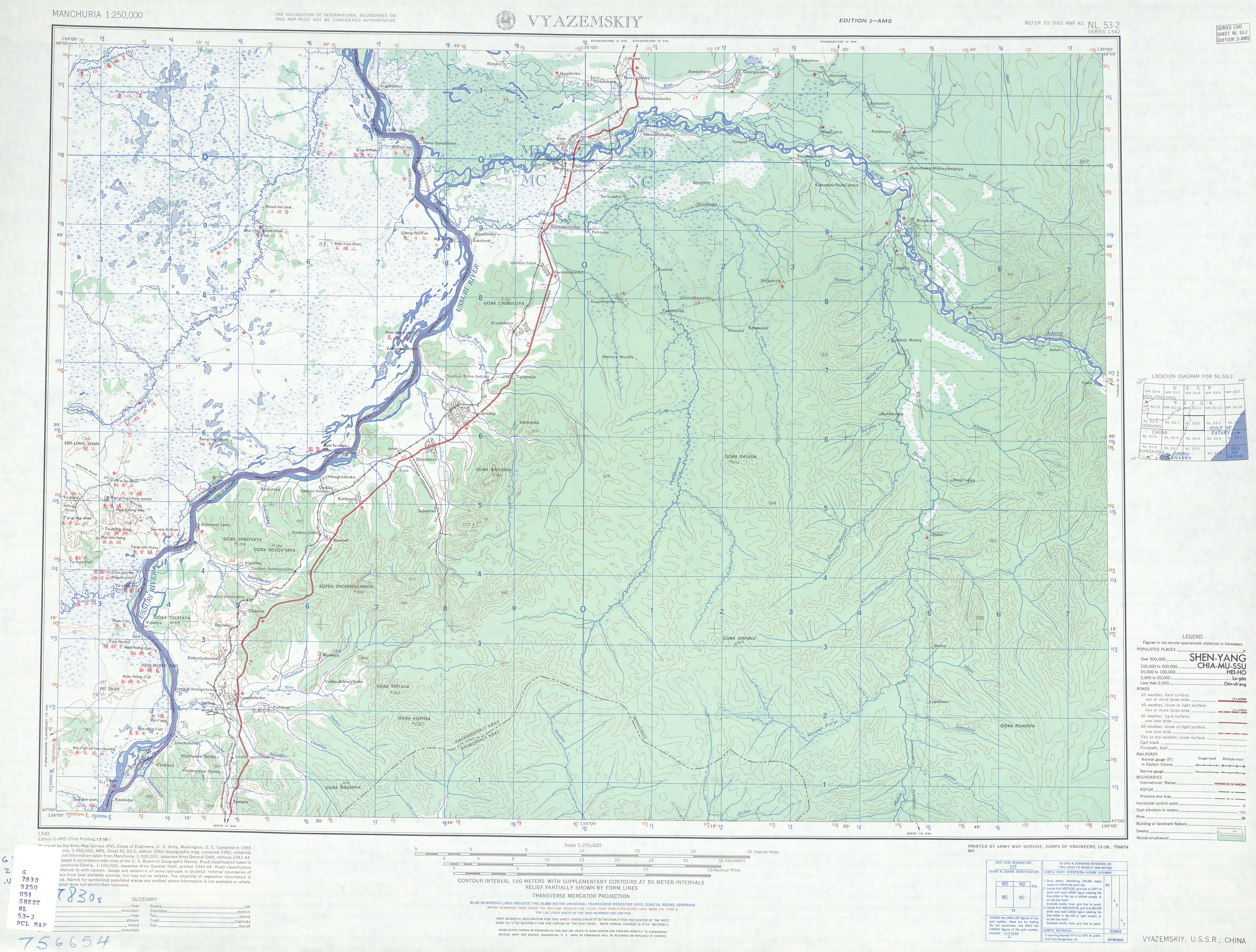
Vyazemsky (labelled as Vyazemskiy) (1955)
