= The Second Severomuysky Tunnel =

Railway tunnel in Buryatia, Russia

The Second Severomuysky Tunnel (Russian: Второй Северому́йский тонне́ль) is a 15 km long one-way Russian gauge railroad tunnel, which is currently under construction on the Baikal–Amur Mainline (BAM) in the north-western part of Buryatia, Russia. It crosses the Severomuysky Range and will go along the ‘first’ Severomuysky Tunnel constructed in 1975-2003. The new tunnel will allow to increase the annual freight capacity of that particular part of the BAM from 16 to 100 million tons.

The construction started in August 2019.

== History ==
In 2010, the Russian Railways president Vladimir Yakunin announced his ambitious plan to reconstruct the BAM to reach a freight capacity of 100 million tons by 2050. The main obstacle was the worst ‘bottleneck’ of the BAM — the aging one-way Severomuysky Tunnel.

The idea to build a new tunnel was first made public in the summer of 2018. In November, it was announced that the second tunnel would add another 68 daily trains to today’s 38, and the budget for the new tunnel construction was estimated at 190 billion rubles, excluding VAT ($2.89 billion).

In March 2019, Dmitry Bosov, the owner of Siberian Anthracite Group, sent a letter to the Russian president Vladimir Putin, proposing to build the new tunnel in 5 years and privately finance it in exchange for the Group’s priority access to the BAM and the Trans-Siberian Railway to transport 50 mln tons of cargo annually for the next 25 years. Such a deal will allow Sibanthracite to significantly increase its delivery of anthracite and metallurgical coal to the Pacific Rim. The content of the letter was disclosed by Vedomosti, a Russian business daily.

Dmitry Bosov suggested that Sibanthracite Group will require 60 billion rubles ($0.92 billion) to construct the new tunnel.

In early 2020, the project stopped following the suicide of Dmitry Bosov.

== Concession ==
According to the Russian Railways president Oleg Belozyorov, his colleagues together with the Federal Agency for Railway Transport, the Ministry of Transport, and the Federal Antimonopoly Service are still working on forming a public-private partnership that would legitimise the proposed ‘concession with lease’ and still provide Russian companies with a non-discriminatory access to the railways.

== Construction ==
In December 2019, Sibanthracite Group commissioned the US company Robbins to design and construct two Robbins Crossover XRE tunnel boring machines.

On August 20, 2019, the pre-construction work began on the site. The excavation of the 10,3 m wide tunnel was planned to begin from both sides: from the Western portal in October 2020 and from the Eastern portal in January 2021.

Based on the experience of the excavation of the first tunnel, Russian specialists claim that the Severomuysky Range is one of the most complicated subjects for tunnel excavation.
