= Dmitry Bosov =

Russian businessman (1968–2020)

- Born: Дмитрий Борисович Босов; March 27, 1968; Barnaul, Altai Krai, USSR
- Died: May 6, 2020 (aged 52); Usovo, Moscow Oblast, Russia
- Occupation: Businessman
- Spouse: Katerina Bosov
- Children: 5

Dmitry Borisovich Bosov (Russian: Дмитрий Борисович Босов; March 27, 1968 – May 6, 2020) was a Russian billionaire businessman. He was known for his work with the ALLTECH Group, the Sibanthracite Group, HC Sibir Novosibirsk, VostokCoal MC, and the Genius Fund.

Bosov was found dead in May 2020 with a gunshot wound to the head, and while his death was investigated as a suicide, one of his elder sons suspected foul play.

== Early life and education ==
Dmitry Borisovich Bosov was born on March 27, 1968, in Barnaul. His father was Head of Sales at the Transmash plant, and later, deputy general director at the Kristall plant. His mother was a teacher of English, a professor at a Moscow university.

In 1991, he graduated with honors from the faculty of Radio Electronics and Laser Technology at Bauman Moscow State Technical University (MSTU). He studied Economic Sciences and received a doctorate.

== Career ==
In 1991, he founded CJSC PIF, the Moscow representative office of the Kristall plant, where he worked as deputy director for two years and then as executive director. In 1993, he became the president of Polyexport LLP (Foreign Trade Association).

From 1995, he was director of the TransWorld Group (later known as Trans World Commodities) Moscow office.

From 1997 to 2000 he was one of the shareholders and a member of the board of directors of the Krasnoyarsk Aluminum Plant.

In 2000, he sold his KrAZ shares. After that, together with his colleagues at Bauman MSTU, he established the ALLTECH Group and took up investment projects in Russia. He was the chairman of the Board of the Group. Among the projects implemented are, in 2006, consolidation and further sale to Renova one of the largest electrode plants in Russia. In early 2004, the ALLTECH Group acquired more than 20% of the shares in West Siberian Resources Ltd (WSR). The company significantly increased production (in 4 years the company's market capitalization increased almost 20 times) and in 2008 West Siberian Resources merged with Alliance Oil Company.

His coal business began with the acquisition of shares in Siberian Anthracite JSC (the world's largest producer of anthracite UHG, located in Novosibirsk Region). He was the chairman of the board of directors of VostokCoal MC.

In 2008, Bosov became the Head of the supervisory board of the Sibir Ice Hockey Club.

In 2015, he established the Blackspace group of companies in Indonesia, obtaining licenses for coal, nickel, manganese and bauxite mining sites. Since then, Blackspace has implemented two large projects - the development of a coal deposit in Central Kalimantan and the construction of a ferronickel plant on the island of Kabena.

Some media outlets mentioned Bosov's connection with Boris Berezovsky, with whom Bosov stated that "...the only business I participated in with Berezovsky was the Internet company CityLine. He was the first to invest in it. The company was run by my friends Emelyan Zakharov, Demian Kudryavtsev and others. In 1999, they made me an offer to become a co-investor. In 2001 we sold the company and earned a decent amount of money".

== Business ==
=== ALLTECH Group ===
In 1993, Dmitry Bosov and his university classmates Dmitry Aga, Dmitry Shatokhin and Vladimir Mikulik, established ALLTECH Group, a private direct investment company. Another interest of ALLTECH is real estate, which included the development of the ARTPLAY Design Center and several real estate projects in the Moscow region.

In 2007, ALLTECH launched the Pechora LNG project (a comprehensive project to develop the Kumzhinskoye and Korovinskoye fields in the Nenets Autonomous District). In 2015, Rosneft Oil Company entered the project, taking a 50% share in the joint venture. In 2018, Rosneft withdrew from the joint project with ALLTECH.

In 2018, ALLTECH Group merged its coal assets with Sibanthracite Group.

After Bosov's death, a struggle for his share in Alltek unfolded. Ekaterina (Bosov's widow) claimed 77% of the company and sued the rest of the heirs, but in the end she was left without a share. In April 2021, Bosov's share was divided into eight equal parts of 10.82% between the parents, four sons from two previous marriages, Katerina Bosov and her daughter (Bosov's daughter). However, at the beginning of the summer, the share of Katerina Bosov and her daughter in 21.6% was recorded on Alltek.

=== Sibanthracite Group ===
Sibanthracite Group is the world's largest producer of anthracite UHG and is a leading Russian producer of metallurgical coal. The group was established in 2018, uniting the largest coal companies of the Novosibirsk region - Siberian Anthracite JSC and LLC Open-Pit Mine Vostochny LLC, as well as a large coal enterprise in the Kemerovo region - Open-Pit Mine Kiyzassky LLC.

In April 2019, the Sibanthracite Group announced the financial and production results of its activities for RSBC for 2018: production - 24.1 million tons (four times more than in 2014). Revenue - 132.8 billion rubles (an increase of 1.9 times year on year). The total amount of taxes assessed is 12.5 billion rubles, the profit on tax amounted to 8.4 billion rubles. Spending on social and charitable programs - 1.9 billion rubles. By 2022, Sibanthracite plans to produce 58 million tons of coal and anthracite.

One of the most promising projects of the Group is their participation in the construction of the Severomuisk tunnel. Dmitry Bosov announced his readiness to participate in this project in a letter to the President of the Russian Federation, Vladimir Putin, on March 11, 2018.

In 2018, RBC newspaper wrote that the owner of Neftegazholding, Eduard Hudaynatov, was interested in buying Sibanthracite. Sibanthracite denied plans to sell.

After the incorporation of open-pit mine Kiyzassky into the Sibanthracite Group, the former CEO of the mine, Nikolay Zarubin, was dismissed. According to sources, the main reason for the dismissal was a violation of environmental legislation. The company faced criticism for the negative impact on the environment that the open-pit mine had. In an interview with RBC, the head of Sibanthracite Barsky clarified that there are no threats to the company's work.

In April 2019, Sibanthracite announced that the construction time of the Severomuisky tunnel on the Baikal-Amur Magistrale would be 5 years.

In February 2021, it became known that Sibanthracite was bought by the company of the Russian-Armenian investor Albert Avdolyan - presumably for $1 billion.

=== VostokCoal MC ===
VostokCoal MC on a parity basis belongs to Dmitry Bosov and Alexander Isaev (chairman of the board). VostokCoal specializes in creating new coal and infrastructure projects. The company, in partnership with state corporation Rostec, built the Port Vera coal terminal in Primorsky Krai and is preparing to start production at the Ogodginskoe coal field, the largest in the Russian Far East.

The Arctic Mining Company (AGK), part of the VostokCoal MC structure, began developing coal deposits on the Taimyr Peninsula around 2018.

Earlier, representatives of VostokCoal MC stated that by 2023 production at Taimyr would reach 30 million tons. However, as reported by the media, these plans were revised downwards due to the lack of a proven resource base.

In 2019, Bosov was the subject of a negative media campaign, spurred by the arrest of his business partner, Mikhail Abyzov. The campaign was conducted mainly by users of the Telegram-channel Nezygar. As the Telegram Nezygar reported on April 17, 2019, the UFSB for the Krasnoyarsk region opened a criminal case against the Arctic Mining Company (AGK) on April 8, 2019. According to Nezygar, company managers are suspected of illegal coal deals in the absence of a coal mining license. One of the grounds for initiating the case was the results of the inspection of the AGK by Rosprirodnadzor (Federal Service for Supervision of Natural Resource Usage) in 2017. In the same year, Rosprirodnadzor fined AGK 954 million Rubles, stating that it was conducting illegal coal mining. The Arctic Mining Company challenged the audit results in court.

=== Genius Fund ===
In 2018, Bosov financed the creation of the Genius Fund, a vertically integrated cannabis company based in California. The company sought to own its supply of marijuana, which would then be distributed through its line of luxury-branded dispensaries, seeking to disconnect from stoner culture. Bosov was the company's sole investor and used over $160 million of his own money. The Genius Fund was led by two tech entrepreneurs, Ari Stiegler and Gabriel Borden. Bosov was initially introduced to Stiegler and Borden by Danny Abyzov, the son of Bosov's former business partner, Mikhail Abyzov.

In December 2019, Gary “Igor” Shinder was brought on as an advisor. Shinder would lay off the company's entire staff in March 2020, citing complications from the COVID-19 pandemic. The company would close its Melrose Avenue-based flagship store and cease operations soon after.

In April 2020, weeks before Bosov's death, a multi-million dollar lawsuit was filed, where former chief executive officer Francis J. Racioppi alleged "corporate mismanagement, subterfuge, and fraud." A confidential settlement was reached in April 2021 and Racioppi dropped the lawsuit.

== Personal life ==
Bosov was married to Katerina Bosova and had five children. He enjoyed playing ice hockey and was a main sponsor of Vladimir Putin’s Night Hockey League.

=== Death ===
Bosov was found dead in Usovo, Moscow Oblast, on May 6, 2020, as a result of a gunshot wound to the head. The action was speculated to have been a suicide, however, two of Bosov's sons alleged that foul play had likely occurred.
