= Urgal (disambiguation) =

The Urgals are a fictional race in Christopher Paolini's Inheritance Cycle. Urgal may also refer to:

- Novy Urgal, an urban-type settlement in Khabarovsk Krai, Russia
- Sredny Urgal, a former urban-type settlement in Khabarovsk Krai, Russia; since 1997—a rural locality (selo)
- Ust-Urgal, a rural locality (a selo) in Khabarovsk Krai, Russia
