= Kuznetsovsky Tunnel =

Railway tunnel in Russia

Coordinates: 50°11′2″N 139°0′44″E

- Location within Khabarovsk Krai

Overview
- Line: Baikal–Amur Mainline
- Status: Active
- Crosses: Sikhote-Alin

Operation
- Opened: June 1945 (old tunnel); December 2012 (new tunnel)

Technical
- Line length: 413 m (1,355 ft) (old tunnel); 3,890 m (12,760 ft) (new tunnel)
- Track gauge: 1,520 mm (4 ft 11 27/32 in) Russian gauge

Kuznetsovsky Tunnel (Russian: Кузнецовский туннель) is a railroad tunnel on the Baikal Amur Mainline (BAM), on the Sikhote-Alin mountain range in Khabarovsk Krai, Russia. The tunnel, as well as the Kuznetsovsky Pass it provides access to, and a nearby railway station, are all named after Arseny Kuznetsov, a construction engineer who found the suitable location for the railroad, but died during the construction of the tunnel.

That old tunnel was built during World War II and completed by 1945. It is 413 metres (1,355 ft) long. Currently another tunnel is constructed nearby; with a length of 3,890 metres (12,762 ft) this new Kuznetsovsky Tunnel will be one of the longest in Russia.

The construction of the new tunnel will lead to a significant increase in freight traffic on the Eastern Baikal Amur Mainline, which connects Komsomolsk-on-Amur with the sea ports of Vanino and Sovetskaya Gavan. There is expected a growth from 12 million tons in 2009 to 24 million by 2015. The total cost of the project is estimated to be 59.8 billion rubles. The new tunnel was inaugurated in December 2012.

== See also ==
- Severomuysky Tunnel
