= Bira (river) =

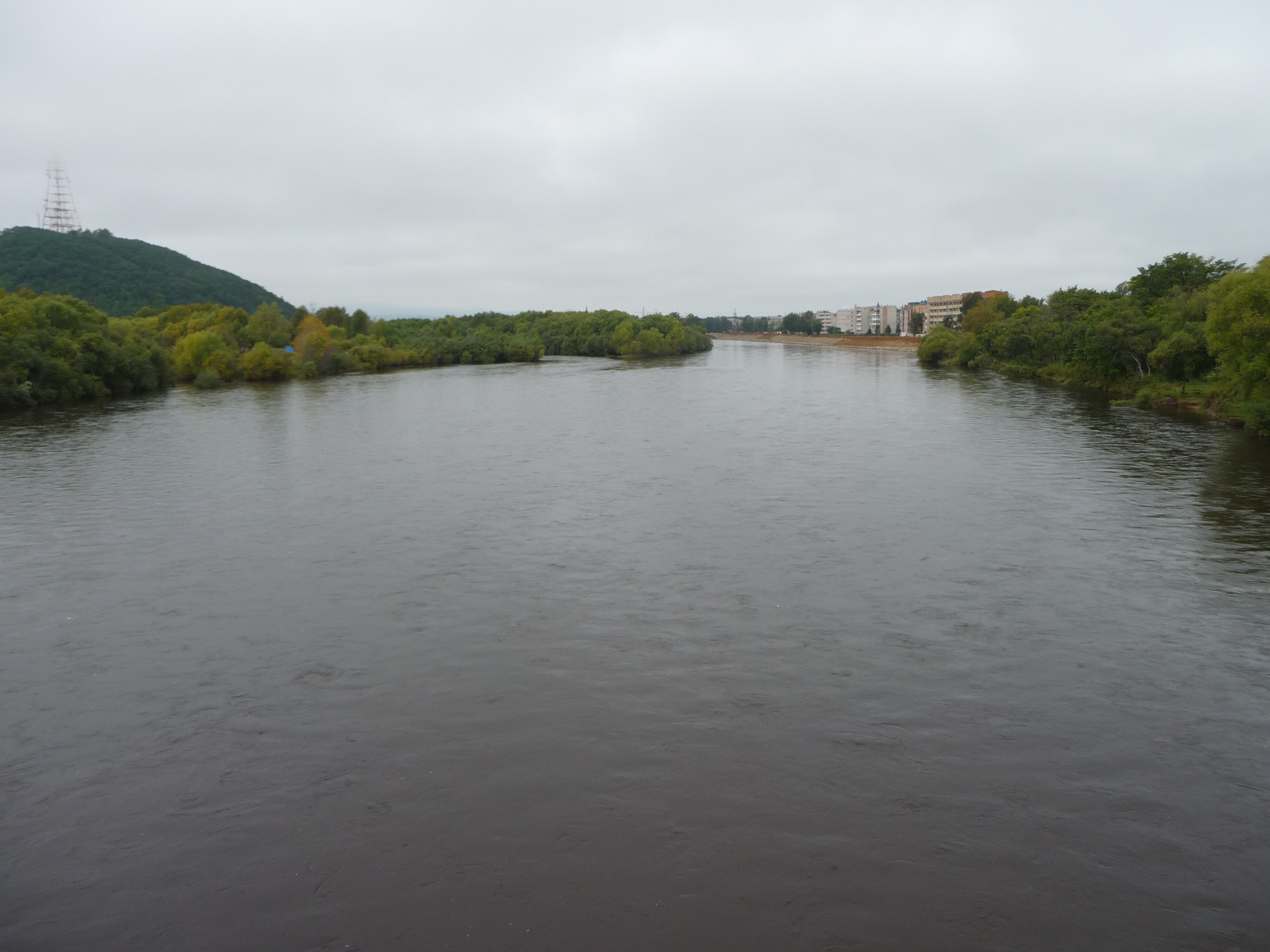
- The Bira in Birobidzhan

Location
- Country: Russia

Physical characteristics
- Source: confluence of Sutara and Kuldur
  - coordinates: 48°58′48″N 131°41′02″E
- Mouth: Amur
  - coordinates: 48.1495°N 133.2925°E
- Length: 86 km (53 mi)
- Basin size: 9,580 km^{2} (3,700 sq mi)

Basin features
- Progression: Amur→ Sea of Okhotsk

The Bira (Russian: Бира) is a river in the Jewish Autonomous Oblast, Russia. The name derives from the Jurchen and Manchu word bira meaning "river". It is 261 kilometres (162 mi) long, and has a drainage basin of 9,580 square kilometres (3,700 sq mi). It is one of the largest, left tributaries of the Amur.

Some of the cities that lie along the river are Birakan, Teploozyorsk, Londoko, Bira, Birobidzhan and Nadezhdinskoye.

== See also ==
- List of rivers of Russia
