= Dusse-Alin Tunnel =

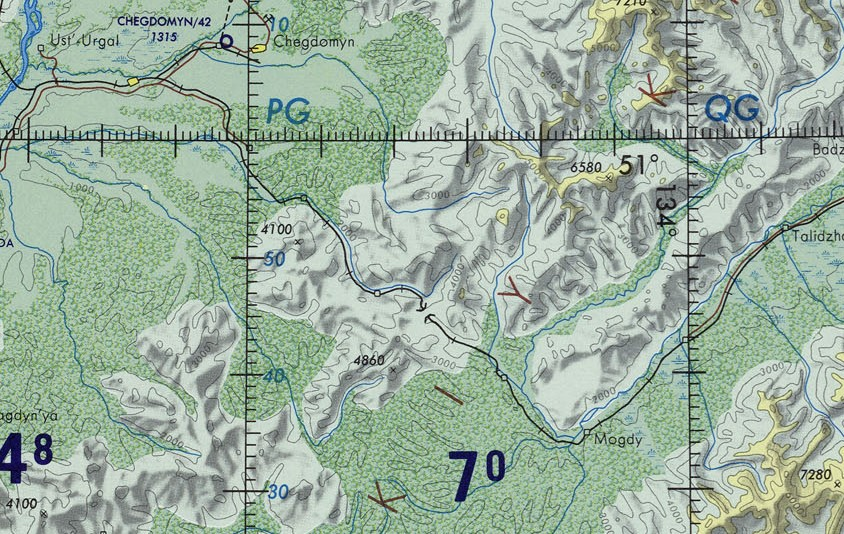
- ONC map section centered on the Dusse-Alin Tunnel

Overview
- Location: Khabarovsk Krai, Russia
- Coordinates: 50.7567°N 133.401°E
- Status: open
- Route: BAM

Operation
- Opened: 11/04/1982

Technical
- Length: 1,852 m (6,076 ft)
- No. of lanes: 1

The Dusse-Alin Tunnel (Russian: Дуссе-Алиньский тоннель) is a two-kilometre-long railway tunnel on the Baikal–Amur Mainline (BAM) in Siberia, 88 kilometres east of Novy Urgal. Although it is named after the Dusse-Alin located about 150 kilometres (93 mi) further northeast, the line crosses the Bureya Range to enter the Amgun River valley just north of the Badzhal Range.

== Construction ==
Work started in 1939. Gulag prisoners arrived on foot, provided only with hand tools, one horse and a single motorized cart. In 1940 the guard commander shot the chief engineer in the back, an act that was ruled an accident (the engineer, Konserov, had previously received an Order of Lenin for his work on the White Sea–Baltic Canal). Work stopped in 1942 and resumed in 1947. The tunnel was officially opened in 1950, but was never used because the rest of the BAM was incomplete. Work on the BAM stopped after Stalin's death in 1953. Water leaked into the abandoned tunnel and it eventually became filled with ice.

Work was resumed in 1974 using railway troops, a group comparable to the US Army Corps of Engineers. They moved into the former gulag barracks, recognized as such by the barbed wire and watch towers left. When work started more reminders were found, including frozen corpses and a candlestick holder made from a skull. Letters home caused a scandal and a commission was sent out from Moscow. The commission concluded that the political education of the soldiers was poor and that it was inappropriate to house them in former prisoners' barracks. In just ten days, the entire camp was leveled, including the cemetery, and all signs of the previous workers were destroyed.

The troops used the blasts from jet engines to melt the 32,000 cubic meters of ice. The tunnel was cleared by 1974, but was not officially opened until November 1982 when the first train traveled from Novy Urgal to Komsomolsk-on-Amur.

== See also ==
- Severomuysky Tunnel, the longest tunnel on the BAM
