= Bureyanus =

Scientific classification
- Kingdom: Animalia
- Phylum: Arthropoda
- Subphylum: Chelicerata
- Class: Arachnida
- Order: Araneae
- Infraorder: Araneomorphae
- Family: Linyphiidae
- Genus: Bureyanus; Tanasevitch, 2023
- Species: B. hastatus

Binomial name
- Bureyanus hastatus Tanasevitch, 2023

Species of spider

Bureyanus is a monotypic genus of spiders in the family Linyphiidae containing the single species, Bureyanus hastatus. It is only known from the Khabarovsk Province of Russia.

The species is only known from one male specimen. Its body length is 1.7 mm. It was found in moss and leaf litter of coniferous forest.

== Etymology ==
The genus name refers to the Bureya River basin, where the species was found. The species name is derived from Latin "hasta" ("spear"), referring to spear-shaped processes on the convector in the male palp.
