= Mount Studencheskaya =

Mountain in Jewish Autonomous Oblast, Russia

- Гора Студенческая
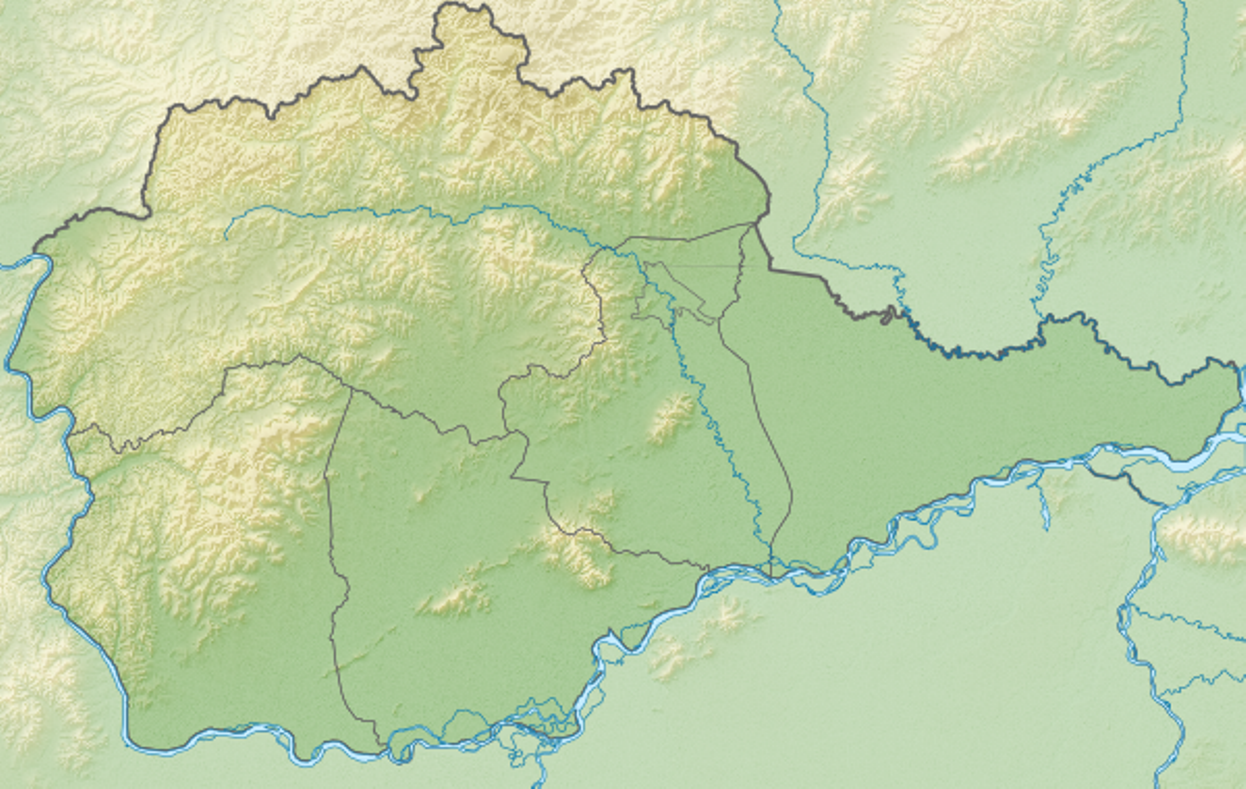
- Location within Jewish Autonomous Oblast

Highest point
- Elevation: 1,421 m (4,662 ft)
- Prominence: 852 m (2,795 ft)
- Coordinates: 49°15′16″N 132°18′28″E

Geography
- Location: Obluchensky District; Jewish Autonomous Oblast, Russian Far East
- Parent range: Bureya Range

Climbing
- Easiest route: From Teploozyorsk or Londoko

Mount Studencheskaya (Russian: Гора Студенческая) is a peak in the Jewish Autonomous Oblast, Russia. It is the highest point of the oblast.

== Description ==
Mount Studencheskaya is a 1,421 metres (4,662 ft) high mountain located near the southern end of the Bureya Range, close to the Khabarovsk Krai border. It rises in the Obluchensky District, on the northern part of the Jewish Autonomous Oblast, north of the valley of the Sutara, one of the rivers forming the Bira, a tributary of the Amur.

== See also ==
- List of highest points of Russian federal subjects
- List of mountains and hills of Russia
