= Vikhorevka =

Vikhorevka Вихоревка
- Town
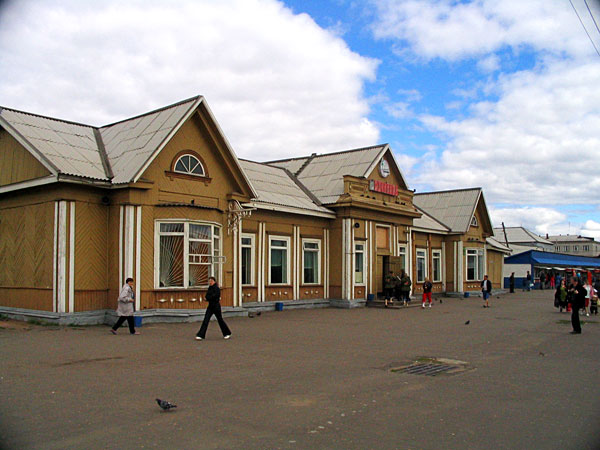
- Old railway station building in Vikhorevka

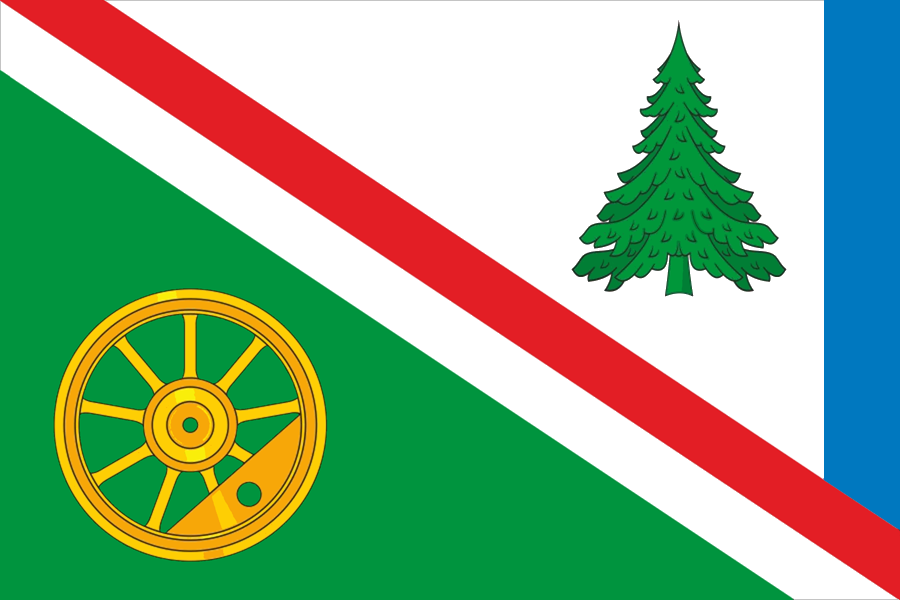
- Flag
- Interactive map of Vikhorevka
- Location of Vikhorevka Vikhorevka (Irkutsk Oblast)
- Coordinates: 56°07′N 101°10′E
- Country: Russia
- Federal subject: Irkutsk Oblast
- Administrative district: Bratsky District
- Founded: 1957
- Town status since: 1966
- Elevation: 365 m (1,198 ft)

Population (2010 Census)
  - Total: 22,520
  - Estimate (2021): 21,719 (−3.6%)

Municipal status
  - Municipal district: Bratsky Municipal District
  - Urban settlement: Vikhorevskoye Urban Settlement
  - Capital of: Vikhorevskoye Urban Settlement
- Time zone: UTC+8 (MSK+5)
- Postal code: 665770–665772
- Dialing code: +7 3953
- OKTMO ID: 25604103001
- Website: www.adm-vih.ru

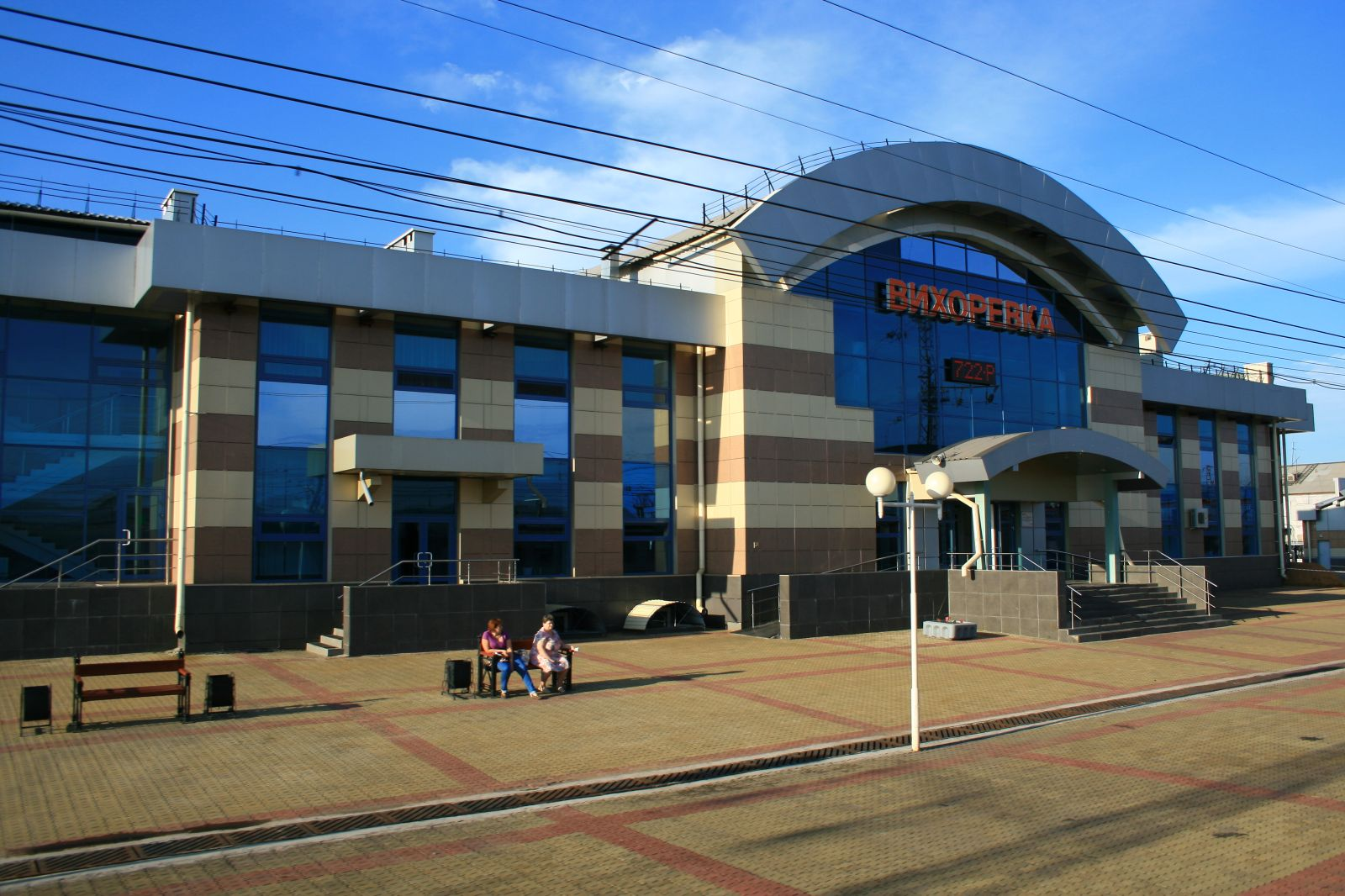

Vikhorevka (Russian: Вихоревка, IPA: [ˈvʲixərʲɪfkə]) is a town in Bratsky District of Irkutsk Oblast, Russia, located on the left bank of the Vikhorevka River (Angara River's tributary), 916 kilometers (569 mi) northwest of Irkutsk, the administrative center of the oblast, and 46 kilometers (29 mi) southwest of Bratsk. Population: 22,520 (2010 census); 24,763 (2002 census); 23,872 (1989 Soviet census).

== History ==
It was founded in 1957 as a workers' settlement due to the construction of the western section of the Baikal–Amur Mainline between Tayshet and Bratsk. The river, the railway station, and the town were named after Vikhor Savin, a Strelets sotnik who was killed here by the Tungus people in 1630. It was granted town status in 1966.

== Administrative and municipal status ==
Within the framework of administrative divisions, Vikhorevka is subordinated to Bratsky District. As a municipal division, the town of Vikhorevka is incorporated within Bratsky Municipal District as Vikhorevskoye Urban Settlement.

== Economy ==
The town's economy relies mainly on timber production, as well as a railway depot.
