= Teploozyorsk =

Teploozyorsk Теплоозёрск
- Urban locality
- Interactive map of Teploozyorsk
- Location of Teploozyorsk Teploozyorsk (Jewish Autonomous Oblast)
- Coordinates: 49°0′N 131°54′E
- Country: Russia
- Federal subject: Jewish Autonomous Oblast
- Administrative district: Obluchensky District

Population (2010 Census)
  - Total: 4,311
  - Estimate (2010): 3,369 (−21.9%)
- Time zone: UTC+10 (MSK+7)
- Postal code: 679110
- OKTMO ID: 99620170051

Teploozyorsk is an urban locality (an urban-type settlement) in Obluchensky District of the Jewish Autonomous Oblast, Russia. Population: 4,311 (2010 census); 5,124 (2002 census); 5,775 (1989 Soviet census).

== Geography ==
The settlement is located west of Londoko, at the southern end of the Bureya Range, near Mount Studencheskaya.
