= Port Vera =

Coordinates: 42°57′27″N 132°17′37″E

Port Vera, or Vera Port Coal Terminal as it is colloquially known, is a coal terminal in Russia's Far East. It is located across the bay from Vladivostok. It cost more than $1 billion in Rubles to build. The terminal is to have a capacity of to 20 million tonnes per year.

== History ==
Port Vera project began in 2014. It was subsidized by Rostec and designed by Rosengineering.

In August 2022, the port was completed with a draft of 12.11 meters. The berth is 246 meters long.

In 2023, the port was sold to the Sibanthracite Group.

In February 2025, North American Company, Inc. made a purchase offer for Port Vera and its assets of $5 billion in Rubles. No other information is known about this offer.
