= Londoko =

Londoko Лондоко-завод
- Urban locality
- Interactive map of Londoko
- Location of Londoko Londoko (Jewish Autonomous Oblast)
- Coordinates: 49°01′12″N 131°59′13″E
- Country: Russia
- Federal subject: Jewish Autonomous Oblast
- Administrative district: Obluchensky District
- Founded: 1938

Population (2010 Census)
  - Total: 1,037
  - Estimate (2010): 981 (−5.4%)
- Time zone: UTC+10 (MSK+7)
- Postal code: 679116
- OKTMO ID: 99620170056

Londoko is an urban locality (an urban-type settlement) in Obluchensky District of the Jewish Autonomous Oblast, Russia. Its population was 1,037 (2010 census); 1,340 (2002 census); 1,902 (1989 Soviet census).

== Geography ==
The village is located east of Teploozyorsk, at the southern end of the Bureya Range, near Mount Studencheskaya.
