= Chegdomyn =

Urban locality in Khabarovsk Krai, Russia

Coordinates: 51°07′N 133°01′E

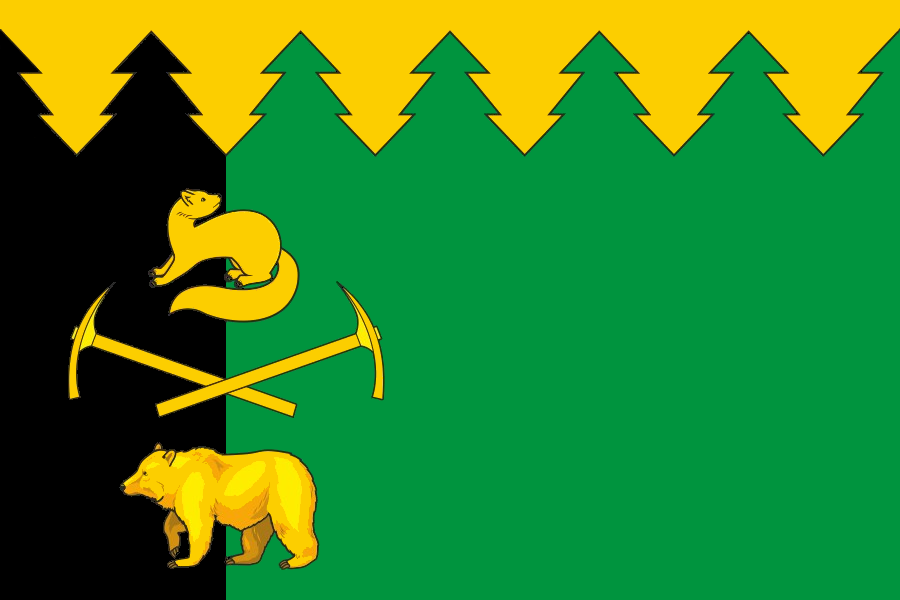
Flag of Chegdomyn

Chegdomyn (Russian: Чегдомын) is an urban locality (a work settlement) and the administrative center of Verkhnebureinsky District of Khabarovsk Krai, Russia. Population: 13,048 (2010 census); 15,303 (2002 census); 20,347 (1989 Soviet census).

== History ==
Chegdomyn was founded in 1939, with the beginning of black coal mining in the area. At the same time, construction of a branch line from the Trans-Siberian Railway at Isvestkovaya to Chegdomyn was begun, although it was dismantled during World War II and its tracks reused in construction projects closer to the front.

After the end of the war, the railway was rebuilt, opening in 1951. Coal mining resumed in 1948, and Chegdomyn was granted urban-type settlement status in 1949.

== Geography ==
The settlement is situated in the Bureya River basin, just north of the Baikal-Amur Mainline (BAM). A branch line connects Chegdomyn to Novy Urgal on the BAM. It is located in the valley of the Chegdomyn River, near its confluence with the Urgal. Chegdomyn is located about 340 kilometers (210 mi) northwest of the krai's administrative center of Khabarovsk.

== Climate ==
Chegdomyn has a monsoon-influenced humid continental/subarctic climate (Köppen Dwb/Dwc) with severely cold, dry winters and rather warm, rainy summers. Temperatures in the area of the city typically change by over 50 °C (90.0 °F) over the course of the year, with a daily average of −29.5 °C (−21.1 °F) in January, compared to +19.9 °C (67.8 °F) in July.

Chegdomyn is as cold a climate gets in the world while still meeting the requirements for not being subarctic. This is due to the location being far enough inland to experience severe cold from the Siberian High in winter and to build up warmth in late spring, while at the same time being near the coast to extend summers. The autumn fall of temperatures is sizeable, with August to December having a mean monthly drop of 11 °C (20 °F). In spring, the gain is almost as rapid. With peak winter being quite dry, the most snow accumulation usually later in the season due to the weakening of the high-pressure systems in favour of more humid air masses. In summer, temperatures are often moderated by the frequent rainfall, but are still warm for the latitude at about 26 °C (79 °F) average highs.

Climate data for Chegdomyn
Month	Jan	Feb	Mar	Apr	May	Jun	Jul	Aug	Sep	Oct	Nov	Dec	Year
Record high °C (°F)	−4.0 (24.8)	0.0 (32.0)	15.7 (60.3)	23.9 (75.0)	32.0 (89.6)	33.8 (92.8)	38.0 (100.4)	32.4 (90.3)	28.0 (82.4)	21.1 (70.0)	7.0 (44.6)	0.0 (32.0)	38.0 (100.4)
Mean daily maximum °C (°F)	−24.5 (−12.1)	−15.5 (4.1)	−4.0 (24.8)	7.2 (45.0)	16.4 (61.5)	23.7 (74.7)	26.0 (78.8)	22.9 (73.2)	16.1 (61.0)	5.8 (42.4)	−10.7 (12.7)	−22.8 (−9.0)	3.4 (38.1)
Daily mean °C (°F)	−29.5 (−21.1)	−22.1 (−7.8)	−10.8 (12.6)	1.8 (35.2)	10.0 (50.0)	16.9 (62.4)	19.9 (67.8)	17.1 (62.8)	10.1 (50.2)	0.1 (32.2)	−15.9 (3.4)	−27.3 (−17.1)	−2.5 (27.6)
Mean daily minimum °C (°F)	−34.4 (−29.9)	−28.7 (−19.7)	−17.6 (0.3)	−3.7 (25.3)	3.6 (38.5)	10.0 (50.0)	13.7 (56.7)	11.2 (52.2)	4.0 (39.2)	−5.6 (21.9)	−21.0 (−5.8)	−31.8 (−25.2)	−8.4 (17.0)
Record low °C (°F)	−47.8 (−54.0)	−46.0 (−50.8)	−33.9 (−29.0)	−20.0 (−4.0)	−19.0 (−2.2)	−8.0 (17.6)	2.8 (37.0)	1.0 (33.8)	−7.8 (18.0)	−22.0 (−7.6)	−39.0 (−38.2)	−45.0 (−49.0)	−47.8 (−54.0)
Average precipitation mm (inches)	10.6 (0.42)	29.5 (1.16)	68.2 (2.69)	90.2 (3.55)	112.5 (4.43)	120.9 (4.76)	131.7 (5.19)	119.0 (4.69)	111.2 (4.38)	58.6 (2.31)	24.9 (0.98)	9.9 (0.39)	887.2 (34.95)
Average precipitation days	5.8	4.3	5.9	5.9	6.1	7.7	7.3	7.7	7.3	4.0	4.6	5.0	71.6
Source: climatebase.ru

== Economy ==
The settlement's main industry remains coal mining by Urgalugol, now owned by the Siberian Coal Energy Company. There is also some timber production in the surrounding area.

=== Transportation ===
Chegdomyn is the terminus of a 356-kilometer (221 mi) long branch railway from the station Isvestkovaya on the Trans-Siberian Railway.

== Notable people ==
- Maksim Gerasin (born 1974), Russian professional football coach and former player
