= Albert Avdolyan =

Russian investor, businessman and philanthropist

- Born: November 8, 1970 (age 56); Krasnodar, RSFSR, USSR
- Known for: investor, businessman and philanthropist
- Children: 4

Albert Alikovich Avdolyan (born November 8, 1970) is a Russian investor, businessman and philanthropist. Founder of Yota company, which became the first LTE operator in Russia. Core assets: A-Property Company, ELSI, “New Home” Fund, Yakut Fuel and Energy Company.

== Business and investments ==
=== Establishment of Yota ===
In 2007 Albert Avdolyan, together with Sergey Adoniev, co-owner of Telconet Capital Fund, established Scartel Telecommunications Company. In 2008 the company was the first in Russia to launch wireless Internet access using WiMAX technology under Yota brand. The network was deployed in Moscow and St. Petersburg. In 2009 Yota became available in Ufa, Krasnodar, Sochi, Nicaragua and Belarus. In 2011 the company became the first LTE operator in Russia.

In 2012 Megafon and Skartel formed Garsdale Services Holding. In 2013 Albert Avdolyan and Sergey Adoniev withdrew from the capital of Garsdale by selling their own shares to the Holding (Telconet Capital Fund owned 13.5% of Garsdale shares)^{.}

=== Hydrometallurgical Plant ===
In the fall of 2018 Albert Avdolyan entered the capital of a group of enterprises for the production of mineral fertilizers and ligatures (including the Hydrometallurgical Plant, Southern Energy Company and Intermix Met), which is located in the city of Lermontov, Stavropol Territory. In 2017 the Hydrometallurgical Plant suspended its work due to the debts of the previous owners. In 2018 a new investor restructured the debts of the enterprise and repaid wage arrears to the plant's staff.

The plant was restarted on November 14, 2018. The enterprise carried out modernization^{]} and increased annual revenue. Subsequently, the group of enterprises was named Almaz Group. The hydrometallurgical plant was named Almaz Fertilizers, Southern Energy Company was renamed Almaz Energo, and Intermix Met became Almaz Tech. In 2022 Albret Avdolyan left the fertilizer business, selling it to Almaz Group management.

According to the businessman, over the three years since the restructuring of unique enterprises has been completed, nothing threatens them. This was the reason to sell the asset.

=== Yakut Fuel and Energy Company ===
In 2019 Albert Avdolyan's A-Property entity became the owner of Yakut Fuel and Energy Company (YATEC), which was controlled by Ziyavudin Magomedov. In 2018 Yakut Fuel and Energy Company began to experience financial difficulties. The company's total debt as of October 2018 amounted to RUB 14 billion with EBITDA of RUB 3 billion^{.} On January 16, 2019, the Arbitration Court of Yakutia introduced a monitoring procedure for the company for a period of four months, until mid-May.

In September 2019 the Board of Directors of YATEC approved an agreement on the assignment of the company in favour of A-Property^{[11].} Today, the company is safe from bankruptcy, and A-Property is the majority shareholder, which owns 20.16% of the ordinary shares of YATEC, PJSC.

The new management of YATEC announced plans to invest more than RUB 4.7 billion in industrial safety, ecology, maintenance and repair work and renovation of gas production infrastructure^{.} Today, the company's shares are traded on the Moscow Exchange, and the company's capitalization exceeds RUB 100 billion.

=== Elga Coal Deposit ===
In early 2020 Albert Avdolyan, representing his A-Property Company, acquired 51% of shares in Elgaugol, LLC, Elga-Doroga, LLC and Mechel-Trans-Vostok LLC, from Mechel, PJSC. These companies are the operators of the Elga coal deposit, one of the largest coking coal deposits in Russia, which is located in the southeastern part of Yakutia.

As soon as the debt remaining from the previous owner to the VEB RF was repaid, the team of Albert Avdolyan began to implement an investment program that provides for an increase in coal mining by nine times, and processing by ten times, as well as expanding the carrying capacity of the Elga-Ulak railway. In December 2020 A-Property exercised an option to purchase 49% of the Elga project from Gazprombank and became the owner of 100% of the assets of the Elga coal complex.

=== ELSI Coal Company ===
In July 2022 A-Property Development of Albert Avdolyan completed the consolidation of the shares of Sibanthracite group. In August 2022 A-Property announced the merger of coal asset management into a single company Elga-Sibanthracite Management Company, LLC (ELSI). This new company Elga-Sibanthracite Management Company, LLC entered the top three Russian coal mining companies in terms of coal mining and transportation.

ELSI's assets are located in the Republic of Sakha (Yakutia), the Khabarovsk Krai and Primorsk Krai, Novosibirsk, Kemerovo and Amur Oblasts.

The Elga Coal Complex in the Republic of Sakha (Yakutia) is a group of companies that extract, process, transport and sell coking coal.

The company assets in Novosibirsk and Kemerovo Oblasts include Razrez Kolyvansky, JSC, Razrez Vostochny, LLC, Razrez Kiyzassky, LLC and Razrez Verkhneteshsky, LLC.

In Amur Oblast there is the largest deposit of the Far East - the Ogodzhinskoye deposit. Port Vera is located in the Primorsk Krai.

The projects owned by the company in the Khabarovsk Krai include Port Vera and the Pacific Railway.

=== Pacific Railway ===
The Pacific Railway (PR) is an infrastructure megaproject of ELSI coal company. The railway line will pass through the territory of the Republic of Sakha (Yakutia) and the Khabarovsk Territory. It will connect the Elga coal deposit with the Port Elga offshore coal terminal near Cape Manorsky on the coast of the Sea of Okhotsk.

The length of the PR will be 531 km. Within the framework of the project, 1 intermediate depot and 18 rail junctions will be built. Taking into account the rail junctions and depots, the “track miles” of the railway track will be 626 km. This is a record value for private railways in the Russian Federation.

The railway facilities are expected to be put into operation in 2026.

The company currently supplies coal to customers via its own Elga-Ulak railway line, which links the deposit with the Baikal-Amur Mainline. As a result of its modernization in 2022, the length of this railway artery has grown to 386 km, and the throughput capacity has increased fivefold. After the construction of the PR and the completion of other ELSI infrastructure facilities in the Khabarovsk Krai, the total length of the railway owned by the company will be about 1,200 km.

The daily traffic on the PR will be 18 pairs of freight trains, the freight traffic will be provided by a rolling stock of 15 locomotives and 1.2 thousand wagons.

Investments in the creation of the Pacific Railway are estimated at RUB 146.6 billion. The project is implemented at the investor’ own cost and expense.

The PR facilities are constructed in difficult climatic conditions and at a great distance from settlements. The implementation of such project is comparable to the start of construction of such facilities as the BAM or the Trans-Siberian Railway.

== Wealth ==
In 2024 he ranked 1143rd among the world's billionaires.

Year	2021	2023	2024
Wealth ($ billion)	1	2.2	2.9

== Charity ==
In 2013 Albert Avdolyan founded a Charitable Foundation for Assistance to Disabled Children, Orphans and the Seriously Ill Children “New Home”, with the aim of building an educational complex with a village for foster families “Point of the Future” in Irkutsk.

“Point of the Future” will be the first multifunctional educational complex in Russia for orphans and disabled children. The “Point of the Future” includes a comprehensive secondary school for a thousand students, a centre for social and psychological support, a settlement for families with foster children and a kindergarten. Accommodation in the village and schooling are free. 10 cottages have been built by August 2020.

The project worth RUB 6 billion is a personal initiative of the founder of “New Home” Fund, Albert Avdolyan, which was supported by the head of the fund's board of trustees Sergey Chemezov (head of the state corporation Rostec).

In 2022, the construction of the second educational complex of the “Point of the Future” in the Republic of Sakha (Yakutia) began under the guidance of “New Home” Fund.

The first pile into the foundation of the educational complex was solemnly driven on October 11, 2022.

Other charitable initiatives of Albert Avdolyan include the largest private contribution to the fund to help flood victims in Krymsk, assistance to flood victims in Irkutsk, repayment of loans of 78-year-old local historian Svetlana Pshennikova for the publication of a book about fellow countrymen who died in the Great Patriotic War.

== Personal life ==
Albert Avdolyan is married and has four children.
