= Bureya (river) =

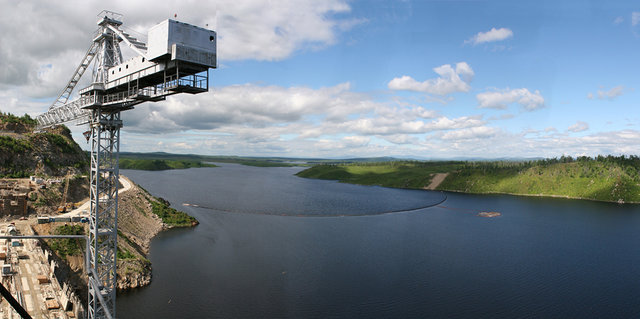

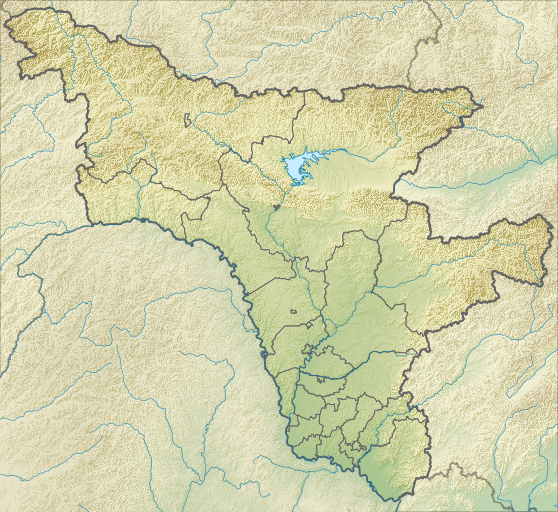
- Mouth location in Amur Oblast, Russia
- Native name: Бурея (Russian)

Location
- Country: Russia

Physical characteristics
- Source: Bureya Range
  - location: Khabarovsk Krai
  - coordinates: 51°39′45″N 134°16′54″E
  - elevation: 580 m (1,900 ft)
- Mouth: Amur
  - coordinates: 49.4077°N 129.5328°E
  - elevation: 95 m (312 ft)
- Length: 623 km (387 mi)
- Basin size: 70,700 km^{2} (27,300 sq mi)
- Discharge
  - location: Mouth
  - average: 940 m^{3}/s (33,000 cu ft/s)
  - maximum: 18,100 m^{3}/s (640,000 cu ft/s)

Basin features
- Progression: Amur→ Sea of Okhotsk

The Bureya (Russian: Бурея) is a south-flowing, left tributary of the Amur river in Russia. It is 623 kilometres (387 mi) long, and has a drainage basin of 70,700 square kilometres (27,300 sq mi). Its name comes from the Evenk word birija, meaning river.

== Course ==
The Bureya is formed from the junction of the Pravaya (right) Bureya and the Levaya (left) Bureya.

== Geography ==
Its basin is bounded in the west by the Turan Range and the river Zeya, to the south by the Amur, to the east by the Bureya Range, the rivers Urmi and Amgun, and to the north by the Ezop Range and several rivers that flow northeastwards into the Sea of Okhotsk.

There are no cities on the river, the largest settlements on the river are Novy Urgal on the Baikal Amur Mainline and, Novobureysky and Bureya, both on the Trans-Siberian Railway. The Tyrma is a left tributary that crosses the railway south from Novy Urgal at the town of Tyrma. The Chegdomyn coal fields are north of Novy Urgal. The Bureya hydro power plant holds back middle stream of the river and mitigates extremal surge events during summer rainy seasons. The counter-regulating Nizhne-Bureiskaya HPP was built in 2017 and is located downstream of the Bureiskaya HPP. M58 highway (Russia) crosses it on a bridge.

== Landslide in December 2018 ==
The river was blocked by a landslide in December 2018 on a width of about 600 to 800 meters and a height of 80 to 160 meters. Initial reports have speculated that the landslide was caused by a meteor impact. Meanwhile, however, an earthquake is considered as the most likely cause for the landslide. The blockade of the river might be removed by explosions or air raids of the Russian army. This, however, involves the risk of a torrent.

== See also ==
- Bureya grayling
- List of rivers of Russia
