= Cape Manorsky =

Cape on the Sea of Okhotsk

Coordinates: 55°07′N 135°42′E

Cape Manorsky (Russian: Mys Manorsky) is a cape in the western Sea of Okhotsk. It lies ten miles (16 km) southwest of Cape Nosorog. A small reef extends to the south of the cape.

== History ==
American whaleships targeting bowhead whales used the bight to the west of Cape Manorsky in the 1850s and 1860s. They called it Florence or Schooner Harbor. Both names are in reference to the barque Florence, of Honolulu, which frequented the area in the 1850s and 1860s and utilized schooners as tenders. Ships that anchored in the bay sent boats out into the ice just offshore or to the head of Uda Bay to look for whales. Boats were also sent ashore to get wood.
