= Bureya Range =

Mountain range in Russia

- Russian: Буреинский хребет
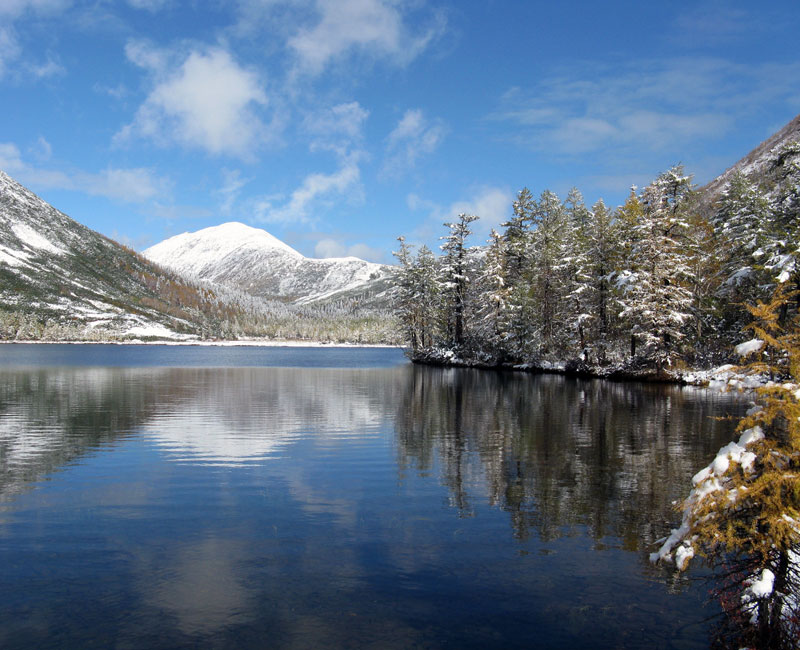
- View of Korbokhon lake at the northern end of the range

Highest point
- Peak: Unnamed
- Elevation: 2,167 m (7,110 ft)

Dimensions
- Length: 400 km (250 mi)

Geography
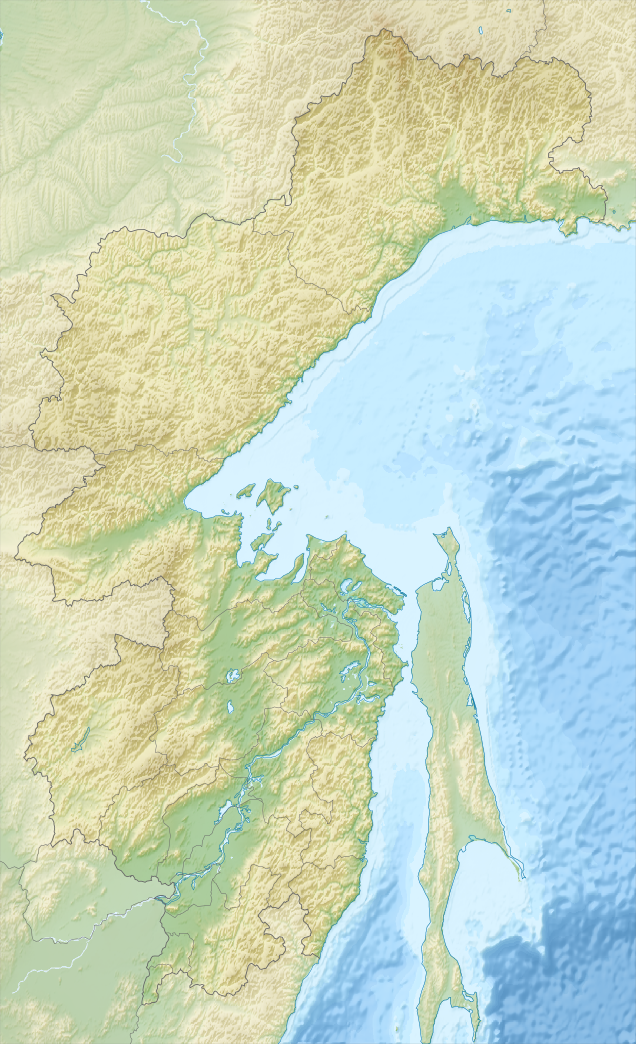
- Location within Khabarovsk Krai
- Country: Russia
- Region(s): Khabarovsk Krai; Jewish Autonomous Oblast
- Range coordinates: 50°0′0″N 133°0′0″E

Geology
- Orogeny: Alpine orogeny
- Rock type(s): Granite, gneiss, sedimentary and effusive rocks

The Bureya Range (Russian: Буреинский хребет, Bureinskiy Khrebet) is a mountain range in the Khabarovsk Krai and Jewish Autonomous Oblast in the southern part of the Russian Far East.

The Dusse-Alin Tunnel on the Baikal Amur Mainline crosses the range to enter the Amgun River valley. The Bastak Nature Reserve, a protected area, is located in the southeastern corner of the range.

== Geography ==
The Bureya Range consists of a number of separate ridges with a total length of about 400 km and with a maximum height of 2,167 metres (7,110 ft). To the northeast it connects with the Badzhal Range. The range forms the drainage divide of the Bureya, Amgun and Urmi rivers. The sources of the Selemdzha River are located at the northern end, where other three ranges meet the Bureya mountain chain, the Dusse-Alin from the south, the Ezop Range from the west and the Yam-Alin from the north. The Dusse-Alin and Yam-Alin are a northern prolongation of the Bureya Range.

Mount Studencheskaya is located in the southern part of the Bureya Range. At 1,421 metres (4,662 ft), it is the highest point of the Jewish Autonomous Oblast.

== Flora ==
The slopes of the range are covered by conifer and deciduous forests.

== See also ==
- List of mountains and hills of Russia
