= Sibanthracite Group =

- Native name: Группа «Сибантрацит» (Sibanthracite Group)
- Industry: Coal industry Infrastructure projects
- Headquarters: Moscow, Russia
- Products: Anthracite, metallurgical coal
- Revenue: Revenue 125.5 billion rubles. (2019)
- Website: sibanthracite.ru

Sibanthracite Group (Russian: «Сибирский Антрацит») is Russia's largest producer of metallurgical coal and world leader in the production and export of high quality UHG anthracite. All coal companies of the Group are managed by Management Company "Sibanthracite", having its offices in Moscow.

== History ==
Sibanthracite Group was established in 2018. The Group includes the leading coal companies of Novosibirsk region: Siberian Anthracite and Open-Pit Mine Vostochny (both anthracite producers).

The Group's strategy is growth through the development of new start-up projects: from obtaining a mining licence to the start of dynamic production.

At the moment Sibathracite is developing the Sugodinsko-Ogodginskoe coal deposit, the largest one in the Far East region (Amur Region), of which the production began in 2020. In addition, The Group owns Sibantracite Kuzbass, which holds a license for the development of the Verkhnetishskoye coalfield in Kuzbass. Production will start in 2020.

== Owners and management ==
The production assets of Sibanthracite Group are owned by Sibanthracite PLC registered in Cyprus, of which its sole shareholder is ALLTECH. More than 86% of ALLTECH shares were controlled by Dmitry Bosov, chairman of the board of directors, who died in the night of May 6, 2020.

All companies of the group are managed by management company “Sibantracite”.

In October 2021, Sibantracite was acquired by Russian businessman Albert Avdolyan from ALLTECH and the heirs of Dmitry Bosov.

In late 2023, Avdolyan sold the group of companies to Bashkir Industrial Holding LLC.

== Activity ==
Sibanthracite Group's facilities are located in the Novosibirsk and the Kemerovo regions. The companies specialize in open-pit coal mining. In 2019, the production volume of Sibanthracite Group amounted to 23.7 million tons, of which UHG anthracite - 14.1 million tons, T grade coal (PCI) - 9.6 million tons. 98% of anthracite and 70% of metallurgical coal are exported, mainly to the Asian-Pacific Region.

In the Novosibirsk region, Sibantracite Group mines anthracite from the deposits of the Gorlovsky coal basin. Siberian Anthracite and Open-Pit Mine Vostochny develop 3 open-cast mines: Kolyvansky, Gorlovsky, and Vostochny. The facilities include two washing plants, three loading terminals, and 40 km of haul roads.

The Group's coal start-ups are known for their fast commissioning of new enterprises.

The development of the Open-Pit Mine Vostochnyy in the Novosibirsk region started in 2015 and the anthracite mining started in 2016. At the end of 2018, the production volume amounted to 6.4 million tons.

Another region of the Group's presence is the Amur Region. In 2020 coal mining started at the Sugodinsko-Ogodzhinskoye coalfield, of which resources are estimated at 1.5 billion tons. The design capacity is 20 million tons of coal per year.

In 2019, Sibanthracite Group started the implementation of the “Severomuisky Tunnel-2” construction project.

In 2019, according to the Forbes magazine, Sibanthracite Group ranked third place in the five most rapidly developing companies in Russia. In the RBC rating of the fastest growing companies, Sibanthracite is ranked 13th place. It is noteworthy that Sibanthracite was the only coal company in the magazine's rating.

== Production ==
=== Performance Indicators ===
- 2016 - 14.1 million tons
- 2017 - 21.3 million tons
- 2018 - 24.1 million tons
- 2019 - 23.7 million tons
- 2020 - 24.0 million tons

=== Financial data ===
Sibantracite Group's consolidated performance indicators according to IFRS for 2019: revenue reached 125.5 billion rubles. The total amount of taxes paid amounted to 7.7 billion rubles, with a tax on profit of 5.1 billion rubles. The volume of investments counted 10.8 billion rubles.

The group companies are among the leading taxpayers in the regions of operation.

According to the results of the first quarter of 2020, Siberian Anthracite and LLC Vostochny open pit were included in the list of the largest taxpayers of the Novosibirsk region.

In 2025, North American Company, Inc. made a purchase offer for Port Vera and its assets of 5 billion rubles. No other information is known about this offer.

== Products ==
Anthracite, mined at the Kolyvanskiy coal deposit in the Novosibirsk region possesses the best physical and chemical characteristics among all anthracites. It is classified as Ultra High Grade Anthracite (UHG). It has the highest carbon content for premium quality anthracites—over 92% and a low level of impurities, such as sulphur, phosphorus, nitrogen, etc. The main field of application is metallurgy.

Application sectors: 80% - metallurgy, 10% - power industry, and 10% -chemical industry.

== Corporate social activities ==
Corporate social responsibility is an important area in the activities of Sibanthracite Group. The companies of The Group, carry out social and charitable programs in the region. Sibantracite supports and helps the development of the hockey movement in Novosibirsk region.

The Group is one of the founders and a permanent partner of the Novosibirsk Siberia hockey club.

Sibanthracite Group implements a comprehensive program to support education in the Novosibirsk Region.

With the support of the Government of the Novosibirsk Region, it is implementing a program for the training of personnel for the mining industry of the region, together with the Ministry of Education and five leading universities in the region.

Siberian Anthracite is a partner of the Regional Educational Center for the Identification and Development of Talented Children Altair - the Siberian branch of the educational center Sirius.

With the support of Sibanthracite in the Novosibirsk region, the federal educational project "Teacher for Russia" is being implemented since 2020.

The Group implements a long-term social project in Kuzbass — the support of the Shors, a small indigenous ethnic group.

Sibantracite Group pays considerable attention to the environmental issues. Group companies implement environmental programme, which includes eco-monitoring in the regions of presence.
