= Severomuysky Tunnel =

Railway tunnel in Buryatia, Russia

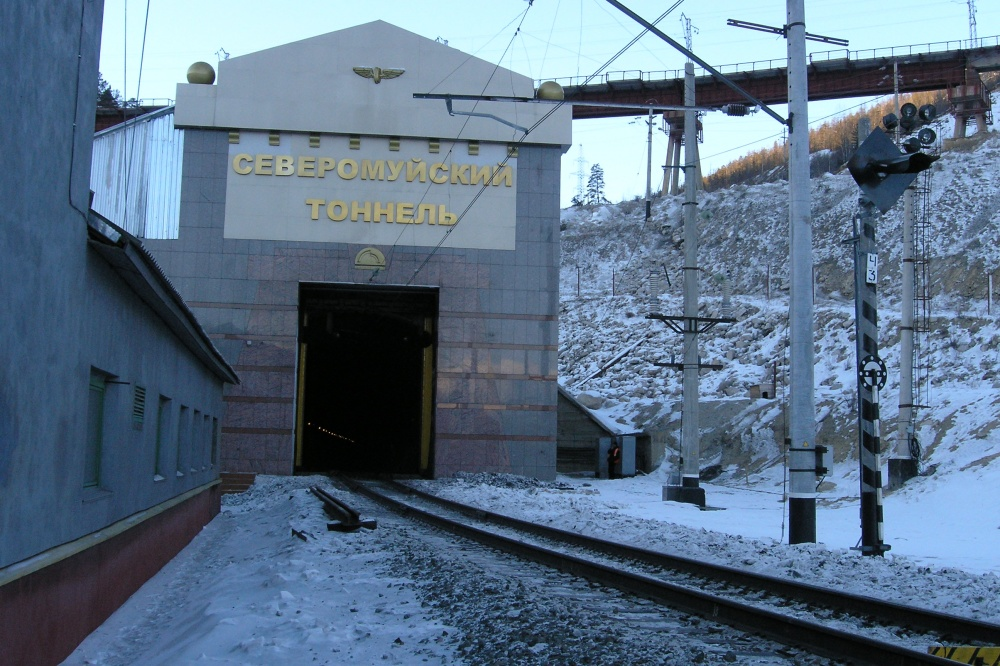
- Severomuysky Tunnel, Eastern Portal

- Location within Republic of Buryatia

Overview
- Location: Buryatia, Russia
- Coordinates: 56°14′26″N 113°26′30″E
- Status: open
- Route: BAM

Operation
- Work began: 28 May 1977
- Opened: 12 May 2003

Technical
- Length: 15,343 m (50,338 ft)
- No. of lanes: 1
- Track gauge: 1,520 mm (4 ft 11 27/32 in) Russian gauge

The Severomuysky Tunnel (Russian: Северому́йский тонне́ль) is a railroad tunnel on the Baikal Amur Mainline (BAM), in northwestern Buryatia, Russia. It is named after the Northern Muya Range it cuts through. The tunnel is 15.34 kilometres (9.53 mi) long, the longest in Russia (excluding metro lines).

== Geography ==
The tunnel cuts under the Severomuysky Range, a mountain ridge separating the Upper Angara basin to the north west from the Muya basin to the south east. The BAM then follows the valley of the Muyakan River on its way east towards its junction with the Muya shortly before Taksimo. A works town named after the tunnel was built at each end during its construction; Tonnelny at the western portal and Severomuysk at the eastern portal. Tonnelny was abandoned in 2004 after the opening of the tunnel and its population relocated to Severomuysk. Employment in Severomuysk relies almost entirely on the maintenance of the tunnel and its bypass route.

== History ==
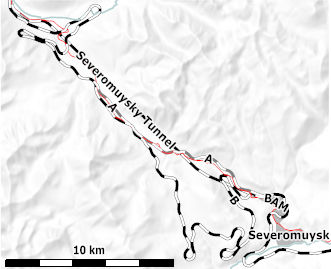
Map of the Severomuysky Tunnel, showing (A) first bypass (1982-83) and (B) second bypass (1989)

Preliminary work on the tunnel started in 1975, with tunneling commencing on 28 May 1977. The tunnel was built through very difficult rock with four major faults and a great deal of underground water, some at 35 standard atmospheres (3.5 MPa) pressure. One method used was to pump liquid nitrogen into the rock, freezing the water until the cut could be sealed. In September 1979 workers broke into a fault connected to a 12,000 cubic metres (3,200,000 US gal) underground lake. This required building a drainage tunnel and delayed work for 18 months.

When it became clear that the tunnel would not be completed in time for the planned official opening of the BAM in 1984, a 28 kilometres (17 mi) bypass was built during the years 1982–83. This had a 4% grade and traffic was limited to 15 kilometres per hour (9 mph). Passenger traffic was prohibited.

In 1989, a new bypass of 54 kilometres (34 mi) was completed (with a 2% ruling grade) and the original bypass route was closed. The two bypasses crossed near the Pereval Station; the new bypass route has lengthy extra loops at both ends of its route to enable its construction with reduced gradient. Once the new bypass was opened, the older one (used mainly for transporting goods required for construction) was dismantled and now almost nothing remains of it. From 1989, the new route was open for passenger trains, although it required auxiliary engines to push trains up steep sections and was limited to a maximum speed of 20 kilometres per hour (12 mph), the 54 kilometres (34 mi) route taking around 2 1/2 hours to cross. This section features a large number of tight curves and viaducts, with the long curved bridge built near the tunnel's western portal being nicknamed locally the Devil's Bridge (Chortov Most 56.27155°N 113.36048°E). It also includes two tunnels of its own, one of which is 2 kilometres (1.2 mi) in length. It is expensive to maintain and is at risk from avalanches.

The main tunnel was put into operation on 5 December 2003 (signed off on 30 November), with yet another announcement of the completion of the BAM project.

During the Russo-Ukrainian War, on 30 November 2023, Ukrainian media reported that four explosive devices exploded in the tunnel during the movement of a freight train composed of 41 tank cars carrying diesel fuel plus three cars carrying aviation fuel. A fire in the tunnel was also reported by Russian media. The Security Service of Ukraine claimed to be behind the incident. With the tunnel out of commission, Russia redirected traffic to the bypass. The next day (1 December), the Security Service of Ukraine claimed to have caused a train with fuel cars to explode while crossing the Devil's Bridge on the 1989 bypass. The tunnel was reopened on 2 December.

== Current status ==
With the opening of the tunnel, the time required for a train to cross the section reduced to only 15 minutes. However, the newer bypass is still used for westbound trains and local trains to allow eastbound trains to pass through the single-track tunnel. The opening of the tunnel also allowed 6 million t (6.6 million short tons) of freight annually to be switched onto the BAM from the Trans-Siberian Railway.

== Future ==
The cost of doubling the tunnel to increase the capacity from 16 to 34 train pairs per day and from 16 to 100 million t (18 to 110 million short tons) per year, with intervals between trains of not more than 10 minutes, was budgeted at 260.79 billion rubles (US$4.16 billion), according to a 2018 feasibility study by the Institute for Economy and Transport Development. Building a second tunnel was estimated to take approximately ten years. Construction of the Second Severomuysky Tunnel was expected to start in 2019. A study published in the International Scientific Siberian Transport Forum TransSiberia - 2021, explains the need for a second tunnel. The study has maps depicting the railway network in the region.

== Gallery ==
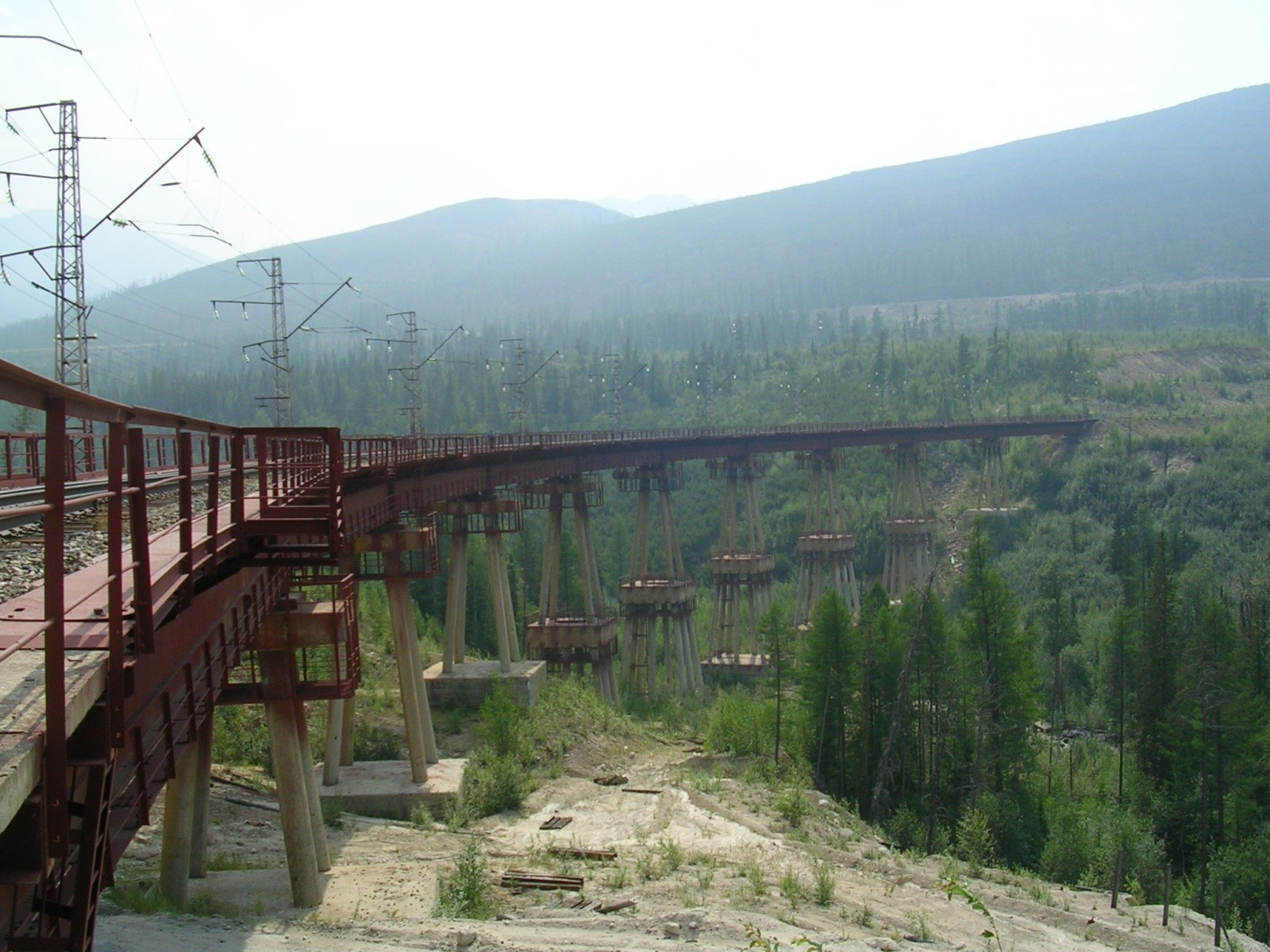
Devil's Bridge on the 1989 bypass

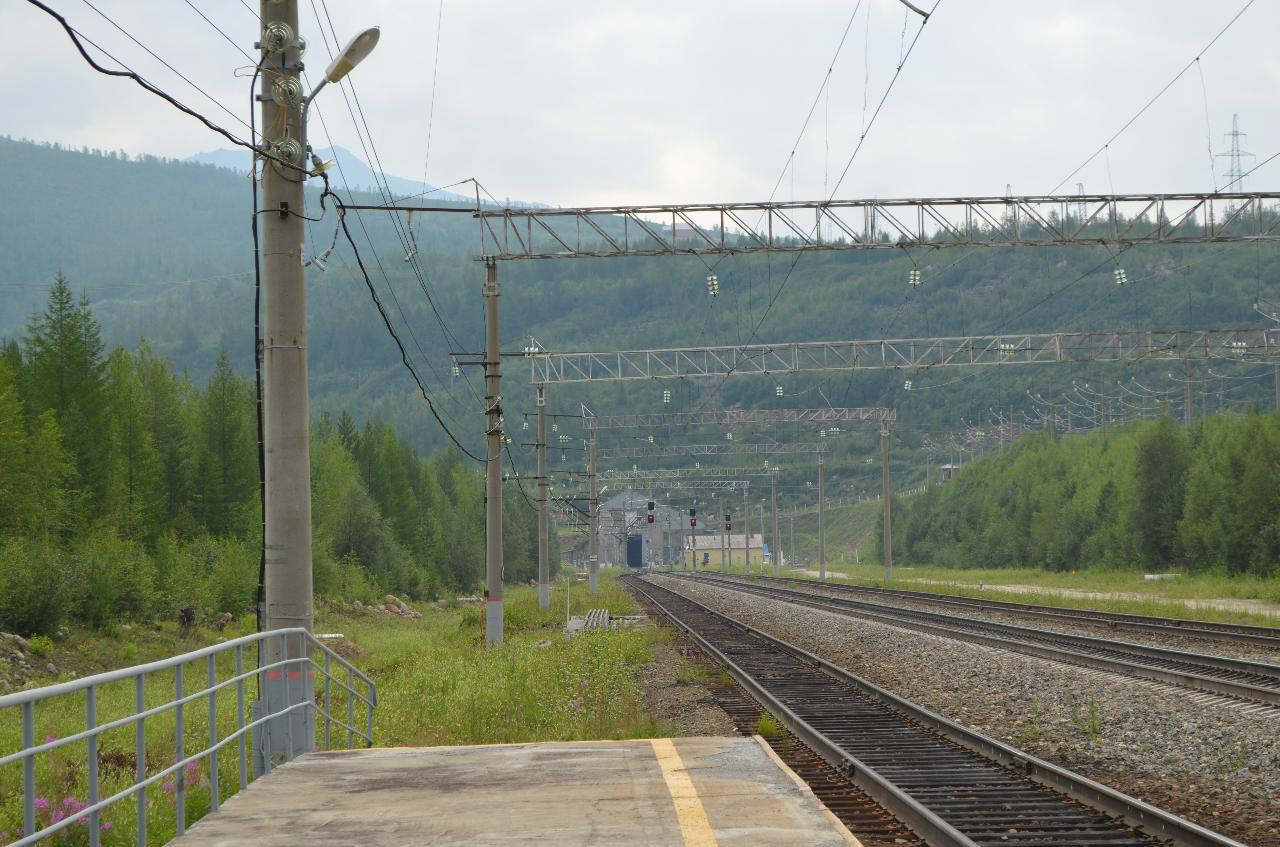
Western portal of the Severomuysky tunnel viewed from Itykit station

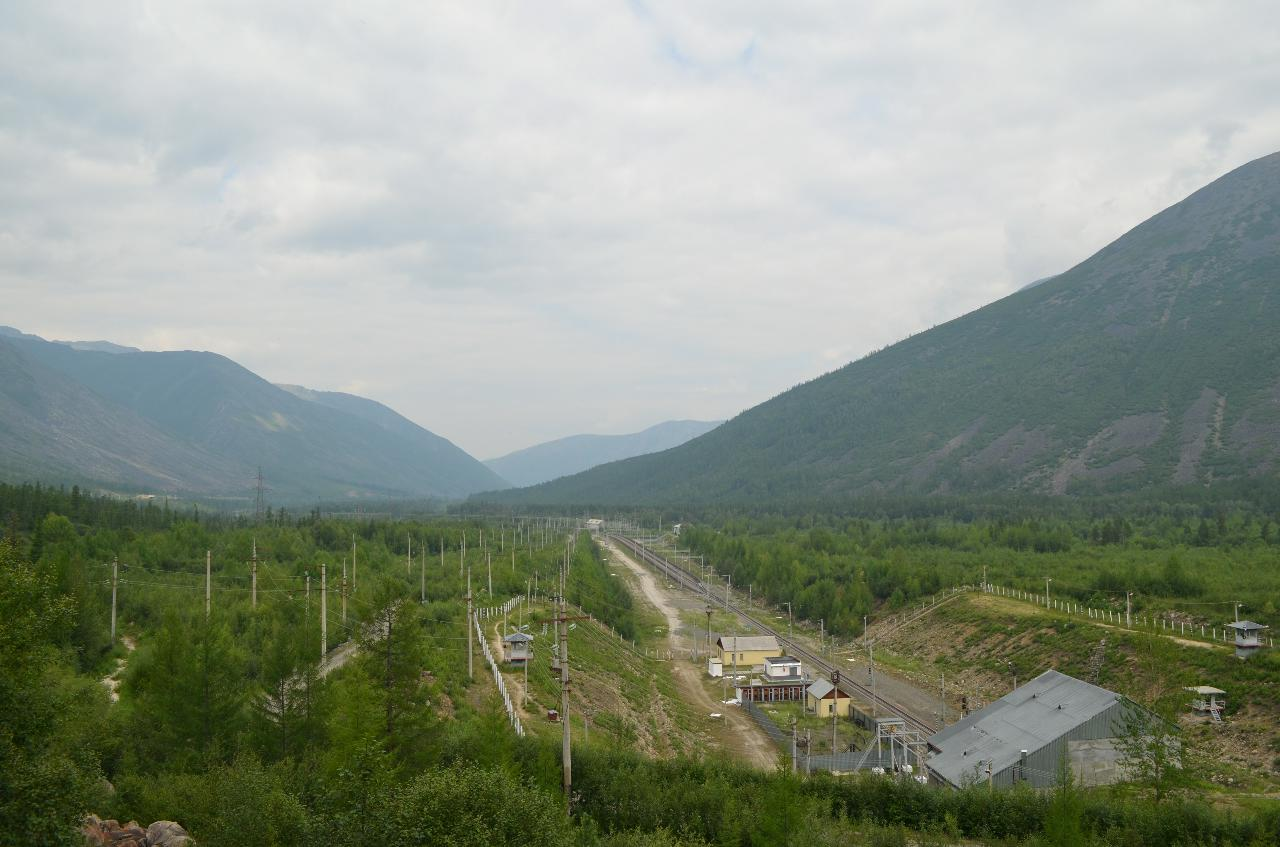
View from above the western portal of the Severomuysky tunnel, looking west

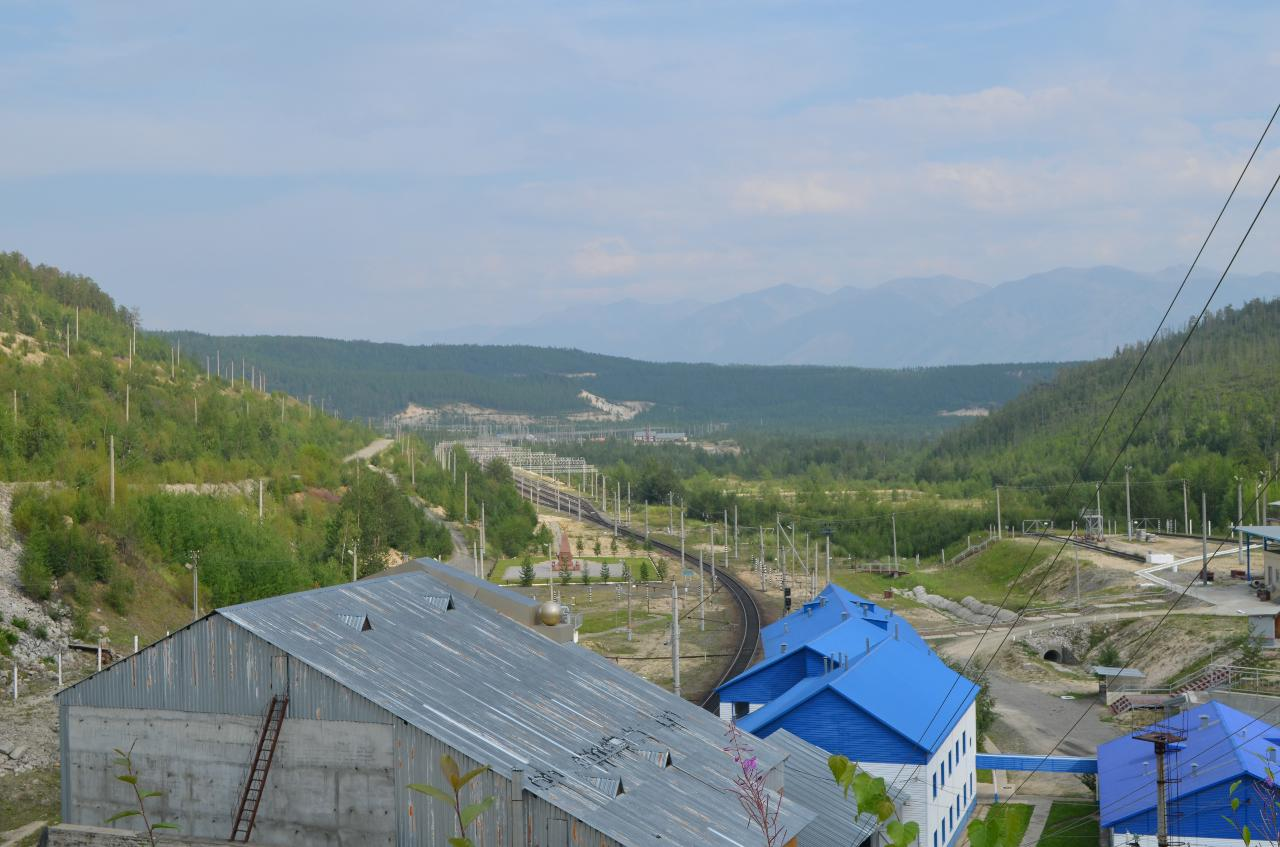
View from above the eastern portal of the Severomuysky tunnel, looking east

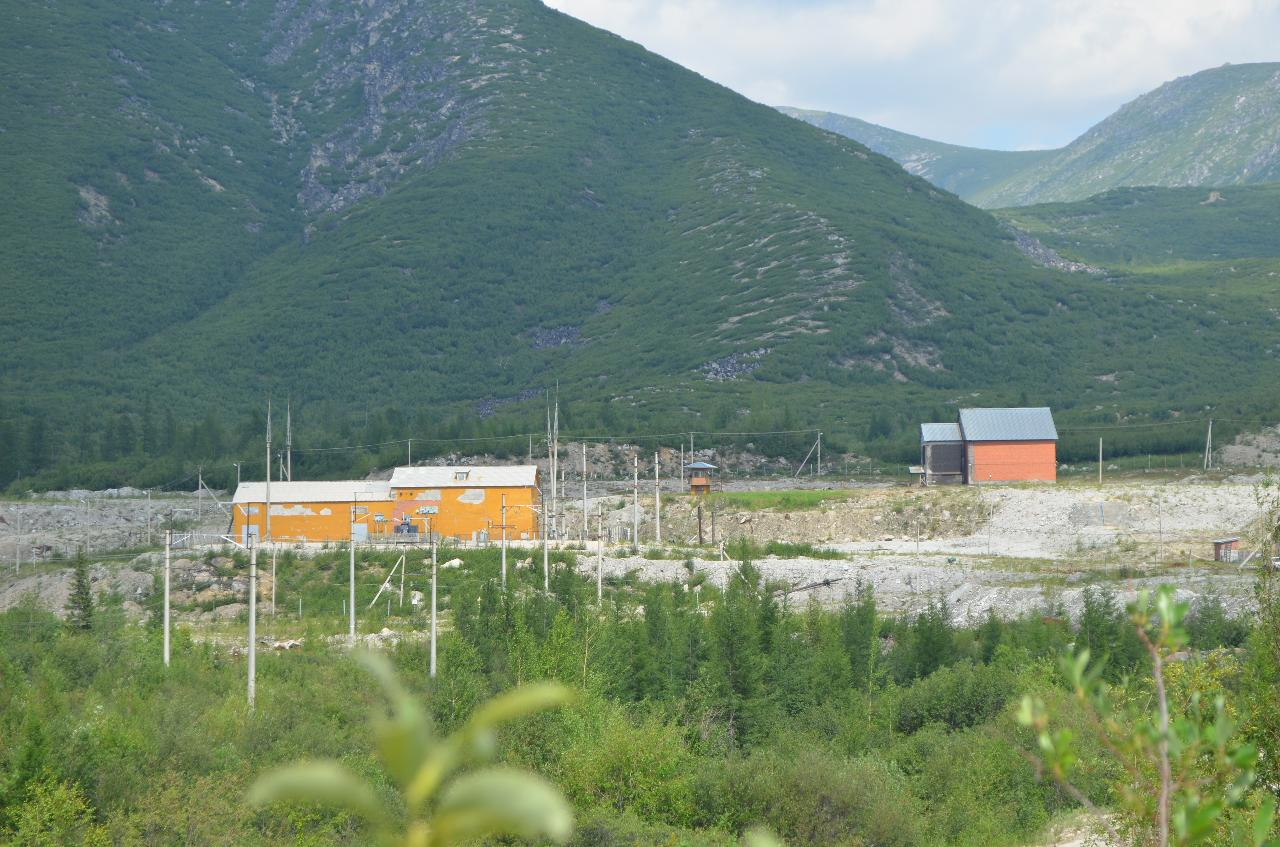
View of terrain looking across the top of the tunnel midway along

== See also ==
- Dusse-Alin Tunnel
- List of longest tunnels
