= Novy Urgal =

Coordinates: 51°04′25″N 132°33′51″E

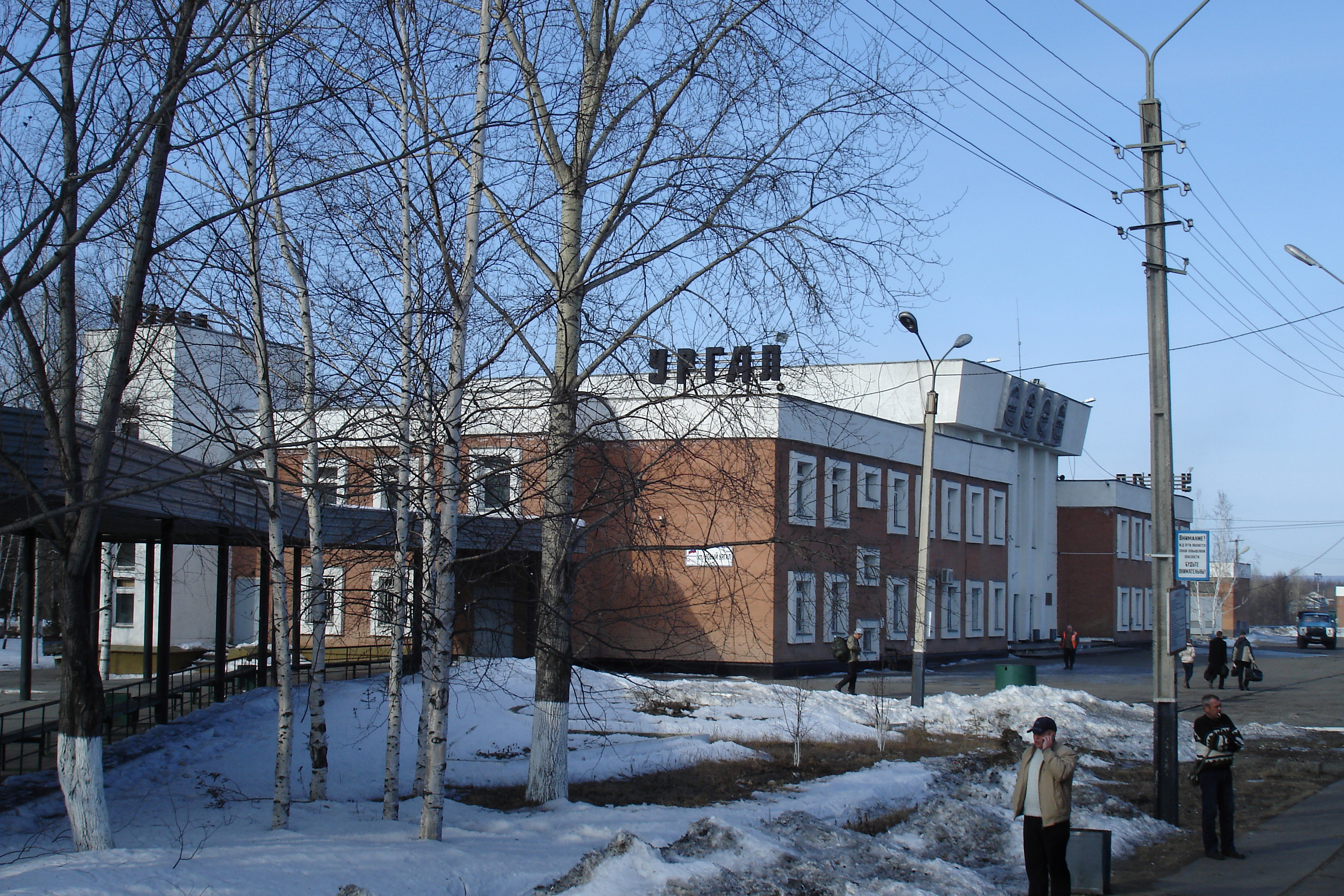
Novy Urgal station

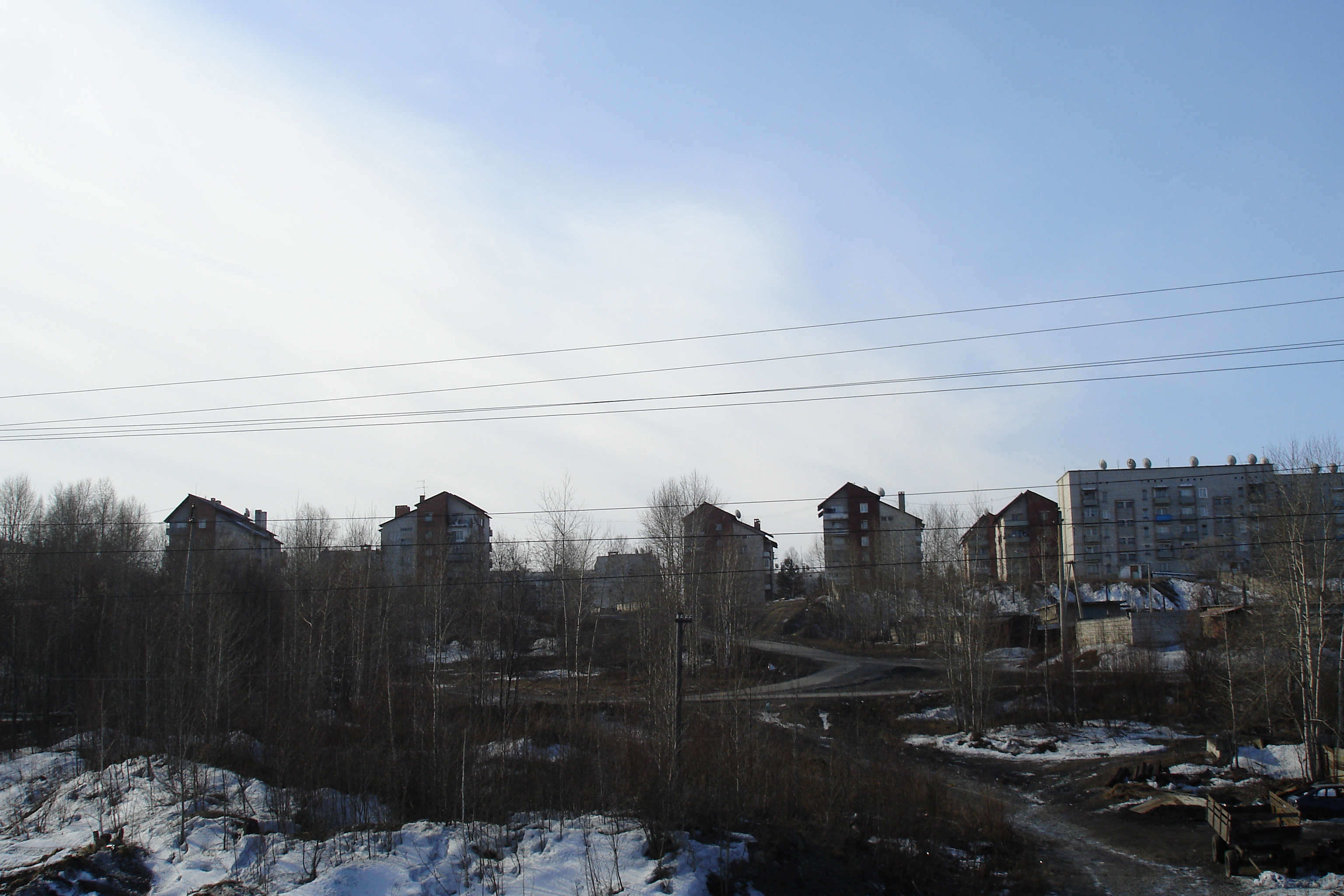
View of Novy Urgal from the train

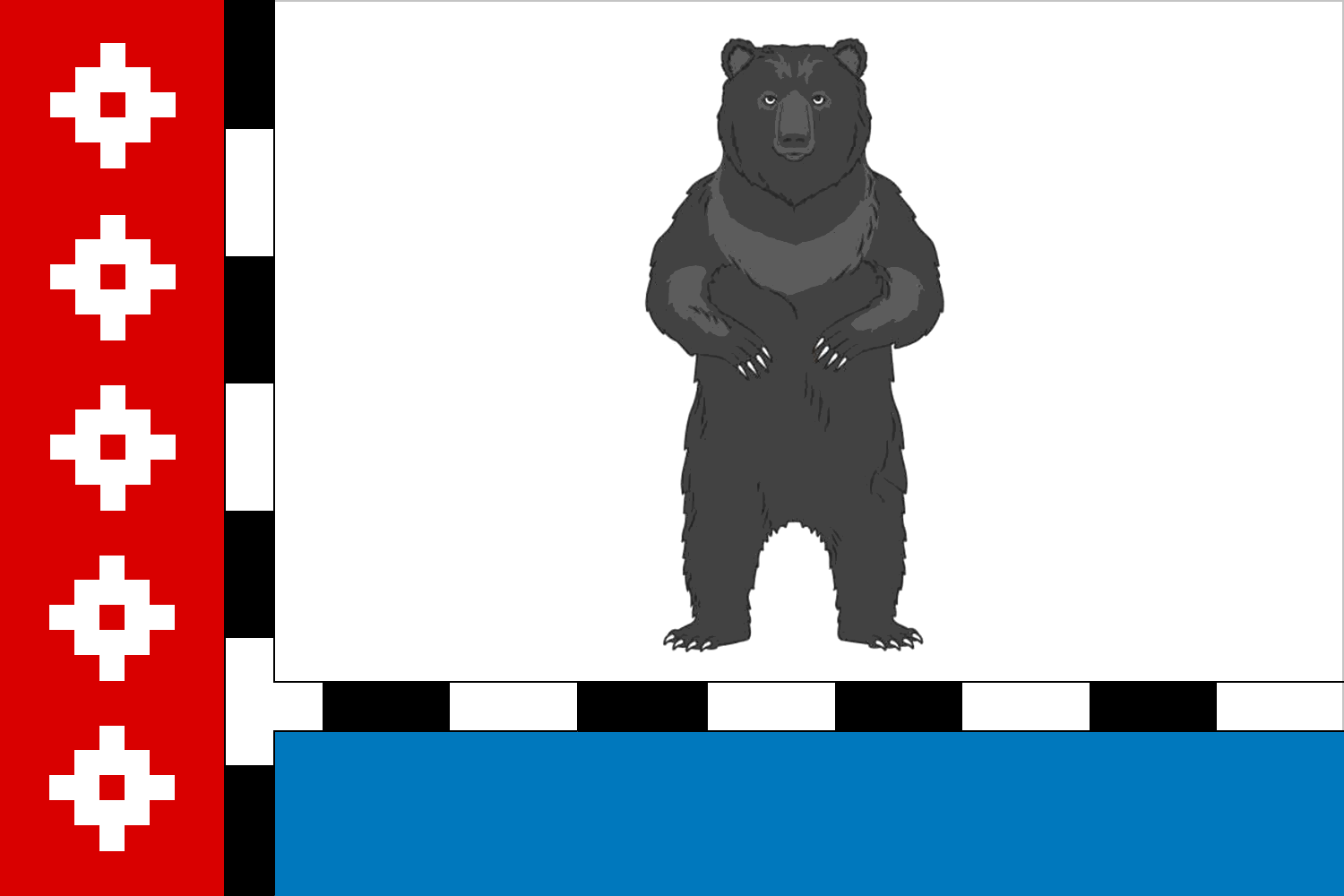
Flag of Novy Urgal

Novy Urgal (Russian: Но́вый Урга́л) is an urban locality (a work settlement) in Verkhnebureinsky District of Khabarovsk Krai, Russia, located in the valley of the Bureya River, close to its confluence with the Urgal River, about 340 kilometers (210 mi) northwest of the krai's administrative center of Khabarovsk and 28 kilometers (17 mi) west of the district's administrative center of Chegdomyn. Population: 6,803 (2010 census); 7,274 (2002 census); 9,126 (1989 Soviet census).

== History ==
It was founded in 1974 in conjunction with the construction of the Baikal-Amur Mainline (BAM), near the original village of Urgal, located on the river of the same name. The railway line connecting the Trans-Siberian Railway at Isvestokovaya to the nearby Chegdomyn coal fields had already run through the Urgal area since 1951, after an earlier construction project was dismantled before completion during World War II.

A large junction station between the BAM and the old line was built, along with the settlement, by workers from the then Ukrainian SSR. As part of the BAM construction project, sections of the line were placed under the patronage of Komsomol brigades from different parts of the Soviet Union.

In 1985, Novy Urgal was granted urban-type settlement status. 1989 saw the commencement of regular traffic between Tynda and Komsomolsk-on-Amur, after the completion of the railway a large proportion of the inhabitants left the settlement, its population dropping from 9,126 in 1989 to 6,779 in 2006.

== Transportation ==
Novy Urgal is an important station on the BAM, located on the junction of the BAM and the Isvestkovaya–Chegdomyn line. The station, originally named Urgal-II, is located ten kilometers to the east, in the original village of Urgal) with its large locomotive depot, is the main economic focus of the settlement. The BAM crosses the Bureya River over a 600-meter-long (2,000 ft) bridge located 9 kilometers (5.6 mi) west of the settlement.
