= Baikal–Amur Mainline =

Russian rail road route

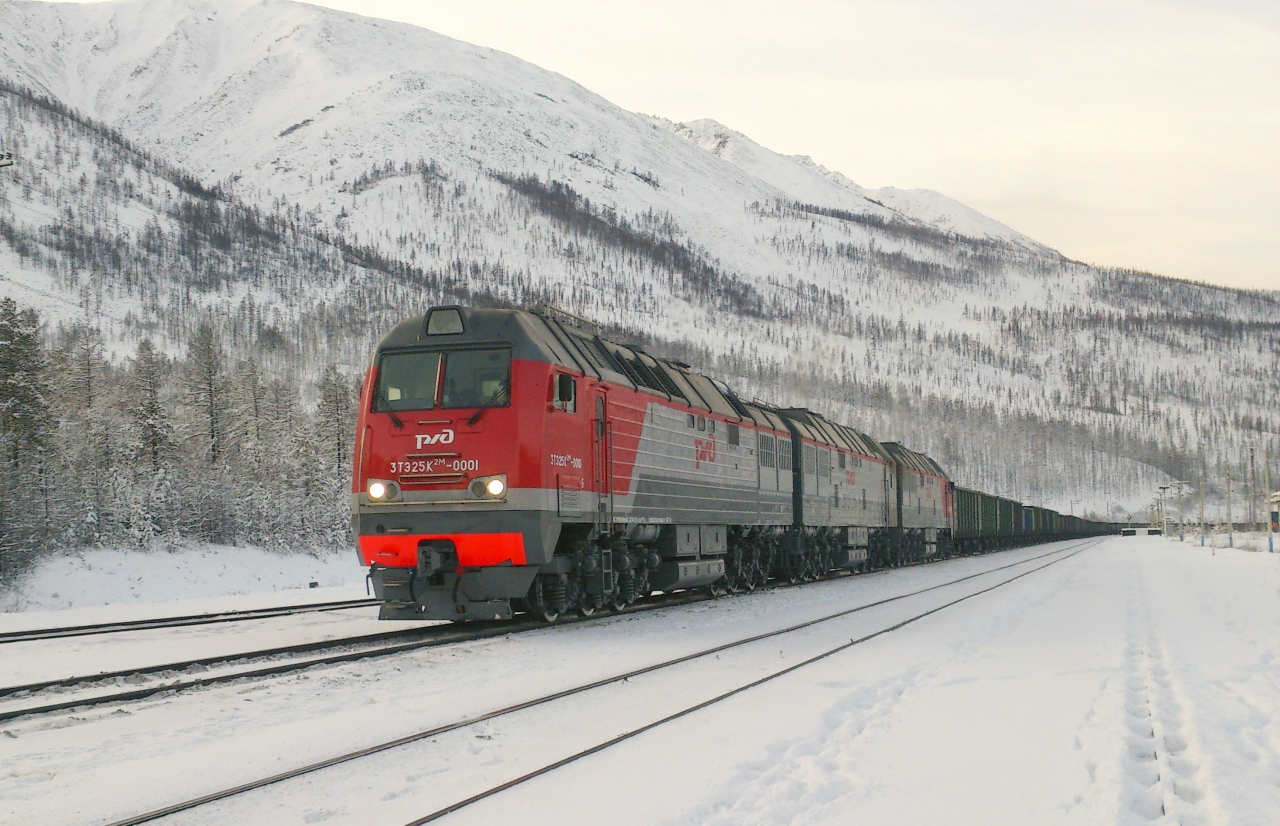
- RZD 3TE25K2M hauling freight at the Baikal–Amur Mainline

Overview
- Native name: Байкало-Амурская магистраль
- Status: Operational
- Owner: Russian Railways
- Locale: Eastern Siberia; Russian Far East
- Termini: Tayshet; Sovetskaya Gavan
- Continues from: Trans-Siberian Railway

Service
- Type: Regional rail; Freight rail
- System: East Siberian Railway (Tayshet– Khani); Far Eastern Railway (Khani–Sovetskaya Gavan)
- Operator: Russian Railways

Technical
- Line length: 4,324 km (2,687 mi)
- Number of tracks: 2–1
- Track gauge: 1,520 mm (4 ft 11 27/32 in) Russian gauge
- Electrification: 25 kV 50 Hz AC overhead lines

The Baikal–Amur Mainline (Russian: Байкало-Амурская магистраль, БАМ, Baikalo-Amurskaya magistral', BAM) is a 1,520 mm (4 ft 11 27/32 in) broad-gauge railway line in Russia. Traversing Eastern Siberia and the Russian Far East, the 4,324 km (2,687 mi)-long BAM runs about 610 to 770 km (380 to 480 mi) north of and parallel to the Trans-Siberian Railway.

The Soviet Union built the BAM as a strategic alternative route to the Trans–Siberian Railway, seen as vulnerable especially along the sections close to the border with China. The BAM cost $14 billion, and it was built with special, durable tracks since much of it ran over permafrost. Due to the severe terrain, weather, length and cost, Soviet general secretary Leonid Brezhnev described BAM in 1974 as "the construction project of the century".

If the permafrost layer that supports the BAM railway line were to melt, the railway would collapse and sink into peat bog layers that cannot bear its weight. In 2016 and 2018 there were reports about climate change and damage to buildings and infrastructure as a result of thawing permafrost.

== Route ==
Map of major railways in Russia, with Trans-Siberian Railway shown in red, the Baikal-Amur Mainline in green and the Amur–Yakutsk Mainline (including "Little BAM") shown in orange

The BAM departs from the Trans-Siberian railway at Tayshet, then crosses the Angara River at Bratsk and the Lena River at Ust-Kut, proceeds past Severobaikalsk at the northern tip of Lake Baikal, past Tynda and Khani, crosses the Amur River at Komsomolsk-on-Amur and finally reaches the Pacific Ocean at Sovetskaya Gavan. There are 21 tunnels along the line, with a total length of 47 km (29 mi). There are also more than 4,200 bridges, with a total length of over 400 kilometres (250 mi).

Of the whole route, only the western Tayshet-Taksimo sector of 1,469 km (913 mi) is electrified. The route is largely single-track, although the reservation is wide enough for double-tracking for its full length, in the case of eventual duplication. The unusual thing about the railway is that it is electrified with a 27.5 kV, 50 Hz catenary minimum height at 6.5 metres (21 ft 4 in) above top of the rails to suit double-stacking under the overhead wires on the Russian gauge tracks, which requires electric locomotives to be modified for service on the railway.

At Tynda the route is crossed by the Amur–Yakutsk Mainline, which runs north to Neryungri and Tommot, with an extension to Nizhny Bestyakh opened in 2019. The original section of the AYaM connecting the Trans-Siberian at Bamovskaya with the BAM at Tynda is also referred to as the "Little BAM".

During the winter the passenger trains go from Moscow past Tayshet and Tynda to Neryungri and Tommot and there are also a daily trains from Tynda to Komsomolsk-on-Amur and from Komsomolsk-on-Amur to Sovetskaya Gavan on the Pacific Ocean via Vanino ("Vladivostok-Sovetskaya Gavan" train No.351Э). Travel time from Tayshet to Tynda is 48 hours. Travel time from Tynda to Komsomolsk-on-Amur is 36 hours. Travel time from Komsomolsk-on-Amur to Sovetskaya Gavan is 13 hours.

There are ten tunnels along the BAM railway, totaling 30 kilometres (19 miles) of route. They include:

- Baikalsky tunnel 6,685 metres (4.154 mi)
- Severomuysky Tunnel 15,343 metres (9.534 mi)
- Kodar Tunnell 1,981 metres (1.231 mi)
- Dusse-Alin Tunnel 1,852 metres (1.151 mi)
- Korshunovsky tunnel 950 metres (3,120 ft)

These are among the longest tunnels in Russia.

In addition, the route crosses 11 full-flowing rivers (including the Lena, Amur, Zeya, Vitim, Olyokma, Selemdzha and Bureya). In total, 2230 large and small bridges were built on it.

== History ==
=== Early plans and start of construction ===
The route of the present-day BAM first came under consideration in the 1880s as an option for the eastern section of the planned Trans-Siberian railway.

In the 1930s, labor-camp inmates, in particular from the Bamlag camp of the Gulag system, built the section from Tayshet to Bratsk. In a confusing transfer of names, the label BAM applied from 1933 to 1935 to the project to double-track the Trans-Siberian east of Lake Baikal, constructed largely using forced labor.

1945 saw the finalisation of plans for upgrading the BAM for diesel or electric instead of steam traction, and for the heavier axle-loads of eight-axle oil tankers to carry new-found oil from Western Siberia. The upgrading required 25 years and 3,000 surveyors and designers, although much of the redesign work (particularly as regards the central section) took place between 1967 and 1974.

=== Construction project of the century ===
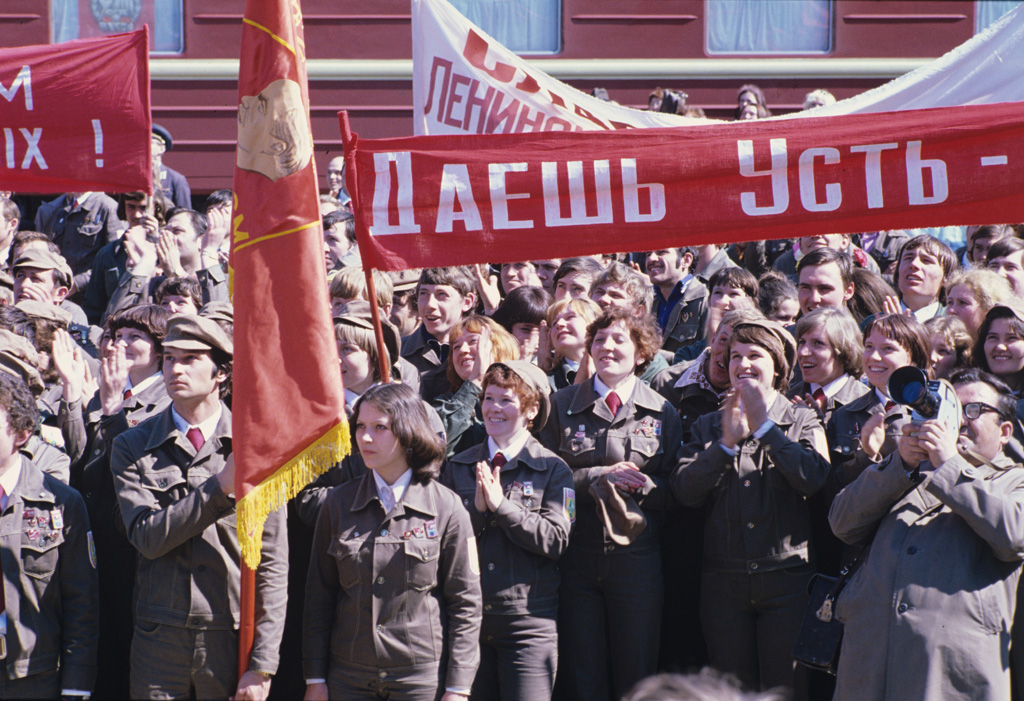
A rally in Ust-Ilimsk, Irkutsk Region, on the occasion of the arrival of a building team for construction of the Baikal-Amur Railway. 1979.

In March 1974, Soviet General Secretary Brezhnev proposed that the BAM would be one of the two major projects in the Tenth Five Year Plan (1976–80). He famously stated that "BAM will be constructed with clean hands only!" and firmly rejected the suggestion to again use prison labor. A few weeks later, he challenged the Young Communist League (Komsomol) to join in "the construction project of the century". The 17th Komsomol congress (held in April 1974) announced the BAM as a Komsomol shock construction project, created the central Komsomol headquarters of BAM construction, and appointed Dmitry Filippov the chief of the headquarters.

By the end of 1974, perhaps 50,000 young people of the 156,000 young people who applied had moved to the BAM service area. In 1975 and 1976, 28 new settlements were inaugurated and 70 new bridges, including the Amur and Lena bridges, were erected. And while 110 miles (180 km) of track was laid, the track-laying rate would have needed to nearly triple to meet the 1983 deadline.

In September 1984, a "golden spike" was hammered into place, connecting the eastern and western sections of the BAM. The Western media was not invited to attend this historic event as Soviet officials did not want any comments about the line's operational status. In reality, only one third of the BAM's track was fully operational for civilians, due to military reasons.

The BAM was again declared complete in 1991. By then, the total cost to build the line was US$14 billion (RU₽106 trillion).

=== Crisis ===
Beginning in the mid-1980s, the BAM project attracted increasing criticism for having been poorly planned. Infrastructure and basic services like running water were often not in place when workers arrived. At least 60 boomtowns developed along the route, but today many of these places are deserted ghost towns and unemployment in the area is high. The building of the BAM has also been criticised for its complete lack of environmental protection.

When the Soviet Union was dissolved, numerous mining and industrial projects in the region were cancelled and the BAM was greatly underutilized until the late 1990s, running at a large operational deficit.

In 1996, the BAM as a single operational body was dissolved, with the western section from Tayshet to Khani becoming the East Siberian Railway and the rest transferred to the management of the Far Eastern Railway.

During the Russo-Ukrainian War, on November 30, 2023, an explosion occurred in the Severomuysky Tunnel. A second explosion happened soon thereafter on the bypass used as backup for the tunnel. The Security Service of Ukraine claimed responsibility for the explosions.

== Current situation and future prospects ==
A major improvement was the opening of the 15.34-kilometre (9.53 mi) Severomuysky Tunnel on 5 December 2003. It is up to 1.5 kilometres (nearly 1 mile) deep. Construction took 27 years to complete. Prior to this, the corresponding route segment was 54 km (34 mi) long, with heavy slopes necessitating the use of auxiliary bank engine locomotives.

With the resources boom of recent years and improving economic conditions in Russia, use of the line is increasing. Plans exist for the development of mining areas such as Udokanskoye and Chineyskoye near Novaya Chara, as well as one of Eurasia's largest coal deposits at Elginskoye (Elga) in the Sakha Republic (Yakutia). In connection with this, a number of branch lines have been built or are under construction.

In January 2012 the Russian mining company Mechel completed the construction of the 320-kilometre-long branch line to Elginskoye, branching from the BAM station Ulak, west of the Zeya River crossing in northwestern Amur Oblast. The branch line connects the Elginskoye coal mine to the Russian railroad network.

Currently under discussion is the construction of a bridge or tunnel under the Strait of Tartary to Sakhalin Island, with the possibility of the further construction of a bridge or tunnel from Sakhalin to Japan. A tunnel from the mainland to Sakhalin was previously begun under Joseph Stalin, but was abandoned after his death. A second attempt in 2003 was also postponed during construction. Current economic conditions make the short-term completion of the tunnel doubtful, although Russian president Dmitry Medvedev announced in November 2008 his support for a revival of this project.

The BAM now also attracts the interest of Western railway enthusiasts, with some tourist activity on the line.

Also, the BAM itself extension from Komsomolsk-on-Amur to Magadan (Okhotsk coastal route), full length electrification, full length track doubling, and double-stacking under the overhead wires on the Russian gauge tracks (with well cars to make 6.15m height) are proposed.

Tayshet diversion line
(Tayshet bypass)

Severo-Sibirskaya Mainline

Lena-Kamchatka Mainline

== Along the BAM ==
Major stations of the BAM

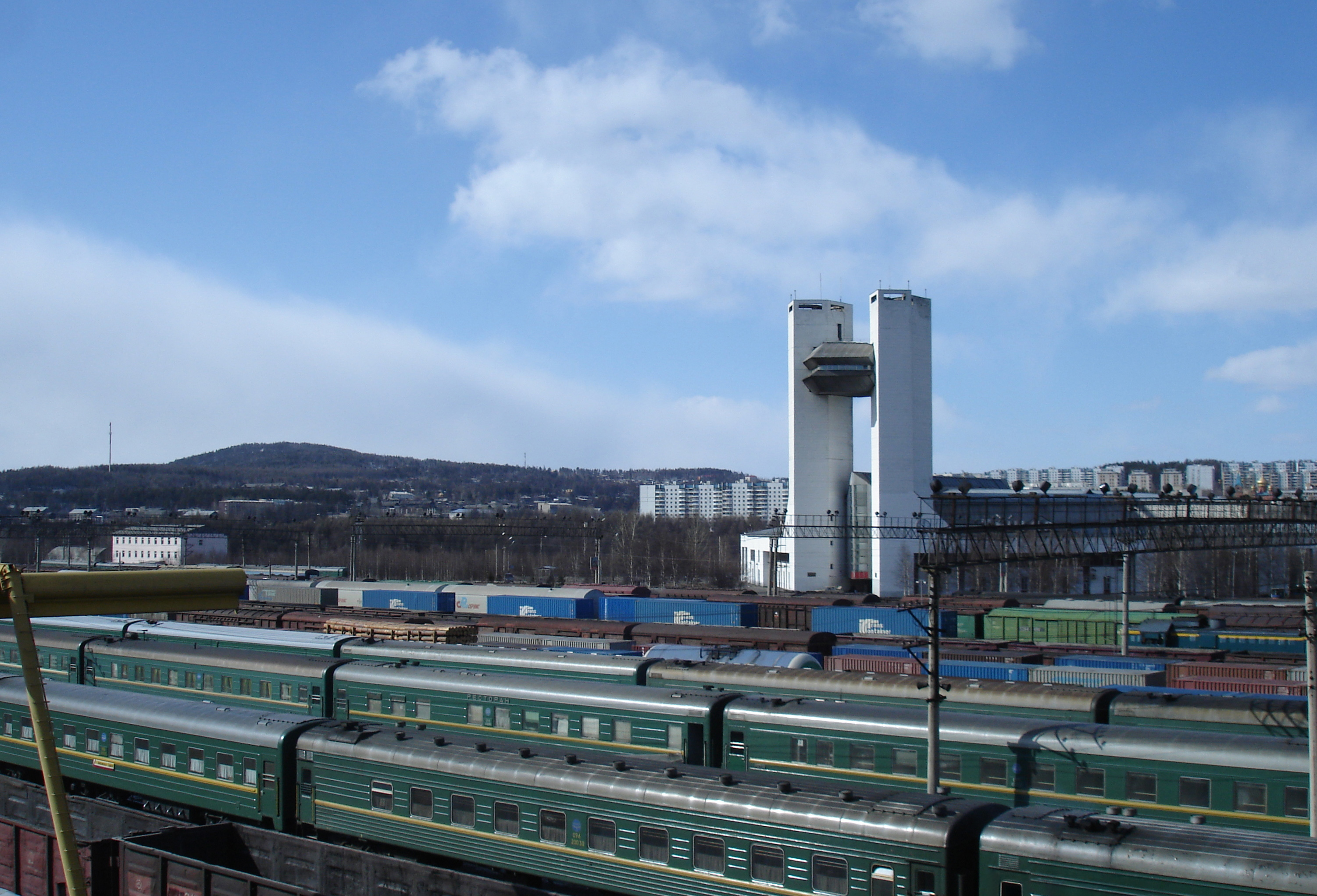
Tynda, the "capital" of BAM

Tayshet to Lake Baikal 1,064 kilometres (661 mi):

0	Tayshet: about 300 kilometres (190 miles) east of Krasnoyarsk, Trans-Siberian Railway, M53 highway to Irkutsk
129	Sosnovye Rodniki: timber port; Chuna River
142	Chuna
269	Vikhorevka: railway administration
282	Anzebi: 20-kilometre (12 mi) spur line to Bratsk
330	Railway runs across the top of the Bratsk Dam
463	Vidim
546	Sredneilimskaya on the Ust-Ilimsk reservoir
554	Zheleznogorsk-Ilimsky: mining town
575	Khrebetovaya: branch line north to Ust-Ilimsk (see branches below); enters Lena basin; Kuta River
715	Ust-Kut: port on the Lena River where goods are loaded onto boats for transport north; end of the line until 1974
736	Lena Vostochnaya: east of the Lena, start of the BAM proper from 1974; route turns east southeast
786	Zvyozdnaya: first new town built on the BAM
890	Kirenga: 12 kilometres (7.5 miles) east is the larger town of Magistralnyy; Kirenga River and bridge
931	Ul'kan: on the Ulkan branch of the Kirenga
1,005	Delbichenda: last stop before the 6.7-kilometre (4.2 mi) Baikal Mountain Tunnel (between 1979 and 1984 there was a 15-kilometre (9.3 mi) bypass over the mountain)
1,014	Daben
1,064	Lake Baikal

Lake Baikal to Tynda 1,300 kilometres (810 mi):

1,064
Severobaykalsk; four small tunnels along the lake
1,104
Nizhneangarsk; leave Lake Baikal, northeast along the Upper Angara River

valley

1,257
Novy Uoyan: there is talk of building a railroad south from here to the Trans-Siberian; enters Severomuysk Mountains; much permafrost from here to Tynda
1,385–1,400
Severomuysky Tunnel: 15.7 kilometres (9.8 mi) long, very difficult construction; leaves mountain; scenic section with mountains to north and south; much fog
1,484
Taksimo: end of electrified section; Muya River
1,548
Shivery: leaves Buryat Republic; Vitim River
1,577
Kuanda: official 'completion' of the BAM was celebrated here in September 1984; valley into mountains
1,664
Kodar: Kodar mountains, 1.9 kilometres (1.2 mi) tunnel
1,734
Novaya Chara
1,879
Khani: the only BAM town in the Sakha Republic; northernmost point on the line; route turns south-southeast along the Olyokma River; enters Amur basin

Tynda to Komsomolsk 1,473 kilometres (915 mi):

2,364	Tynda: Branch railway and highway M56 north to Yakutsk; little BAM south to the Trans-Siberian
2,704	Bridge over Zeya Reservoir; route heads southeast
3,205	Bureya River bridge
3,315	Novy Urgal: Branch south to Trans-Siberian
3,403	east to Dusse-Alin Tunnel; northeast up the Amgun River
3,633	Postyshevo: east
3,697	Evoron Lake; southeast to km 3,837: Komsomolsk-on-Amur

Komsomolsk to Sovetskaya Gavan 486 kilometres (302 mi):

This section was completed by prisoners during World War II, except for the 19-kilometre (12 mi) section east of Komsomolsk which was completed in 1974.

3,819	Komsomolsk; 1,734-metre (5,689 ft) Amur River Bridge
0	Pivan (new zero point)
51	Selikhin: Branch
95–340	Sikhote Alin Mountains
403	Mongokhto
441	Vanino: port, train ferry to Sakhalin Island, practical end of passenger service
467	Sovetskaya Gavan: naval base

In April 2008 the state-owned Bamtonnelstroy corporation started work on the new 3.91-kilometre (2.43 mi) single-track Kuznetsovsky Tunnel to bypass an older tunnel built in 1943–1945. It was opened in December 2012. The old tunnel had difficult gradients; building the new tunnel relieved a bottleneck on the BAM. The 59.8 bn roubles (about $1.93 bn) project included 20 kilometres (12 mi) of new track. In 2010, Yakunin had said, the stretch between Komsomolsk and Sovetskaya Gavan was the weakest link on the BAM, which, he said, could be carrying 100 million tons of freight a year in 2050.

=== Branches ===
- 575: Khrebtovaya to Ust-Ilimsk, 214 kilometres (133 mi): opened in 1970, it runs northeast to serve the Ust-Ilimsk Dam.
- 1,257: Novy Uoyan: possible start of line south on east side to Lake Baikal.
- 2,364: Tynda to the Trans-Siberian at Bamovskaya, 180 kilometres (110 mi) (the 'Little BAM'): this branch was built by prisoners in 1933–37, torn up in 1942 and its rails shipped to the front and rebuilt in 1972–75.
- 2,364: Tynda to Yakutsk: see Amur–Yakutsk Mainline.
- 3,315: Novy Urgal to the Trans-Siberian at Izvestovskaya, 328 kilometres (204 mi): in the Bureya River basin, it was built mostly by Japanese POWs. There is a 32 kilometres (20 mi) branch north from Novy Urgal to the Chegdomyn coal fields.
- 3,837: Komsomolsk south to Khabarovsk, 374 kilometres (232 mi); on east side (flood plain) of the Amur. 99 kilometres (62 mi) south: Lake Bolon.
- 51 (line km restart at Komsomolsk): Selikhin to Cherny Mys, 122 kilometres (76 mi): north along the Amur. Built 1950–53, it was planned to extend this to a tunnel to Sakhalin Island. There is talk of restarting it.

== The BAM road ==
Running approximately alongside the railway track is the BAM road, a railway service track. It is said to be in a very poor state, with collapsed bridges, dangerous river crossings, severe potholes and "unrelenting energy-sapping bogs". The narrow, dilapidated Vitim River Bridge (aka Kuandinsky Bridge) that crosses the Vitim river has attracted attention since its first appearance on social media in 2009. The passage of the bridge is forbidden since 2016 but remains a common road for individuals to reach the town of Koanda.

The road is passable only by the most extreme off-road vehicles and adventure motorcycles. In 2009, a group of three experienced motorcycle riders took a whole month to travel from Komsomolsk (in the east) to Lake Baikal.

== Honors ==
Main belt asteroid 2031 BAM, discovered in 1969 by Soviet astronomer Lyudmila Chernykh, is named in honor of the builders of the BAM.

== Gallery ==
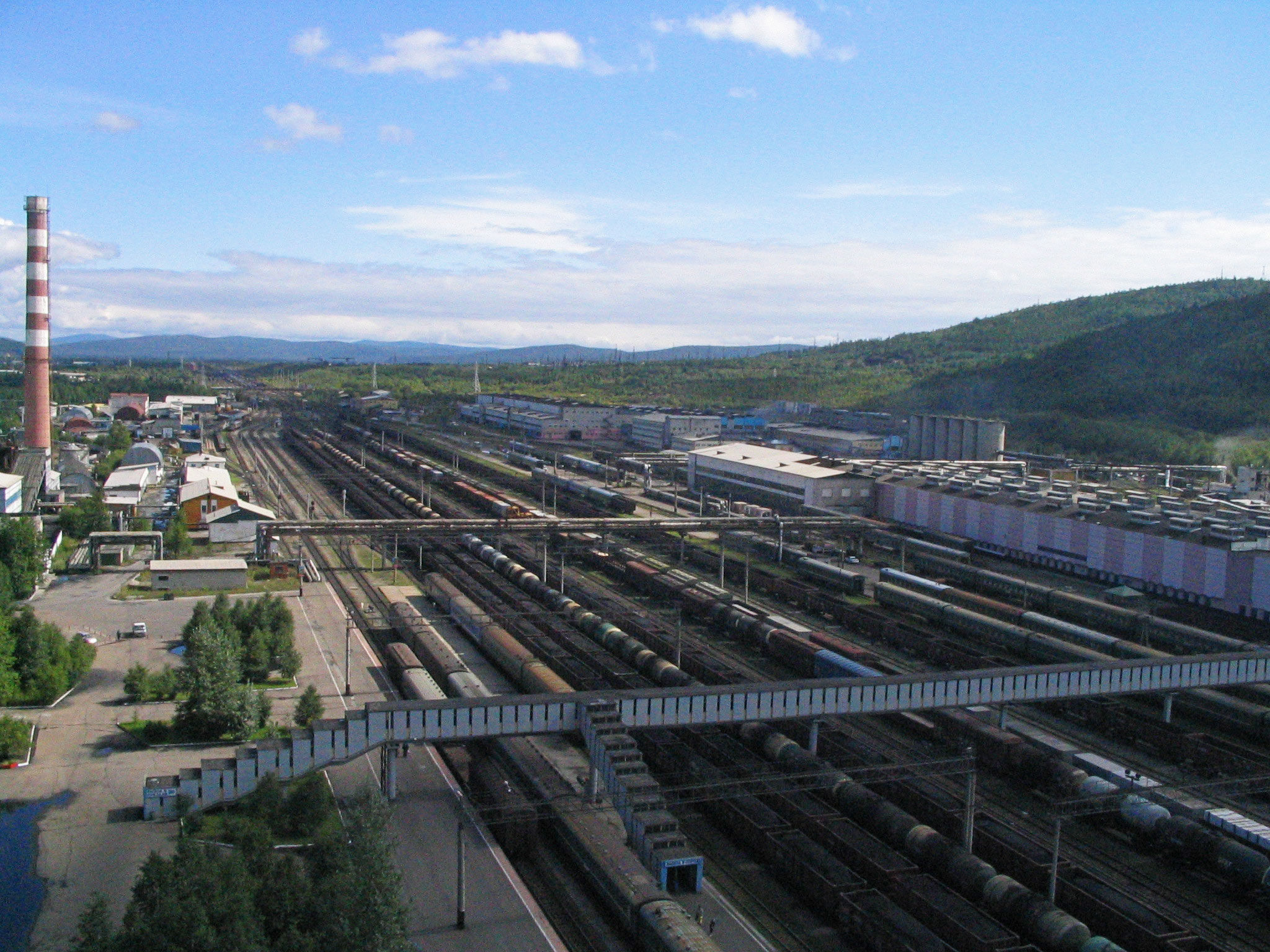
Railway station at Tynda

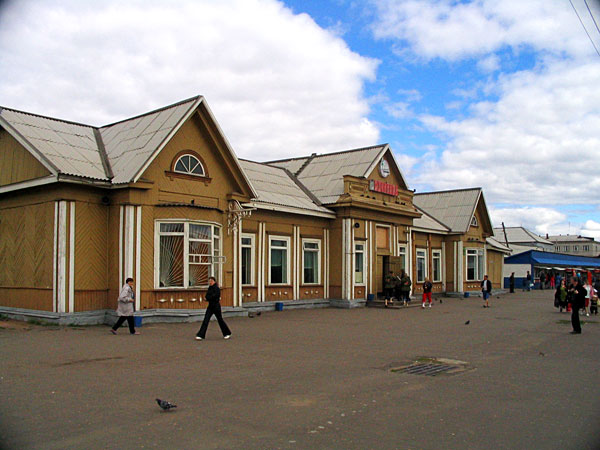
Railway station at Vikhorevka

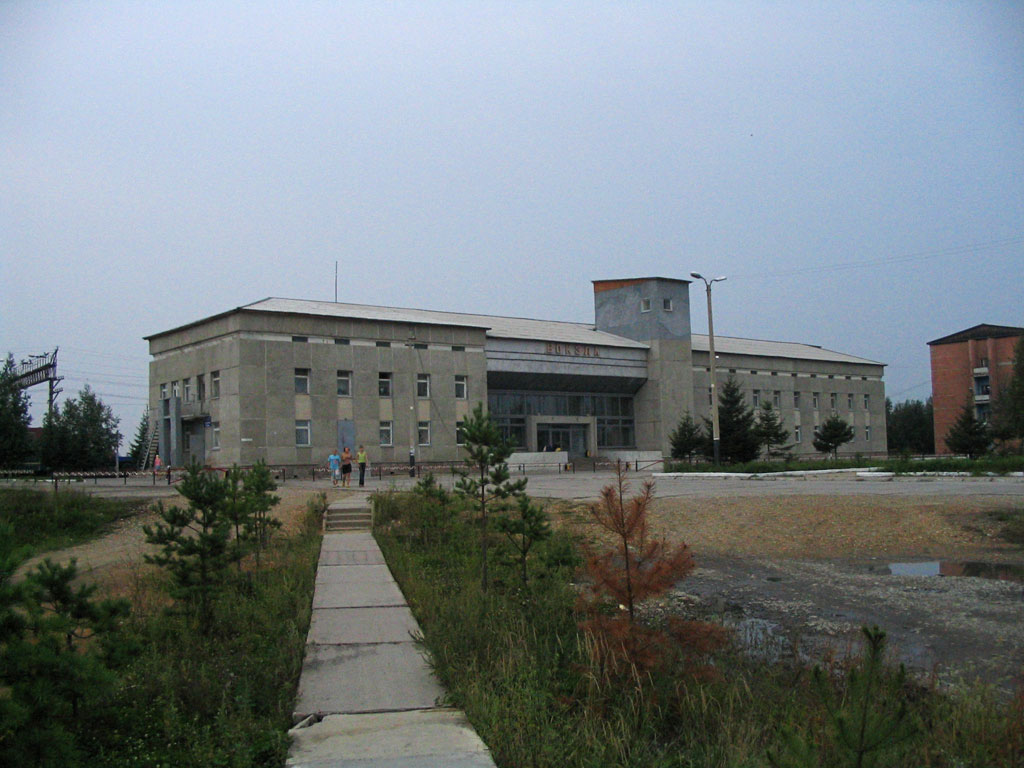
Railway station at Fevralsk

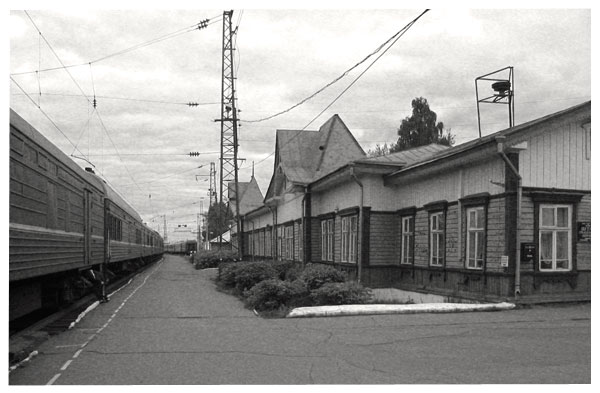
Old station building at Tayshet

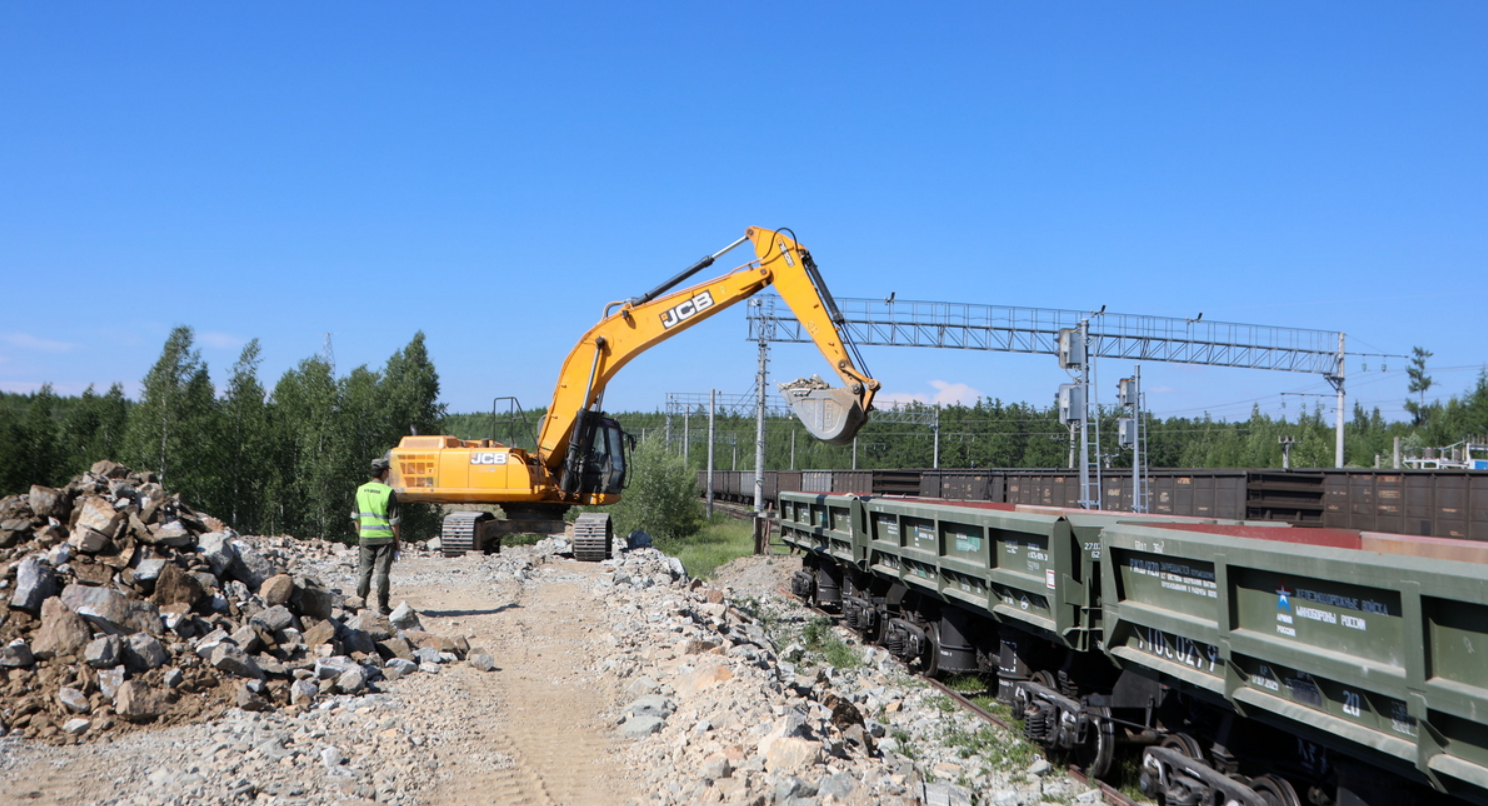
Railway troops on the construction of BAM-2. July 2022
