= Battle of Hutong (1654) =

Russia-Qing China border conflict

- Part of Sino-Russian border conflicts
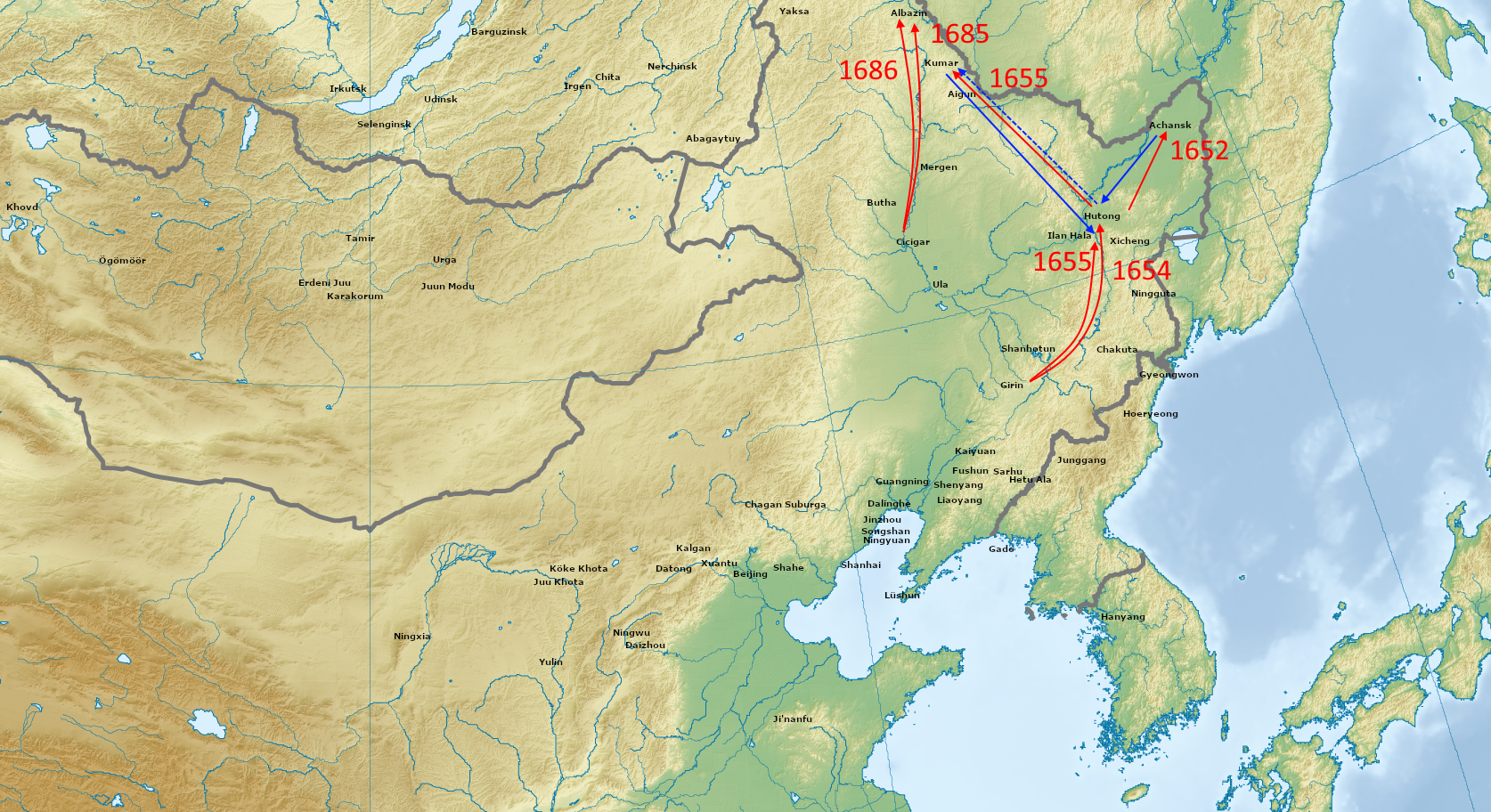
Date	27 April 1654
Location	Songhua River
Result	Qing-Joseon victory

Belligerents
Tsardom of Russia	Qing dynasty Joseon

Commanders and leaders
Onufriy Stepanov	Šarhūda; Byeon Geup

Strength
370 Cossacks; 30 Amurian natives 39 ships	550 Manchus; 300 Daurs; 152 Koreans; 160 ships

The Battle of Hutong was a military conflict between the Tsardom of Russia and the Qing dynasty which occurred in the spring of 1654 on the Songhua River. Korean musketeers were also present from Joseon. It resulted in the retreat of Russian forces.

== Background ==
In 1652, Qing troops led by Haise unsuccessfully attacked the Russian fort at Achansk. Two years later Qing forces returned and forced the Daur villages to relocate away from the Amur River into the valley of the Songhua River, depriving the Russians of provisions.

On 26 March 1654, 152 soldiers from Joseon under the leadership of Byeon Geup departed from Hoeryeong. They joined the Manchu forces at Ningguta after eight days of travelling.

Faced with depleting supplies, the Cossacks abandoned their fortresses and ventured into the inner Amur valley where they encountered the Qing-Joseon forces.

== Battle ==
On 27 April 1654, Onufriy Stepanov and his men encountered the Qing-Joseon forces after sailing three days on the Songhua River. Stepanov had around 400 men and 39 ships while the Qing had 160 ships carrying roughly a thousand men. Despite the numerical disadvantage, the Russian ships were far larger than the opposing vessels, which were basically small boats. The largest ones could carry no more than 17 men. The two sides exchanged fire with the Russians winning out in the end. As the Russian forces chased after their fleeing enemies, they were ambushed by Korean musketeers entrenched on a hill overlooking the river. The Russians attempted to storm the Korean position, but fierce fusillades from the allied Manchu, Daur, and Korean forces inflicted heavy casualties, forcing them to retreat.

== Aftermath ==
The Qing chased the Russian forces for three days, built an earthen fort on the Amur, and retreated to Ningguta by 13 June. Though diminished, Stepanov's forces continued to exert influence on the Amur for several years afterward. Anticipating another attack by the Qing, Stepanov rebuilt the Kamora fortress. On 16 February 1655, Qing commander Mingandali besieged Stepanov's forces. The Qing forces, 10,000 strong, failed to take the fortress and ran out of food, retreating the next month, but not before they had destroyed the Russian ships. At the same time, the Qing resettled the Daurs and Duchers to the Mudan River, depopulating the Amur region.

== Bibliography ==
- Andrade, Tonio (2016), The Gunpowder Age: China, Military Innovation, and the Rise of the West in World History, Princeton University Press, ISBN 978-0-691-13597-7.
- Kang, Hyeok Hweon (2013), "Big Heads and Buddhist Demons: The Korean Musketry Revolution and the Northern Expeditions of 1654 and 1658" (PDF), Journal of Chinese Military History, 2, archived from the original (PDF) on April 24, 2019
- Narangoa, Li (2014), Historical Atlas of Northeast Asia, 1590-2010: Korea, Manchuria, Mongolia, Eastern Siberia, New York: Columbia University Press, ISBN 9780231160704
