= Boris Petrovich Polevoy =

Soviet historian (1918–2002)

Boris Petrovich Polevoy, also Polevoi (Russian: Борис Петрович Полевой; 10 May 1918 – 26 January 2002) was a Soviet historian known for his work on the history of the Russian Far East. He was honored in Kamchatka for his work on the study of the region's history, and has been described in the West as "a leading Soviet specialist on the history of Russian cartography".

== Biography ==
Boris Polevoy was born in Chita, into a family from Saint Petersburg who left it in the spring of 1918, soon after the October Revolution of 1917. Boris' parents - the geologist Petr Ignatyevich Polevoy (Петр Игнатьевич Полевой; 1873–1938) and Antonina Mikhailovna (Антонина Михайловна) Polevoy, née Golovachev - planned to reach Sakhalin Island, but ended up staying for a few months in Chita, in Russian Transbaikalia, where Antonina's relatives lived, and where she gave birth to Boris. The family eventually reached Sakhalin in August 1918, but moved to Vladivostok in early 1920, where Petr Polevoy joined the staff of the Geological Committee; by 1924, he became the Committee's director.

The Polevoys returned to Saint Petersburg, renamed Leningrad, in 1928. Boris entered Leningrad University in 1936. Even though his father was arrested in 1937 and died in prison the following year, Boris managed to graduate from the university with a history degree in 1941. His graduation day, June 22, happened to be the day when Nazi Germany invaded the USSR. Although Boris' advisors recommended him for graduate school, the option was closed to him at the time, due to his father being labeled an "enemy of the people".

Boris received a health-based draft deferment, and spent a few months teaching school in Western Siberia and advising the East Kazakhstan Provincial government, until he was finally drafted by the Army in March 1942. Commissioned as a Second Lieutenant (младший лейтенант) after short training in Andijan, Uzbekistan, he fought on the North Caucasian Front as a commander of a machine-gun platoon. Wounded in October, he spent a while in hospitals, worked for a while for a military office in Sverdlovsk and was eventually discharged from the Army in January 1944.

Polevoy started his teaching career in February 1944, teaching history first at Sverdlovsk School of Music, and later at the History Department of Ural State University.

In October 1945 Boris Polevoy was finally able to enter graduate school at the History Department of Leningrad University, working on a dissertation on the history of the US foreign policy in the mid-19th century, and teaching classes at his department. His advisor was the famous Russian historian Yevgeny Tarle. During the campaign against the "rootless cosmopolitans" in 1949 he was accused by the university ideologists of designing his US history course in a politically inappropriate way, and being influenced by "American capitalist literature", and fired from the department. He was sick and unemployed for a long time, re-entering gainful employment only in November 1952, when the Soviet Navy's Office of Naval History (исторический отдел Главного штаба ВМС) hired him as a senior researcher. But he lost that job too, when the entire Navy Ministry was abolished in 1953.

It was then, in 1953, that the unemployed historian started conducting research of his own in Russian archives, studying the history of Russia's expansion into the Pacific Region - the provinces now commonly known as the Russian Far East - during the 17th through 19th centuries. It remained the area of his interests for the rest of his research career. The next year (1954), he became affiliated with the Russian Geographical Society - an affiliation which also continued to be important for him for the rest of his life.

B.P. Polevoy was able to defend his Cand. Hist. Sci. dissertation only many years later, after which (in 1970) he was invited to join the Leningrad Branch of the N. N. Miklukho-Maklai Institute of Ethnology and Anthropology of the USSR Academy of Sciences. The years of his work at the institute, which lasted until his retirement in 1997, were the most stable and productive period of his career. During this period (in 1986) he was awarded his Doctor of Science degree for his dissertation on the topic of "Russian Geographical Discoveries in the Far East from the 1630s until the 1860s" ("Русские географические открытия на Дальнем Востоке с 30-х годов XVII века до 60-х годов XIX в.").

Over his career, B.P. Polevoy was the author of over 300 publications, including ten books. His publications concerned the history of Russian exploration in the Amur Valley, Sakhalin Island, Kuril Islands, Kamchatka, as well as the early contacts between Russia and Japan.

While comparatively little of Polevoy's work is available in English, he contributed (together with Elena Okladnikova) a section on "Historical Accounts of Mapmaking" in the "Traditional Cartography in Arctic and Subarctic Eurasia" chapter of The History of Cartography (in volume 2, book 3; edited by David Woodward and G. Malcolm Lewis).

== The Amur Valley ==
One of major topics of B.P. Polevoy's research was the Russians' abortive expansion into the Amur Valley during the mid- to late 17th century. He expressed his, often controversial, but always erudite, opinions on a number of issues that have long been the topic of contention among the historians of the period.

=== The Duchers ===
One of the issues B.P. Polevoy weighed in on was the identity of the somewhat enigmatic Duchers (or Juchers) - the agriculturists whom the Cossacks of the 1650s encountered on the middle Amur and the lower Sungari, only to see them disappear from the region a few years later, when the Manchu government evacuated them further south, out of the reach of Russian tribute-seekers. Based on his analysis of the Ducher personal names preserved in Russian records, B.P. Polevoy was arguing in a number of works since the 1960s until practically the end of his life that the Duchers were simply the Nanais, who still live in the region (but who, unlike the historical Duchers, have been always known primarily as fishermen, rather than farmers). According to other participants of the discussion (who, both before and after Polevoy, usually thought the Duchers to have been an offshoot of the Jurchens), Polevoy's opinion has not been supported by other experts in the history or languages of the region.

=== Location of the 17th century Cossack sites on the Amur ===
Another problem often discussed in the Russian literature on the history of the Amur valley region is the location of various ostrogs (forts, or sometimes just slightly fortified winter camps) built by the raiders of Yerofey Khabarov and at a number of sites along the Amur and its tributaries, and the identification of various ostrogs whose names we know from the historical account with the 17th-century archaeological sites that have been discovered on the Amur since the 1850s. Particular attention is often paid to Fort Achansk, or Achansky Gorodok - a winter camp used by Khabarov's band in the land of the Achan people (a Nanai tribe) in 1651/52, which in March 1652 became the site of the first engagement between the Russian Cossacks and Manchu troops, and which has traditionally been considered the predecessor of the later Khabarovsk. Various scholars have proposed a number of sites for Achansk, on both sides of the river upstream and downstream of Khabarovsk, since Richard Maack in 1859 identified it with the ruins on Cape Kyrma, which is located on the southern (Chinese) shore of the Amur, upstream of Khabarovsk. B.P. Polevoy, however, believed that Khabarov's Achansk was the village later known as Odzhal-Bolon (Russian: Оджал-Болонь), located on the left bank of the Amur, closer to Amursk than to Khabarovsk. One of his arguments was that both Khabarov's Achan (sometimes also spelled by the explorer as Otshchan, Отщан), and Wuzhala (乌扎拉) of the Chinese records of the 1652 engagement are based on the name of the Nanai clan "Odzhal" (Оджал), corresponding to the 20th-century name of the village as well. (Incidentally, the name of the clan was also written as "Uzala", as in the name of its best known member, Dersu Uzala).

B.P. Polevoy's view appeared to gain wide support among the Russian geographer community; petitioned by the Amur Branch of the Russian Geographical Society, the Russian Government renamed the village of Odzhal to Achan in 1977, to celebrate its connection with Khabarov's raid. Polevoy himself considered the renaming somewhat pointless, however, since from his point of view Khabarov's "Achan" was simply a corruption of the clan name, which was already reflected in the name of the village.

As to the Cape Kyrma ruins, thought by Maack to be the remains of Achansk, B.P. Polevoy identified them as the remains of another ostrog - namely, Kosogorsky Ostrog, where Onufriy Stepanov stayed a few years later.

=== Polyakov's Mutiny ===
A more important issue on which Polevoy made a contribution was that of the role of Yerofey Khabarov in the Russian expansion of the Amur basin in the 1650s. Practically since the "discovery" of Khabarov for the Russian reader by Russian archivists and journalists in 1840, Khabarov was viewed by the Russian public mostly as a hero, early on becoming sort of a civil "patron saint" for the city of Khabarovsk, named in his honor. When writing about the mutiny of one of Khabarov's lieutenants, yesaul Stepan Vasilyevich Polyakov, who with over a hundred followers refused to obey Khabarov in 1652, Russian and Soviet historians traditionally viewed the mutineers as merely "more anxious to plunder the natives than to fight the Chinese" - the point of view accepted by some Western authors as well.

B.P. Polevoy, who devoted much of his work to the study of Khabarov's Amur raids, and published the "Denunciation Letter" (Izvetnaya gramota) written by the surviving Polyakov mutineers against Khabarov, viewed both Khabarov's role and the mutineers' motives differently. In his 1995 article with which he prefaced Polyakov's "Denunciation Letter", B.P. Polevoy analyzes the reasons for the mutineers' dissatisfaction with Khabarov's actions. Khabarov's wanton killing of the natives who had already submitted to the Russian Czar's authority, and his murder of the wife of the Daurian Prince Shilginey, who was kept as a hostage and would not sleep with him, were antagonizing the local population. His reselling of government supplies to the members of his own band at extortionate prices, often on credit and on usurious conditions, did not foster cohesion in his crew. In Polevoy's view, many of the future mutineers had come to the Amur in the hope to settle somewhere on the fertile lands along its banks as farmers, but Khabarov's abandoning of Albazin, captured by him from the Daurs in 1650, and his strategy of moving quickly up and down the river, collecting "tribute" from the natives to maximize his immediate profit, frustrated the Cossacks' plans for settlement.

Based on his study of Polyakov's "Denunciation Letter", and a number of other documents related to Khabarov's expedition of 1650-1653 and its aftermath, Polevoy called the traditional "veneration" (культ) of Khabarov "quite strange", and opined that if not for Khabarov's "mistakes" (which turned the Daurs and Duchers against the Russians and toward the Manchus, and were not conducive to a sustainable colonization program), the entire course of later events in the region could have been quite different.
