= Dauriya =

Historical geographic region in Russia

Dauriya (Russian: Даурия, also romanized as Dauriia or Dauria) is a historical and geographical region of Russia spanning modern Buryatia, Zabaykalsky Krai and the Amur Region. The toponym refers to the Daur people who inhabited the region until the middle of the 17th century, and to the region which was first explored during the expedition of Enalei Bakhteyarov in 1640.

The informal term "Dauriya" may be expanded to adjacent territories of Mongolia and even parts of China, see, e.g., Daurian forest steppe.

== History ==
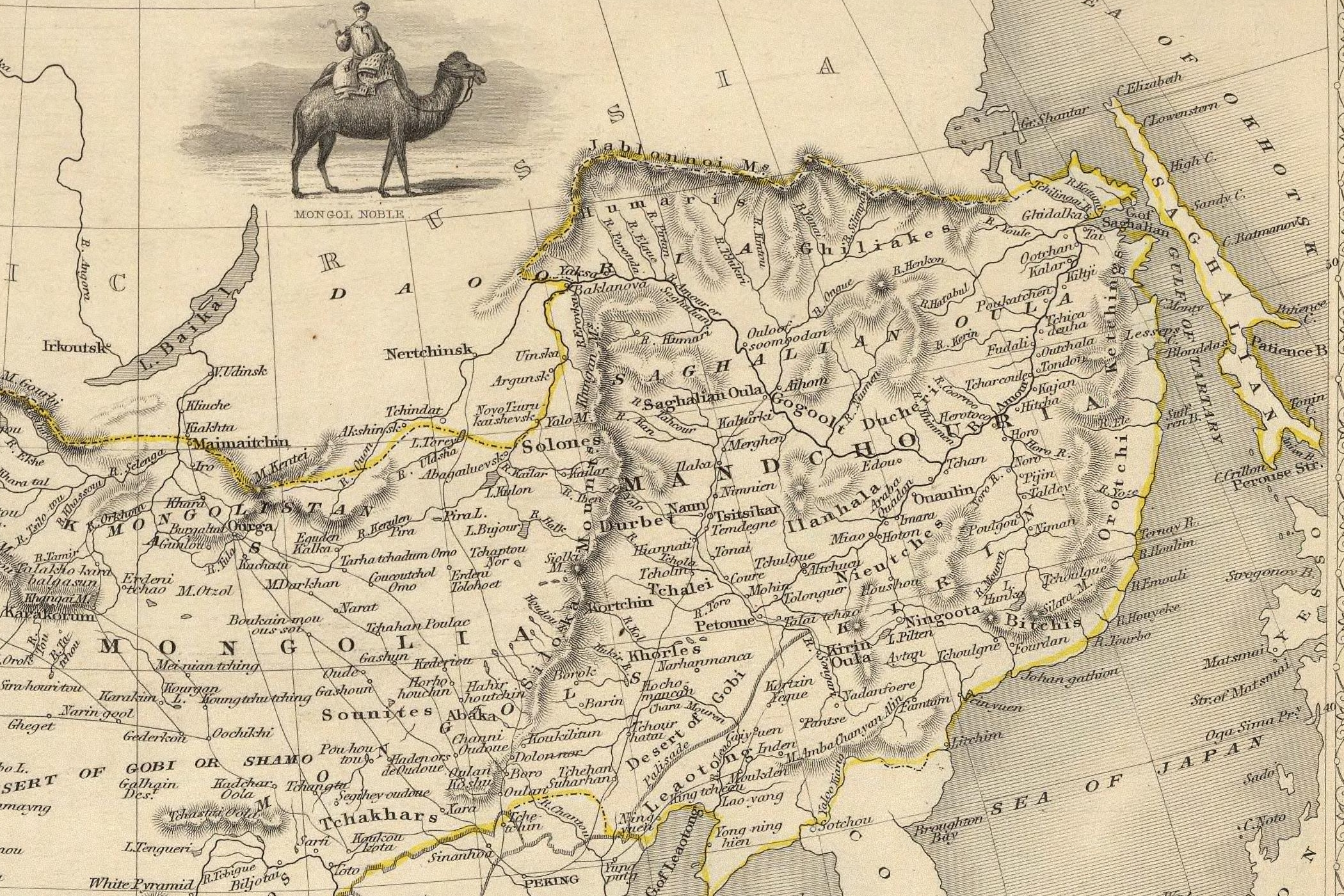
Dauriya (within the Russian and Chinese empires) on the map of 1851

=== Cossack exploration ===
Rumors about the riches of the Daurian land prompted the Yakutia governor Pyotr Golovin to send in 1643 a detachment of 133 Cossacks with a cannon under the command of Vassili Poyarkov. Poyarkov was given ship equipment, canvas, ammunition, muskets, as well as gifts to local residents: copper cauldrons and pans, cloth, beads, etc. The purpose was to collect yasak (tribute) and to search for silver, copper and lead. During the three years of the campaign, accompanied by atrocities towards the local population, Poyarkov collected valuable information about the peoples living along the Amur. The exploration started by Poyarkov was continued by Yerofey Khabarov, whose first expedition to Amur was launched in 1649, by the permission of a new governor, Dmitry Frantsebekov. Having heard about the approach of a new detachment of Cossacks, the Daurs fled from their villages. The Cossacks found abandoned villages with hundreds of houses and large grain reserves. As a result of the campaign of Russian explorers, the entire left bank of the Amur river was deserted: fleeing from the abuse, all Daurs moved to the right bank of the Amur under the protection of the Manchu authorities.

According to the educational book "The Explorer Erofey Khabarov" by Galina Leontyeva, the campaign of Poyarkov's detachment continued with great difficulties and forced wintering at the mouth of the Umlekan river (a Zeya tributary), where 40 members of the detachment died of starvation during the first winter of the campaign, while only 9 servitors died in clashes with local Daurs.

In the spring, a detachment of Cossacks went along the Zeya River; 25 of them were assigned to reconnoiter the passage from Zeya to the sea. Not reaching the sea, the detachment turned back and on the way back was attacked by Duchers. Of the 25 people, only two Cossacks survived. Three years later, Poyarkov's detachment returned to the Yakut fort (Yakut ostrog) with the collected yasak.

== Geography ==
Geographically, Dauriya may be divided into the following parts:

- Baikal Dauriya - the territory from Lake Baikal to the Yablonovy Mountains.
- Vitim-Olyokma Dauriya - the basin of the Vitim and Olyokma rivers (the northern part of the Trans-Baikal Territory, the west of the Amur Region).
- Selenga Dauriya - the basin of the Selenga River (south of Buryatia, south-west of the Trans-Baikal Territory; see Selenga Highlands).
- Nerchinsk Dauriya - territories to the east of the Yablonovy Mountains (southeastern part of the Trans-Baikal Territory).

== See also ==
Several animals and plants have the adjective "Dahurian" or other spellings in their names, see Category:Daurian fauna and flora.
