= Bahai (Qing dynasty) =

Third Class adaha hafan Bahai

General of Ningguta
- In office 1662–1683
- Succeeded by: Intu

Personal details
- Died: 1696
- Parent: Šarhūda (father)

Military service
- Allegiance: Qing dynasty
- Branch/service: Manchu Bordered Blue Banner
- Battles/wars: Sino-Russian border conflicts

Bahai (Manchu:ᠪᠠᡥᠠᡳ, Mölendroff: bahai; Chinese: 巴海, died 1696) was a Manchu military commander during the early Qing dynasty.

He was the eldest son of Šarhūda of the Gūwalgiya clan, which belonged to the Manchu Bordered Blue Banner. Beginning as a captain, he was appointed in 1657 a reader in the Bishu yüan (秘書院). In 1659 he succeeded his father who died in that year and was made a commander of the garrison troops at Ninguta. At the same time he inherited his father's rank of baron (男) of the first class. In 1660 he reported a complete victory over the Russian troops under Afanasy Pashkov (d. 1664, founded Nerchinsk in 1658) at the village of Gufatan (古法檀) which was in the Shilka River region. In 1661, upon the discovery that Bahai had purposely omitted troop losses in this battle in his reports, he was deprived of his hereditary rank of baron. Nonetheless in 1662 he was appointed the first military-governor of Ninguta. In 1673, he was rewarded for his success in organizing a tribe of natives called the Meljere into 40 companies known as the New Manchus (新滿洲), as a result he was given a minor hereditary rank five years later. In 1676 he removed his headquarters to a city west of Ninguta, called Kirin, and from 1682–83 took part in the preparations for attacking the Russians at Albazin. He was deprived of all offices in 1683 after he falsely reported a famine that did not exist. But from 1684 to 1696 he served in Peking as a lieutenant-general in the Mongol Bordered Blue Banner.

== See also ==
- Russian–Manchu border conflicts
