= Aigun =

Coordinates: 49.978°N 127.490°E

Aigun 瑷珲 Aihui
- Town

Manchu transcription(s)
  - Manchu: ᠠᡳ᠌ᡥᡡᠨ
  - Transliteration: aihūn

Chinese transcription(s)
  - Traditional: 璦琿
  - Simplified: 瑷珲
  - Pinyin: Ài Huī
- Interactive map of Aigun
- Country: China
- Province: Heilongjiang
- Prefecture: Heihe
- Time zone: UTC+8 (China Standard Time)

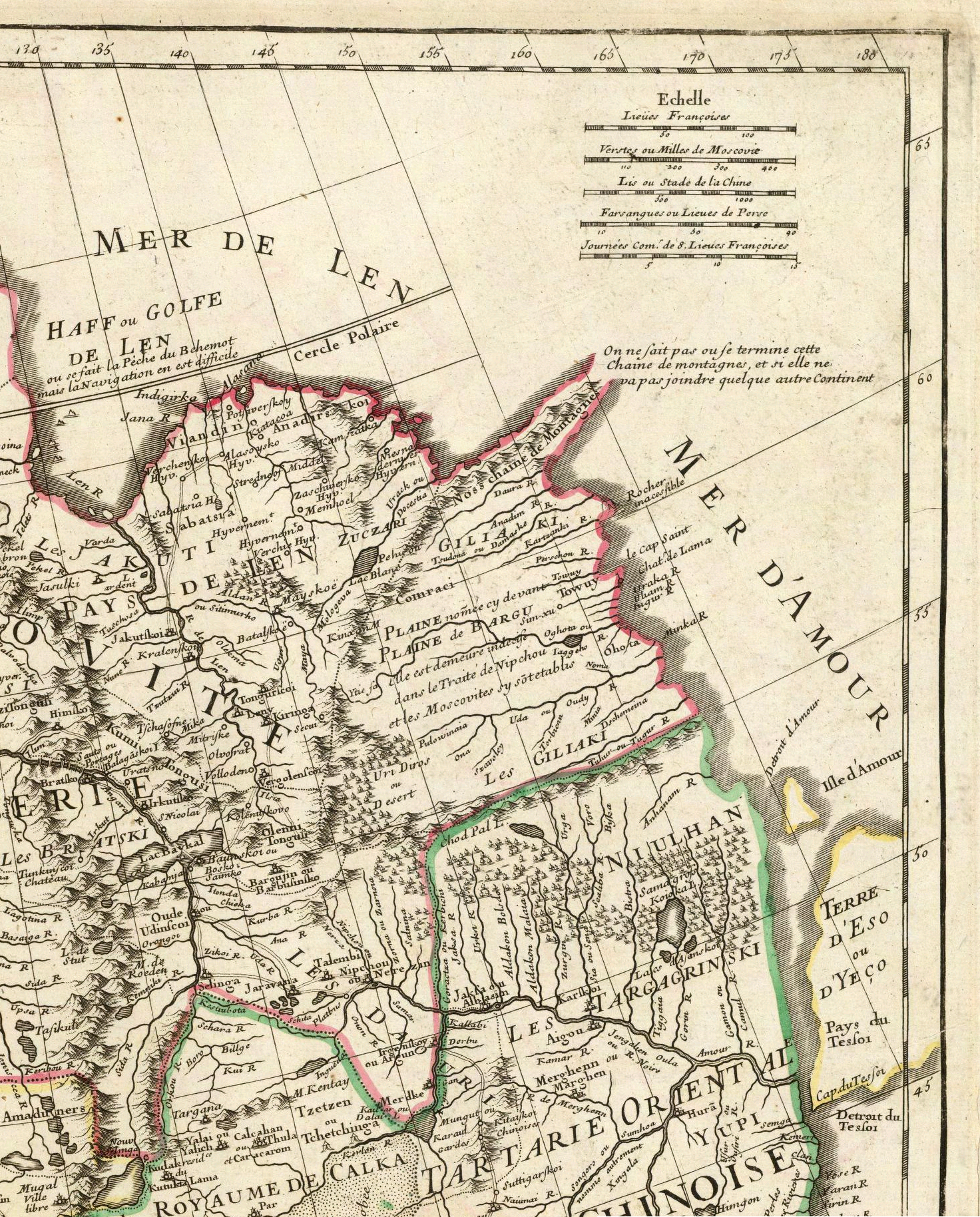
Aigou (Aigun) shown as one of the few towns on the Amur, and one of the most important places in the region, on a 1706 French map

Aigun (simplified Chinese: 瑷珲; traditional Chinese: 璦琿; pinyin: Ài Hún; Manchu: ᠠᡳ᠌ᡥᡡᠨ aihūn; Russian: Айгунь, romanized: Aigun) was a historic Chinese town in northern Manchuria, situated on the right bank of the Amur River, some 30 kilometres (19 mi) south (downstream) from the central urban area of Heihe (which is across the Amur from the mouth of the Zeya River and Blagoveschensk).

The Chinese name of the town, which literally means "Bright Jade", was a transliteration of the Manchu (or Ducher) name of the town. The current Mainland Chinese pronunciation Ài Huī does not reflect this, unlike the Taiwanese pronunciation which still follows the Old National Pronunciation Ài Hún.

Today the former city of Aigun is called Aihui Town (ᠠᡳ᠌ᡥᡡᠨ
ᡥᠣᡨᠣᠨ aihūn hoton) and is part of Aihui District, which in turn is part of the prefecture-level city of Heihe. Heihe is one of the major cities in Heilongjiang Province.

== History ==
The predecessor of Aigun was a town of the indigenous Ducher people of the Amur Valley, located on the left (northeastern – now Russian) bank of the Amur River. The site of this town, whose name was reported by the Russian explorer Yerofey Khabarov as Aytyun (Айтюн) in 1652, is currently known to archaeologists as the Grodekovo site (Гродековское городище), after the nearby village of Grodekovo. It is thought to have been populated since around the end of the 1st or the beginning of the 2nd millennium AD.

Some sources report a Chinese presence on the middle Amur – a fort existed at Aigun for about 20 years during the Yongle era on the left (northwestern) shore of the Amur downstream from the mouth of the Zeya River. This Ming Dynasty Aigun was located on the opposite bank to the later Aigun that was relocated during the Qing Dynasty.

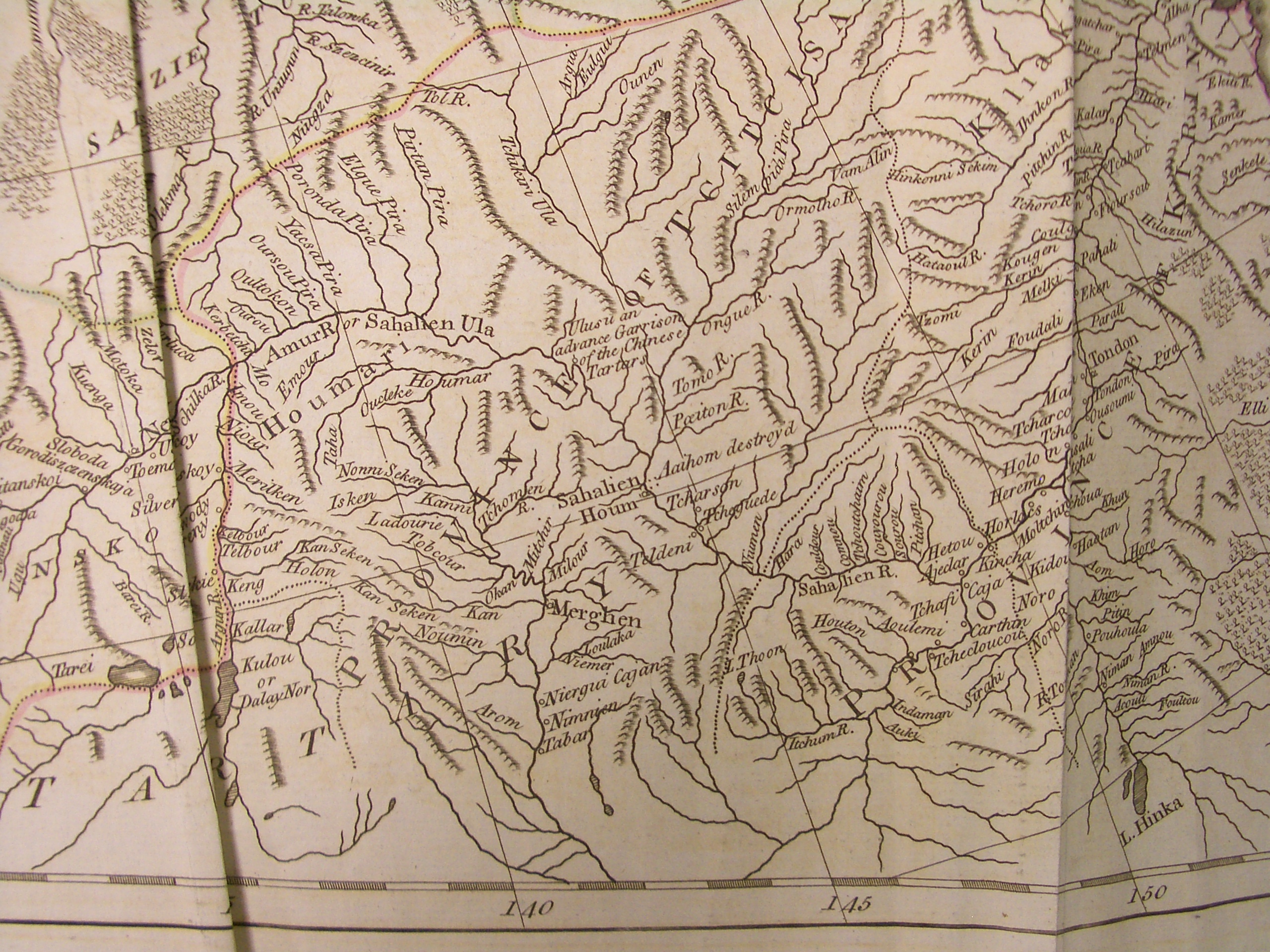
Aaihom (destroyed) shown on the 1773 map opposite Sahalien Hotun, following d'Anville's map from 1734

The Ducher town was probably vacated when the Duchers were evacuated by the Manchu Chinese Qing Dynasty to the Sungari or Hurka in the mid-1650s. In 1683–85 the Manchus re-used the site as a base for their campaign against the Russian fort of Albazin.

After the capture of Albazin in 1685 or 1686, the Manchus relocated the town to a new site on the right (southwestern) bank of the Amur, about 3 miles (4.8 km) downstream from the original site. The new site occupied the location of the former village of a Daurian chief named Tolga. The city became known primarily under its Manchu name Saghalien Ula Hotun or Hoton (Manchu: ᠰᠠᡥᠠᠯᡳᠶᠠᠨ
ᡠᠯᠠ
ᡥᠣᡨᠣᠨ Sahaliyan Ula Hoton), and sometimes also under the Chinese translation of this name, Heilongjiang Cheng (黑龍江城). Both names mean "Black River City", but by the 19th century the name "Aigun" again became more current in the western languages.

For a number of years after 1683, Aigun served as the capital (the seat of the Military Governor) of Heilongjiang Province, until the capital was moved to Nenjiang (Mergen) in 1690, and later to Qiqihar. Aigun, however, remained the seat of the Deputy Lieutenant-General (Fu dutong), responsible for a large district covering much of the Amur Valley within the province of Heilongjiang as it existed in those days.

As a part of a nationwide Sino-French cartographic program, Aigun (or, rather, Saghalien Ula hoton) was visited ca. 1709 by the Jesuits Jean-Baptiste Régis, Pierre Jartoux, and Xavier Ehrenbert Fridelli, who found it a well-defended town, serving as the base of a Manchu river fleet controlling the Amur River region. Surrounded by numerous villages on the fertile riverside plain, the town was well provisioned with foodstuffs.

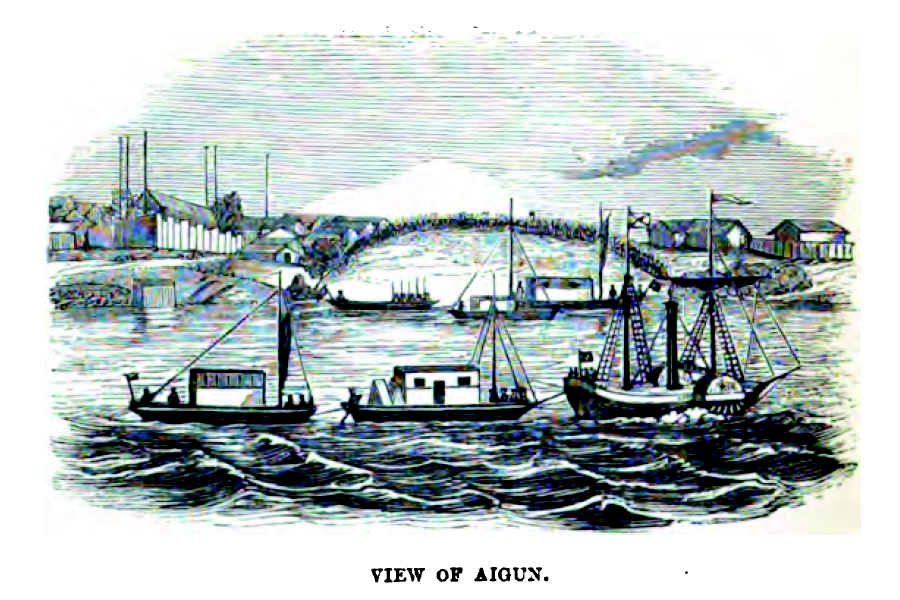
Muravyov's fleet off Aigun in 1854

It was at Aigun in May 1858 that Nikolay Muravyov concluded the Aigun Treaty, according to which the left bank of the Amur River was conceded to Russia.

During the Boxer Rebellion of 1900, for a few weeks Aigun was the center of military action directed against the Russians. On July 22, Aigun was captured by Russian troops.

In 1913 Aigun became the county seat of the newly created Aigun County (瑷珲县, Àihuī Xiàn), which was renamed Aihui County (爱辉县, Àihuī Xiàn, the pronunciation remained unchanged) in December 1956.

The Manchus of the Chinese capital Peking (now known as Beijing) were influenced by the Chinese dialect spoken in the area to the point where pronouncing Manchu sounds was hard for them, and they pronounced Manchu according to Chinese phonetics, while in contrast, the Manchus of Aigun could both pronounce Manchu sounds properly and mimick the sinicised pronunciation of Peking Manchus, since they learned the Pekinese pronunciation from either studying in Peking or from officials sent to Aigun from the capital, and they could tell them apart, using the Chinese influenced Pekinese pronunciation when demonstrating that they were better educated or their superior stature in society.

On November 15, 1980, Heihe City was created, and on June 6, 1983, Aihui County was abolished and merged into the Heihe City.

== Commemoration ==
There are a number of historical sites in today's Aihui Town (30 km south of downtown Heihe) related to the historical Aigun. They include Aihui Ancient City (瑷珲古城), Aihui Heroic Defenders' of the Fatherland Garden (瑷珲卫国英雄园, Àihuī Wèiguó Yīngxióng Yuán), and Aihui History Museum (瑷珲历史陈列馆, Àihuī Lìshǐ Chénliè Guǎn).
