= Tangni Kingdom =

Proto-Korean kingdom

Korean name
- Hangul: 탁리국
- Hanja: 橐離國
- RR: Tangniguk
- MR: T'angniguk

Alternate name
- Hangul: 고리국
- Hanja: 槀離國
- RR: Goriguk
- MR: Koriguk

Tangni Kingdom (Korean: 탁리국; Hanja: 橐離國) or Gori Kingdom (고리국; 槀離國) was a proto-Korean kingdom where King Dongmyeong, who was the founder of Buyeo, was born.

It is said that Gori Kingdom was located in the north of Buyeo.

Naitō Torajirō pointed out that the Gori Kingdom (where King Dongmyeong, a founder of Buyeo was born) was a country of Daur people who lived by Songhua River.

== History ==
Gori Kingdom is described in different way by different historical documents. The oldest record of King Dongmyeong, a founder of Buyeo, is in Lunheng of Wang Chong in the Eastern Han dynasty.

In Lunheng, Vol 2, Chapter Jiyan (Hanja: 吉験), there's a description of Tangni Kingdom.

In Records of the Three Kingdoms, Vol30, Chapter 30 of Book of Wei, Biographics of Wuhuan, Xianbei, and Dongyi, Weilue, there's a description of Gori Kingdom.

== Outline ==
In Records of the Three Kingdoms, Vol30, Chapter 30 of Book of Wei, Biographics of Wuhuan, Xianbei, and Dongyi, Weilue, there's following descriptions.

昔北方有高離之國者，其王者侍婢有身，王欲殺之，婢云：「有氣如雞子來下，我故有身。」後生子，王捐之於溷中，豬以喙噓之，徙至馬閑，馬以氣噓之，不死。王疑以爲天子也，乃令其母收畜之，名曰東明，常令牧馬。東明善射，王恐奪其國也，欲殺之。東明走，南至施掩水，以弓擊水，魚鱉浮爲橋，東明得度，魚鱉乃解散，追兵不得渡。東明因都王夫餘之地。

Once upon a time, in country of Gori of Beiyi (Hanja: 北夷), the king tried to kill the maid because she gets pregnant. The maid said “The mystique like chicken egg in the sky had come down and I got pregnant.” and the king was deceived. After that, she gave birth to a boy. The king commanded her to leave a boy in a pigsty, but a boy did not die because pigs blow on him. Then the king moved a boy to a horse barn, but a boy did not die because horses blow on him. The king thought that was a work of God, took him back to mother’s place, make her to raise him up, and name a boy as Tong Myŏng. When Tong Myŏng get older, he became skillful to ride a horse and shoot a bow and also had violent personality, the king afraid of Tong Myŏng to take his country over, and tried to kill him again. Dong Myeong run away from the country, run to south, reached to Si Ŏmsu (시엄수; 施掩水). Once he shoots a bow to surface of the water, fishes turtles came up and gave him a ride. Then he reached to the land of Buyeo and became a king there.

— Records of the Three Kingdoms, Vol30
