= Minggadari =

Qing dynasty general (d. 1669)

Minggadari, or Minggandari (simplified Chinese: 明安达礼; traditional Chinese: 明安達禮; pinyin: Míngāndálǐ; Manchu: ᠮᡳᠩᡤᠠᠨ᠋ᡩ᠋ᠠᡵᡳ; d. 1669), was a Mongol general of the Qing dynasty during the reign of the Kangxi Emperor.

== Biography ==
Minggadari was a member of the Mongol Sirut clan, and his father Bobotu (d. 1627) held the position of company captain in the Mongol White Banner of the Qing dynasty.

After his father's death, Minggadari inherited his position. In 1638, he joined an expedition led by Manchu commander Yoto that crossed the Great Wall into southern Zhili. He also participated in another invasion in 1642 under the command of Abatai In 1644, when the Qing army captured Beijing, Minggadari was assigned to pursue the Chinese commander and anti-Ming rebel Li Zicheng. He successfully completed this mission and was promoted to vice minister of war in 1646.

He was then tasked with suppressing the uprising of the Sunid Mongol tribe, which he accomplished in 1648. Upon his return, he was appointed commander of the Mongol White Banner. In 1650, he became minister of war and in 1652, he was appointed as a member of the Council of Princes and High Officials, holding the title of second-rank viscount. In 1653, he lost his ministerial post.

He was then sent to Ninguta and in the spring of 1655, he led an unsuccessful siege against the Russian Cossacks at Kumarsk on the Amur. Despite this, he was appointed as minister of dependent states in 1656. In 1659, he was sent to campaign against Zheng Chenggong. He returned to Court of Colonial Affairs in 1660 and the following year, he once again became minister of war. He held this position for six years until he resigned in 1667.

Minggadari died two years later. In recognition of his service to the Qing, the Kangxi Emperor granted him the posthumous name Minguo (Chinese: 敏果; pinyin: Mǐnguǒ).
