= Shin Ryu =

Korean general (1619–1680)

- Hangul: 신류
- Hanja: 申瀏
- RR: Sin Ryu
- MR: Sin Ryu

Shin Ryu (Korean: 신류; Hanja: 申瀏; 1619–1680) was a general of the Joseon period.

== Biography ==
He was born into a yangban family of the Pyeongsan Shin lineage in modern-day Chilgok County, North Gyeongsang Province, near where his shrine now stands in Yangmok-myeon. He passed the military gwageo in 1645, and went on to hold various state positions. In 1654, he was appointed commander (첨사; 僉使; ch'ŏmsa) of Hyesan in Joseon's northern border province of North Hamgyong Province. In 1657, he was appointed as the right army inspector (병마우후; 兵馬虞候; pyŏngmauhu) of North Hamgyong Province.

=== 1658 expedition ===
Shin is best remembered today for his role in Joseon's 1658 expedition against Russian forces led by Onufriy Stepanov in Manchuria. His diary of this expedition, in which roughly 200 Joseon forces from North Hamgyong Province armed with matchlocks joined with a smaller number of Qing forces commanded by Šarhūda to repel the Russian expedition, is one of only two the "Diary of the northern expedition" (북정일기; 北征日記). His forces successfully repelled Russian expedition forces led by Onufriy Stepanov and Russian expedition forces recorded 270 deaths, including Onufriy Stepanov. A modern edition was published in 1980. A Russian translation of his account is available as well; according to the Russian translator and the author of the comments, a particular significance of this document is that it represents the first ever written account about an encounter between Koreans and Russians.

== See also ==
- Military history of Korea
- Manchus-Cossacks wars
- History of Korea
