= Šarhūda =

First Class ashan-i hafan Šarhūda
- Born: 1599
- Died: 1659 (aged 59–60)
- Military career
- Allegiance: Qing Dynasty
- Branch: Manchu Bordered Blue Banner
- Conflicts: Manchu conquest of China; Qing invasion of Joseon; Sino-Russian border conflicts

Šarhūda (Manchu:ᡧᠠᡵᡥᡥᡡᡩᠠ, Mölendroff: šarhūda), known also under the Chinese transcription of his name, Shaerhuda (simplified Chinese: 沙尔虎达; traditional Chinese: 沙爾虎達; 1599–1659), was an ethnic Manchu military commander during the early Qing dynasty, active both before and after the Qing conquest of China proper.

Sarhuda was a member of the Guwalgiya clan of the Suwan (蘇完) Manchu tribe living in the Hurka River Valley. Along with his father he joined Nurhaci-led Manchu forces; they were assigned to the Manchu Bordered Blue Banner. Sarhuda fought both in the Manchus' campaigns against the Ming and in the operations to expand the Manchu control over the native tribes of what today is Heilongjiang Province.

When the Manchus led by Dorgon crossed the Great Wall of China in 1644, Sarhuda commanded the vanguard division, which entered Beijing and later pursued the ousted usurper Li Zicheng to Dongguan, Shaanxi. Later on, he fought against the loyalist Ming forces in the provinces of Jiangsu, Zhejiang, Shandong and Jiangxi. In recognition of his services, he was promoted the position of deputy lieutenant-general of the Manchu Bordered Blue Banner, and granted the hereditary rank of baron (男) of the first class.

In February 1652 Sarhuda was appointed the commander of the troops of the newly created garrison at Ninguta, which was at the time the main Manchu garrison not just in the Hurka Valley, but in all of Manchuria north of the Willow Palisade. In June 1653, he was promoted to the rank of lieutenant-general (昂邦章京, Angbang-zhangjing; Manchu: amban-jianggin) of Ninguta.

In 1658 Sarhuda conducted a campaign against the Russian Cossacks led by Onufriy Stepanov, who had been extracting tribute from the natives of the middle Amur valley. Sarhuda's fleet of some 40 (or 45) boats, manned by Manchu soldiers and a Korean contingent led by General Shin Ryu, totaling about 1400 people, descended the Hurka and the Sungari, and on the 10th day of the 6th month of the Chinese calendar (i.e., some time in July) encountered Onufriy Stepanov's 11-boat fleet with over 400 Cossacks aboard near the fall of Sungari into the Amur. The Russian ships retreated some 30 li down the Amur, when the artillery battle between the two fleets began.

Sarhuda's and Shin Ryu's Manchu-Korean force killed Stepanov and destroyed most of his force; out of 11 Russian ships, 7 was burned, 3 captured by the Manchu-Korean force, and 1, although it was initially captured, was recaptured by some Russian survivors of the battle, who used it to get away. Ten Russians were taken prisoners, and around a hundred Ducher women, which had been kept by the Cossacks aboard their ships, were released. The Manchus also captured over 300 flintlock small arms. Despite the Koreans' requests to share the captured weapons (which were a novelty in this region at the time) with them, Sarhuda did not give them any.

This victory was said to have cleared the Amur Valley from major Russian presence until 1669, when the Russians built Albazin much farther upstream (and much closer to their bases in the Transbaikalia).

Sarhuda died the following year (1659), and was canonised as Xiangzhuang (襄壯). Sarhuda's son, Bahai (巴海), inherited his father's rank and replaced him as the commander of the Ninguta garrison; he also campaigned against the Russians.

== See also ==
- Russian–Manchu border conflicts
