= Duchers =

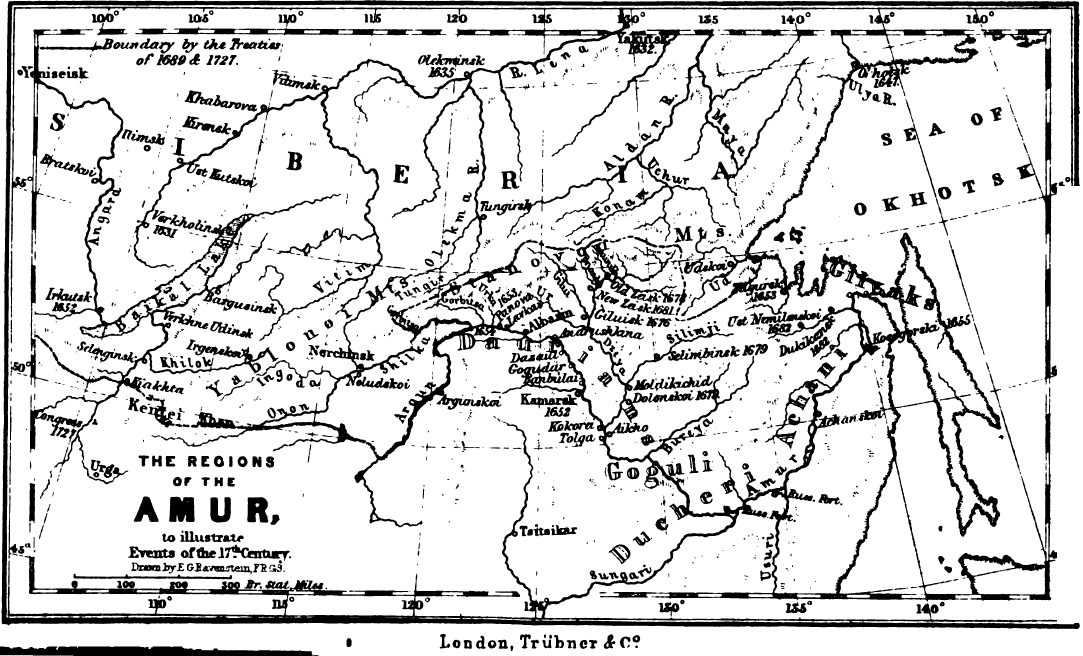
The lands of the Dauri, Ducheri, and Goguli in the mid-17th century, according to Ernst Georg Ravenstein

The Duchers (Russian: дючеры or дучеры) was the Russian name of the people populating the shores of the middle course of the Amur River, approximately from the mouth of the Zeya down to the mouth of the Ussuri, and possibly even somewhat further downstream. Their ethnic identity is not known with certainty, but it is usually assumed that they were a Tungusic people, related to the Jurchens and/or the Nanais.

The name of this ethnic group is sometimes also written in English as "Jucher".

== Life of the Duchers ==
The total number of Duchers (including other related Manchu groups, but not the Daurs or Evenks) of the Amur Valley at the time of the appearance of the Russian explorers in the region ca. 1650 has been estimated by modern scholars at 14,000.

According to the Russian explorers of the time, the Duchers, as well as the related groups, the Goguls, and their north-western neighbors, the Daurs, were agriculturalists. They grew rye, wheat, barley, millet, oats, peas, and hemp, as well as a number of vegetables. The Duchers had horses and cattle; pigs were a particularly important source of meat. They did some hunting and fishing as well.

According to the 17th-century Cossacks' reports, the Duchers lived in fortified villages (Russian: городок) with 60 and more houses in each.

The predecessor of the Qing fortress Aigun (which was originally located on the left - now Russian - bank of the Amur, opposite to its later location) was a Ducher town, currently known to the archaeologists as the Grodekovo site (Гродековское городище), after the nearby village of Grodekovo. It is located south of the city of Blagoveshchensk and the fall of the Zeya into the Amur. Yerofey Khabarov reported the existence of this town (which he called Aytyun (Айтюн)) to the Yakutsk voivode D. Frantsbekov in 1652. According to the archaeologists, this fortress was first built around the end of the first or beginning of the second millennium CE.

The "tribute" of furs, grain, and livestock, collected (or looted, as the case may be) by the Cossacks from the Daurs and the Duchers was the main economic benefit derived by the Russians from their expansion in the region in the early 1650s, and, in order to deny it to them, the Qing government starting in 1654 resettled the Ducher farmers from the Amur valley to the Sungari and Hurka Rivers further south. The Daurs were resettled (to the Nenjiang River Valley) as well. When Onufriy Stepanov visited the lower Sungari in 1656, he found the Ducher villages deserted.

== Ethnic identity ==
The ethnic identification of the Duchers and even the meaning of their name (and whether it was also a self-name) remain controversial.

Archaeologically, the Ducher culture can be identified since the second half of the 13th century (i.e., soon after the destruction of the Jurchen Jin Empire by the Mongols), being a successor of the earlier culture of the Amur Jurchens.

According to the Great Soviet Encyclopedia, today's Nanai, Ulch, and other Tungusic people of the middle and lower Amur valley have incorporated descendants of the Duchers. The Russian scholar B.P. Polevoy goes even further, identifying the Duchers (at least, the ones from the Sungari / Ussuri mouth area) with the Nanais.

Another, and probably more common, view, expressed e.g. by the Russian archaeologist D.P. Bolotin or Tungusologist A.A. Burykin is that the Duchers were part of the Jurchens. This would imply that after being resettled to the Sungari and the Hurka they simply merged into the Manchu people.

The etymology of the word "Duchers" (which, besides дючеры and дучеры, had a number of other spelling variants in the 17th-century Russian manuscripts: чючар, джучар, жучер, дючан) is controversial as well. Some researches hold it obvious that it is related to Jurchens' self-name, jušen. Another view, expressed by A.A. Burykin, is that Russian "дючер" (Dyucher) may have come from Manchu zuche, zuchen, meaning "guards along the river".
