= Ning'an =

Ning'an 宁安市
- County-level city
- Riverside Park Ningguta Stele apartment buildings East Avenue Wangjiang Tower Shangjing Longquanfu Sabusu Plaza Mudan River and Gongnongbing Bridge

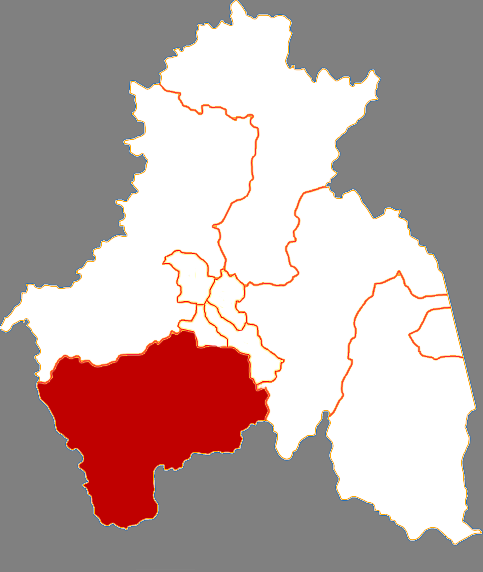

- Location in Heilongjiang Location in China
- Coordinates: 44°20′36″N 129°27′42″E
- Country: People's Republic of China
- Province: Heilongjiang
- Prefecture-level city: Mudanjiang

Area
  - Total: 7,870 km^{2} (3,040 sq mi)

Population (2003)
  - Total: 440,000
  - Density: 56/km^{2} (140/sq mi)
- Time zone: UTC+8 (China Standard)
- Postal code: 157400
- Area code: 0453
- Climate: Dwb
- Website: www.ningan.gov.cn

Ning'an (Chinese: 宁安; pinyin: Níng'ān; Manchu: ᠨᡳᠩᡤᡠᡨᠠ, romanized: Ningguta) is a city located approximately 20 km (12 mi) southwest of Mudanjiang, in the southeast of Heilongjiang province, China, bordering Jilin province to the south. It is located on the Mudanjiang River (formerly known as Hurka River), which flows north, eventually falling into the Sungari River near Sanxing.

Administratively, Ning'an is now a county-level city, and a constituent part of the prefecture-level city of Mudanjiang.

The land area of the entire county-level city of Ning'an is 7,870 km^{2} (3,040 sq mi); the reported population count, as of 2004, stood at 440,000. The government of the "county-level city" is located in the town of the same name (宁安镇; Níng'ān zhèn).

Notable geographic features of the county-level city of Ning'an include Lake Jingpo and a crater underground forest (火山口地下森林). Lake Jingpo is a natural reservoir on the Mudanjiang River upstream (about 40 km or 25 mi southwest, straight-line distance) from Ning'an central urban area, result of the volcanic eruptions about 10,000 years ago.

== History ==
=== Balhae ===
Shangjing Longquanfu, one of the capitals of the Balhae kingdom (between 756 and 785, and between 793 and 926), was located within today's county-level city of Ning'an. Its site was near today's small towns of Dongjingcheng (东京城镇; Dōngjīngchéng zhèn) and Bohai (渤海镇; Bóhǎi zhèn; 44.109°N 129.215°E), about 25 km (16 mi) upstream (southwest) from the Ning'an main urban area.

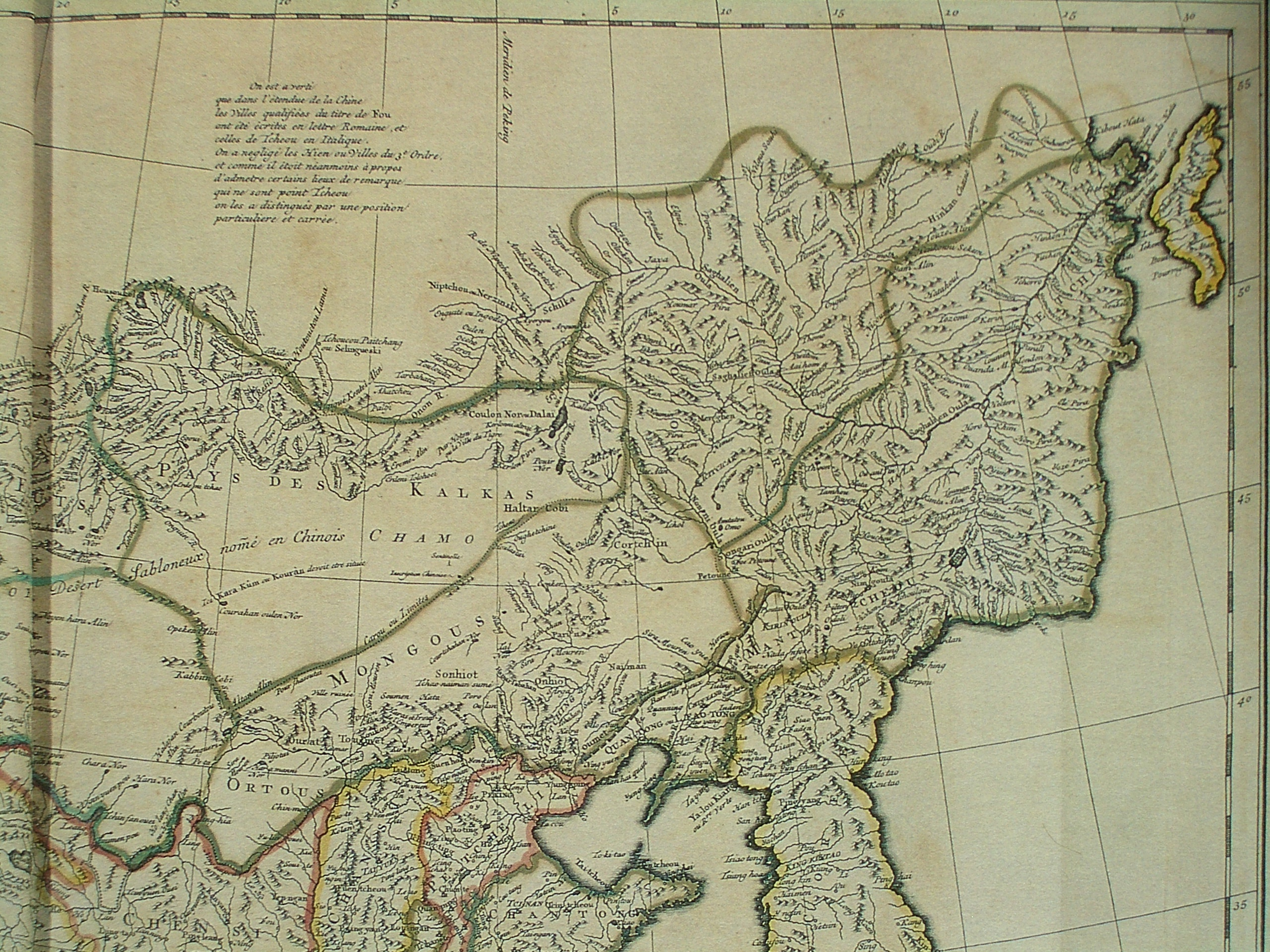
Northeastern part of the map of China and Chinese Tartary (1735; based on the expedition of 1709), with Ningguta shown within Jilin Province

=== Qing dynasty ===
During the early Qing dynasty, the town of Ning'an, known then under the Manchu name ᠨᡳᠩᡤᡠᡨᠠNingguta (transcribed into Chinese as 宁古塔, Ningguta), was one of the most important towns in the entire Manchuria beyond the "Willow Palisade". The name "Ningguta" literally means "six" in Manchu language because it was once guarded by six grandsons of Möngke Temür (猛哥帖木儿).

The Hurka River valley, where Ningguta was located, was the traditional homeland of the Jianzhou Jurchens (who later started calling themselves Manchus), Ningguta and Sanxing being the two oldest centers of the incipient Manchu state. After the Manchus conquered all of China in 1644, the Ningguta area continued to be considered by the Qing dynasty ruling family as the place of its origin.

Already in 1652 the Qing government sent 2000 horsemen, armed with bows, matchlock firearms, and iron cannons, commanded by Sarhuda to set a garrison at Ningguta, which was the first Qing garrison beyond the Willow Palisade.

In June 1653 Sarhuda's position became styled "military deputy-lieutenant governor" (昂邦章京, or amban-jianggin in Manchu) and a deputy lieutenant general (副都統; fù dūtǒng) were appointed to command the Ningguta garrison.

The suitability of Ningguta as an administrative center was in part due to its location on the Hurka River (or, for the original site, on the Hurka's tributary Hailang), which provided a convenient transportation route connecting Ningguta with the lower Sungari and the lower Amur River. Early on, a great dockyard operated in Ningguta, building boats for the Mudanjiang/Sungari/Amur river system, although it was later relocated to Jilin City.

In 1658 Sarhuda, in charge of a Manchu fleet of several dozen ships, and including also General Shin Ryu's Korean force, sailed from Ningguta down the Hurka and the Sungari, to defeat the smaller fleet of the Russian Cossack Onufriy Stepanov near the fall of the Sungari into the Amur.

After the death of Sarhuda in 1659, his son Bahai (巴海) was appointed to occupy Sarhuda's position.

In 1662, the title of the military deputy-lieutenant governor (amban-jianggin) position was changed to the Ningguta Military Governor (鎮守寧古塔等處將軍; zhènshǒu nínggǔtǎ děngchǔ jiāngjūn), Bahai being the first occupant of this post, while the office of the deputy lieutenant general was relocated to Jilin City.

The early location of the Ningguta fortress was not at today's Ning'an, but some 50 km (31 mi) to the northwest, on the Hailang River (a tributary of the Mudanjiang River). That site is located near the present-day Gucheng village (古城村), part of the small town of Changting (长汀镇; 44.48°N 128.92°E). That site is not within the modern county-level city of Ning'an, but in the neighboring county-level city of Hailin.

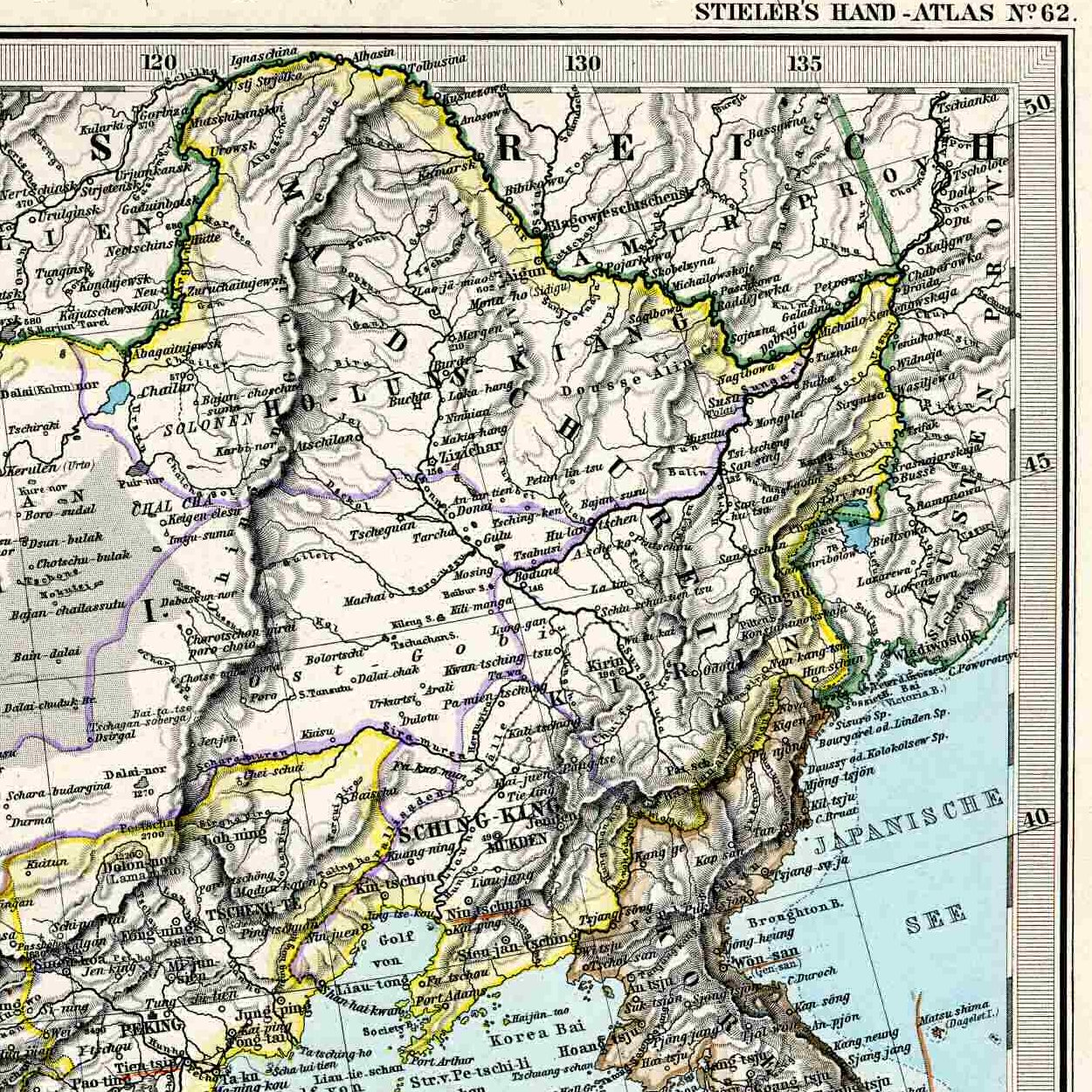
In 1891, just a few years before the beginning of the construction of the Chinese Eastern Railway and the rise of Mudanjiang, Ningguta still remained one of the most important cities of Manchuria. In Jilin Province as it existed at the time, it was second only to Jilin City

Growth of the more conveniently located Jilin City resulted in the decrease of the relative importance of Ningguta. Still, Ningguta was the main seat of government of the eastern half of the beyond-the-palisade Manchuria until 1676, when the Military Governor (jiangjun) moved from Ningguta to Jilin City (then called Jilin Ula Cheng, i.e. Jilin River City), and the Deputy Lieutenant-General (副都統; fù dūtǒng) was transferred in the opposite direction (from Jilin City to Ningguta).

Although now lower-ranked than Jilin City, Ningguta retained its importance into the 18th and 19th century as one of the few cities existing beyond the Willow Palisade. The Deputy Lieutenant-General stationed there was the top government official for the entire region stretching east to the Sea of Japan and populated primarily by a variety of Tungusic peoples, such as the Nanais.

According to the evidence of the Jesuits who visited the area in 1709 along with a government-sponsored ginseng-harvesting expedition, by the early 18th century Ningguta had become an important center of trade in local forest products, namely ginseng harvested in the region and sable pelts, collected as tax from the Nanai natives. Therefore, besides the Manchu garrison and the officials, Ningguta was home to numerous Han Chinese civilians, some of whom had come to Ningguta from faraway provinces in order to participate in the profitable commerce. There were already numerous peasant villages around the town, some at quite a distance from it, populated both by Manchus and by Han Chinese exiled to this area for various offenses against the law. (Convicts started being sent to Ningguta area as early as 1660; anti-Qing rebels, captured in southern China, followed in 1661) A variety of cereal crops, such as millet and oats were grown there.

In May 1910, the area was re-organized as Ning'an Fu.

=== Republic of China ===
Following the fall of the Qing dynasty, Ning'an underwent a series of administrative changes. In March 1913, Ning'an Fu was re-organized as Ning'an County (simplified Chinese: 宁安县; traditional Chinese: 寧安縣; pinyin: Níng'ān Xiàn). In June 1914, Ning'an County was placed under the jurisdiction of Yanji Circuit in Jilin province.

In February 1929, circuits were abolished, and Ning'an was administered directly by the province. At this time, Ning'an had a population of more than 170,000.

=== Japanese occupation ===
Upon the formation of the puppet state of Manchukuo, Ning'an remained within Jilin province until December 1934, when it became part of the newly formed Binjiang province. In July 1937, it was placed under Mudanjiang province.

=== After occupation ===
In April 1946, the area was placed under the jurisdiction of Suining province, but this was changed to the newly formed Mudanjiang province. In July 1948, the area was once again adjusted, this time falling under the jurisdiction of Songjiang province. In August 1954, Songjiang province was abolished and merged into Heilongjiang province. In March 1956, Ning'an, still a county, was placed under the then-prefecture of Mudanjiang. From 1956 to 1962, Ning'an's borders were changed multiple times, until finally reaching their current iteration.

In 1993, Ning'an was upgraded from a county to a county-level city.

== Geography ==
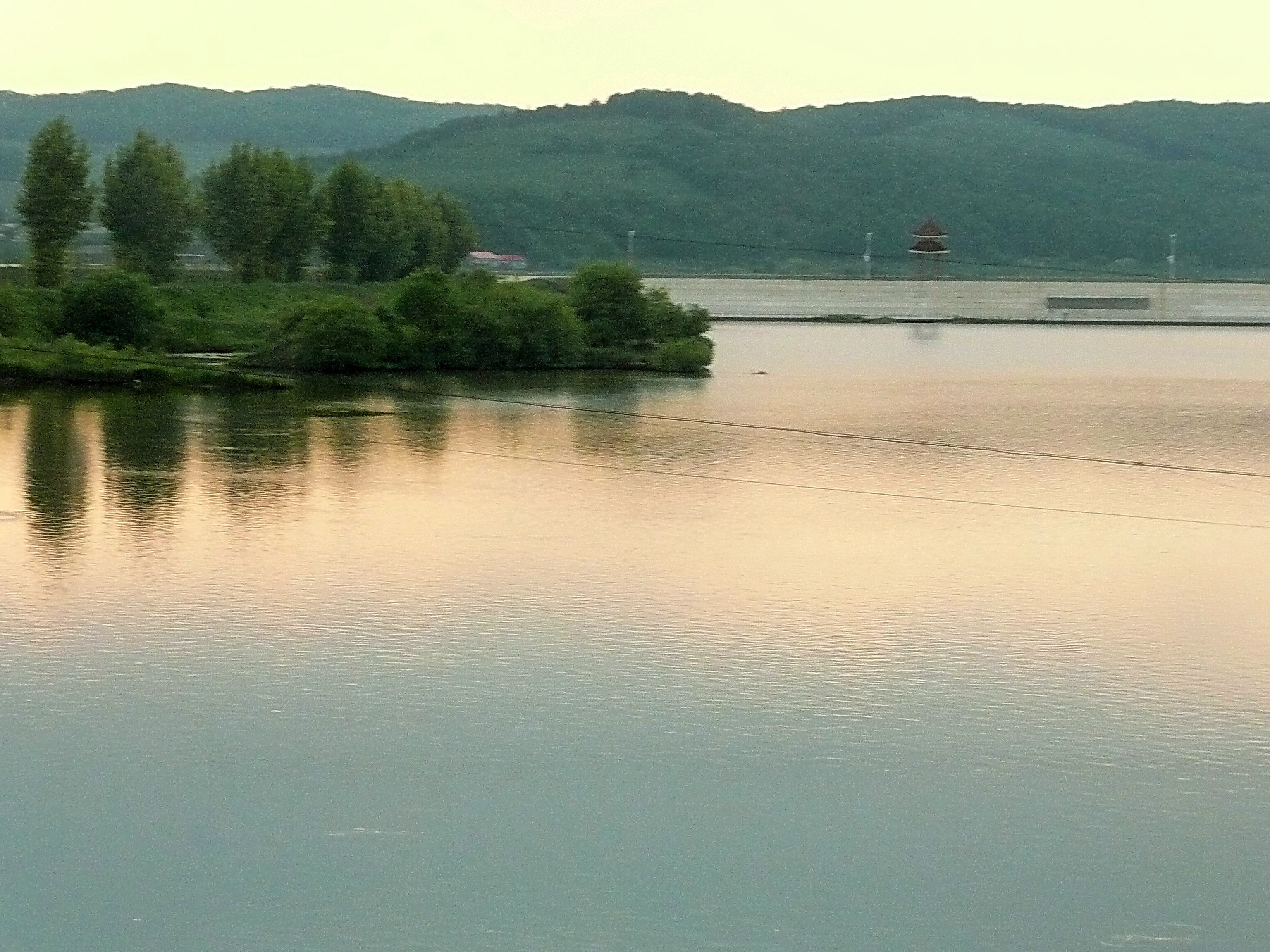
The Mudan River

Ning'an is located in the southeast of Heilongjiang province, on the shores of Jingpo Lake and Mudan River. The terrain is largely hilly, and the Changbai Mountains run through the city.

Ning'an is bordered by Muling to the east, Hailin to the west, Wangqing County and Dunhua of Jilin province to the south, and Mudanjiang's urban core to the north. Ning'an is approximately 23 kilometres (14 mi) away from Mudanjiang's urban core, 190 kilometres (120 mi) away from both Suifenhe and Hunchun, and 320 kilometres (200 mi) away from the provincial capital of Harbin.

=== Flora and fauna ===
112 species of plants used for Chinese herbal medicines can be found in Ning'an.

Ning'an is home to a number of protected animal species, such as the Siberian tiger, sika deer, elk, and sable. There are over 300 species of birds which have habitats in the city, including Siberian cranes, Mandarin ducks, Chinese merganser, white-bellied sea eagles, and Steller's sea eagles.

=== Climate ===
The city experiences an average annual temperature of 4.5 °C (40.1 °F), with the hottest recorded temperature in the city being 36.5 °C (97.7 °F), and the coldest record temperature being −40.1 °C (−40.2 °F). Annual precipitation in Ning'an typically ranges from 500 mm (20 in) to 600 mm (24 in). Ning'an typically experiences 130 to 135 frost-free days per year.

Climate data for Ning'an, elevation 268 m (879 ft), (1991–2020 normals, extremes 1981–2010)
| Month | Jan | Feb | Mar | Apr | May | Jun | Jul | Aug | Sep | Oct | Nov | Dec | Year |
|---|---|---|---|---|---|---|---|---|---|---|---|---|---|
| Record high °C (°F) | 4.6 (40.3) | 11.7 (53.1) | 19.2 (66.6) | 30.4 (86.7) | 32.7 (90.9) | 37.0 (98.6) | 37.5 (99.5) | 36.2 (97.2) | 29.9 (85.8) | 26.5 (79.7) | 19.8 (67.6) | 9.6 (49.3) | 37.5 (99.5) |
| Mean daily maximum °C (°F) | −10.4 (13.3) | −4.6 (23.7) | 3.5 (38.3) | 13.8 (56.8) | 20.9 (69.6) | 25.6 (78.1) | 27.8 (82.0) | 26.6 (79.9) | 21.6 (70.9) | 13.3 (55.9) | 1.4 (34.5) | −8.0 (17.6) | 11.0 (51.7) |
| Daily mean °C (°F) | −17.7 (0.1) | −12.2 (10.0) | −2.8 (27.0) | 7.1 (44.8) | 14.3 (57.7) | 19.4 (66.9) | 22.2 (72.0) | 21.0 (69.8) | 14.8 (58.6) | 6.4 (43.5) | −4.3 (24.3) | −14.3 (6.3) | 4.5 (40.1) |
| Mean daily minimum °C (°F) | −23.6 (−10.5) | −19.0 (−2.2) | −8.9 (16.0) | 0.6 (33.1) | 8.0 (46.4) | 13.9 (57.0) | 17.6 (63.7) | 16.6 (61.9) | 9.1 (48.4) | 0.6 (33.1) | −9.3 (15.3) | −19.5 (−3.1) | −1.2 (29.9) |
| Record low °C (°F) | −41.2 (−42.2) | −39.7 (−39.5) | −26.4 (−15.5) | −11.0 (12.2) | −2.9 (26.8) | 5.6 (42.1) | 10.4 (50.7) | 7.7 (45.9) | −3.8 (25.2) | −15.2 (4.6) | −26.6 (−15.9) | −36.1 (−33.0) | −41.2 (−42.2) |
| Average precipitation mm (inches) | 5.2 (0.20) | 4.2 (0.17) | 12.0 (0.47) | 26.6 (1.05) | 61.5 (2.42) | 72.4 (2.85) | 118.8 (4.68) | 118.1 (4.65) | 58.8 (2.31) | 32.5 (1.28) | 17.2 (0.68) | 5.8 (0.23) | 533.1 (20.99) |
| Average precipitation days (≥ 0.1 mm) | 3.8 | 3.3 | 6.0 | 8.2 | 13.7 | 14.4 | 14.1 | 14.0 | 10.1 | 8.0 | 6.1 | 5.0 | 106.7 |
| Average snowy days | 7.3 | 5.9 | 8.3 | 3.9 | 0.1 | 0 | 0 | 0 | 0 | 2.3 | 6.8 | 8.7 | 43.3 |
| Average relative humidity (%) | 70 | 64 | 58 | 53 | 59 | 69 | 77 | 80 | 75 | 66 | 66 | 70 | 67 |
| Mean monthly sunshine hours | 176.4 | 193.5 | 227.0 | 222.7 | 240.4 | 247.9 | 241.9 | 229.3 | 233.2 | 204.2 | 165.5 | 159.5 | 2,541.5 |
| Percentage possible sunshine | 61 | 65 | 61 | 55 | 53 | 54 | 52 | 53 | 63 | 61 | 58 | 58 | 58 |
Source: China Meteorological Administration

== Administrative divisions ==
Ning'an administers one subdistrict, eight towns, two townships, two ethnic townships, and two other township-level divisions.

The city's sole subdistrict is Chengqu Subdistrict.

The city's eight towns are Ning'an, Dongjingcheng, Bohai, Shiyan, Shalan, Hailang, Langang, and Jingpo.

The city's two townships are Mahe Township and Sanling Township.

The city's two ethnic townships are Jiangnan Korean and Manchu Ethnic Township and Wolong Korean Ethnic Township.

The city also administers Dongjingcheng Forestry Bureau and Ning'an Farm as township-level divisions.

== Demographics ==
Ning'an Ethnic Composition (2019)
| Ethnic group | Population (approximate) | Percentage |
|---|---|---|
| Han Chinese | 356,400 | 81.0% |
| Manchu | 38,720 | 8.8% |
| Korean | 34,320 | 7.8% |
| Others | 10,560 | 2.4% |
| Total | 440,000 | 100.0% |

== Economy ==
Ning'an produces a large amount of edible mushrooms, totaling 10,000 tons per year.

== Transportation ==
The G11 Hegang–Dalian Expressway runs through the city, as does the Mudanjiang–Tumen railway.

The city is located 19 kilometres (12 mi) away from the Mudanjiang Hailang International Airport.

== See also ==
- List of provinces of Balhae
