= Yerofey Khabarov =

17th-century Russian explorer

- Ерофей Хабаров
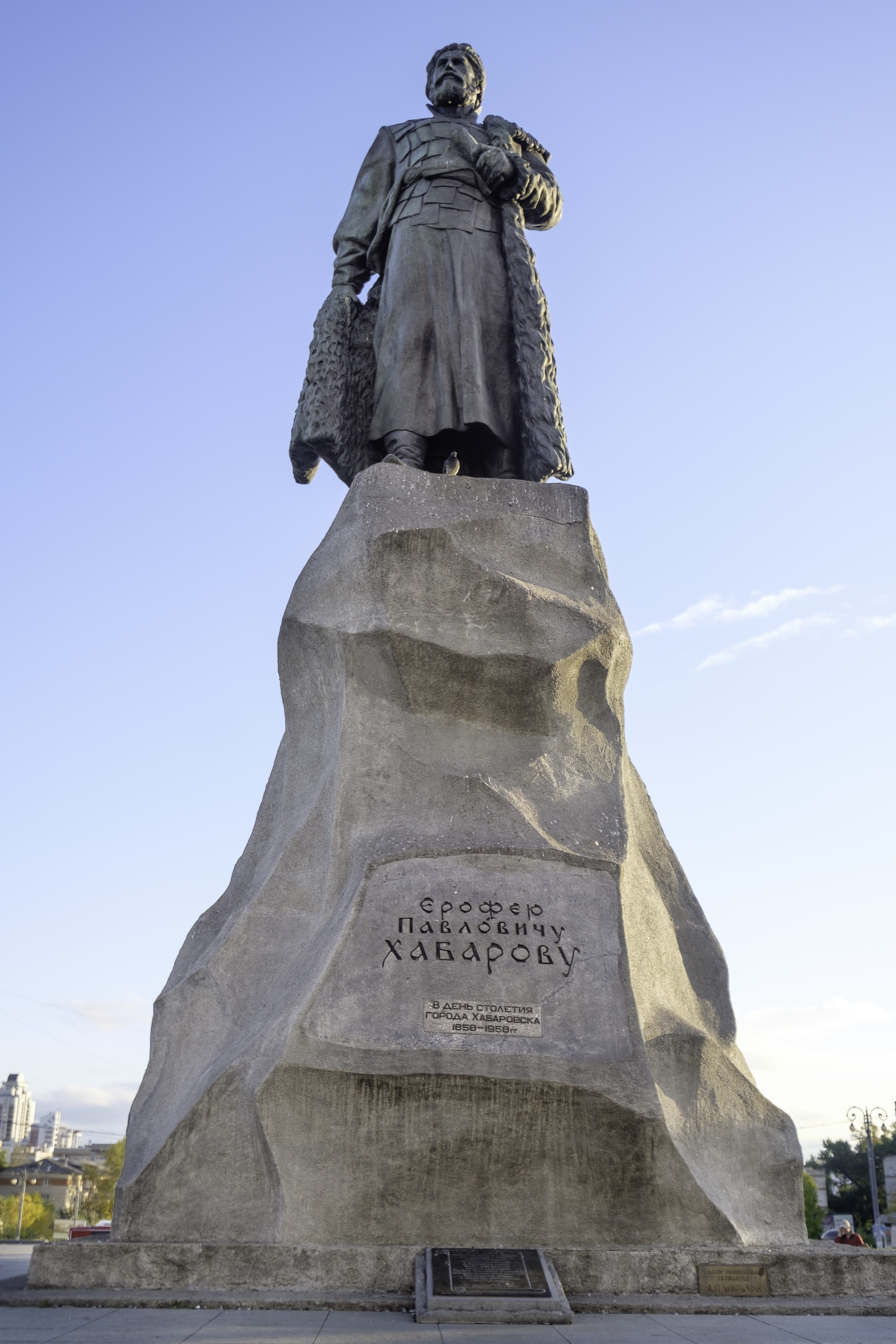
- The monument to Yerofey Khabarov in Khabarovsk
- Born: c. 1603; Kotlassky District in Arkhangelsk Oblast
- Died: 1671; Bratsk or Kirensk in Irkutsk Oblast
- Citizenship: Tsardom of Russia

Yerofey Pavlovich Khabarov (Note: The first name is often spelled Ярофей (Yarofey) in contemporary accounts.) (Russian: Ерофе́й Па́влович Хаба́ров; 1603 – after 1671) was a Russian entrepreneur and zemleprokhodets, best known for exploring the region along the river Amur and for his attempts to colonize the area for Russia. The major Russian city of Khabarovsk and the small town and railway station Yerofey Pavlovich (located on the Trans-Siberian railroad in Amur Oblast) bear his name. The icebreaker Ledokol-5, built in 1963, was renamed Yerofey Khabarov in 1966.

== Background ==
Khabarov's surname is recorded as Svyatitsky in a number of primary documents. He was born into a peasant family in the village of Svyatitsa in the Veliky Ustyug area in the northern part of European Russia. He was a manager for the Stroganovs at the saltworks in Solvychegodsk. In 1625, Khabarov sailed from Tobolsk to Mangazeya. He left the town with his expedition three years later and reached the Kheta River in the eastern part of the Taymyr Peninsula. In 1630, Khabarov took part in a voyage from Mangazeya to Tobolsk. In 1632–1641, he reached the Lena River and founded a farming settlement with saltworks along the Lena at the mouths of the Kuta and Kirenga Rivers.

== First expedition, 1649–1650 ==
In 1649, Khabarov became the second Russian to explore the Amur, after Vassili Poyarkov in 1643–1646. Poyarkov's route up the Aldan River was too difficult to be practical. At some point, Khabarov attempted to reach the Amur via the Vitim River. In 1647, a hunter returned to Yakutsk from the Olyokma River and reported that this might lead to the Amur. In the spring of 1649 Khabarov set off at his own expense up the Olyokma River, then its branch, the Tungir and portaged to the Shilka River. Reaching the upper Amur (Dauria) in early 1650, he found the country nearly deserted, the Cossacks' reputation having preceded them. Having pioneered a good route, he returned to Yakutsk in May 1650 and gave his report. He praised the land, warned of the danger of Chinese intervention and suggested a larger expedition with professional soldiers.

== Second expedition, 1650–1653 ==
Given the time delays in communicating with Moscow, the voivode of Yakutsk Dmitry Frantsbekov decided to act independently and sent Khabarov back south with a larger force. The voivode also gave Khabarov letters from Tsar Alexis to the Daurian prince Lavkai of Albazin and "Prince Bogdoi" (Russian: Князь Богдой), asking those potentates to submit to the Russian Tsar, and threatening to send a 6,000-strong army if they did not obey. Frantsbekov assumed that this Prince Bogdoi was another Siberian chieftain. He was, in fact, the Emperor of China.

Khabarov crossed the mountains in the fall of 1650 and this time was met with armed resistance. He built winter quarters at Albazin at the northernmost point of the Amur. After receiving reinforcements in June 1651 he set off down the Amur. By September, they reached the mouth of the Sungari. By 29 September, they reached Achansk near present-day Khabarovsk and decided to winter there. On 8 October, they were attacked by about 1,000 local people, who, being defeated, appealed to their Manchu overlords. On March 24, 1652, 2,000 Manchus and Koreans armed with artillery arrived from Ninguta and attacked Achansk. Khabarov somehow managed to defeat them. (The Manchu general, Haise, was later executed for his incompetence.) Not knowing how many more Chinese were in the area, on 22 April he withdrew up the Amur. At one point, he encountered another force of 6,000 Chinese but was able to slip around them under cover of fog and darkness. Further upstream he met a force of 117 cossacks who had been sent as reinforcements. He learned from a captive that a new Manchu army was being gathered on the Sungari. On August 1 he reached the mouth of the Zeya. Here 136 of his men mutinied, leaving only 212 loyal. (Since Khabarov mentions the mutiny immediately after mentioning where to build winter quarters, it may have been connected with whether it was wise to remain on the Zeya and await a possible Manchu attack.) From the Zeya, he sent a report to the voivode of Yakutsk matter-of-factly describing the burning of villages, slaughter of natives and the torture of prisoners.

From this point the English sources become unclear. They apparently wintered at the Zeya. In the fall of 1653, 150 reinforcements under Dimitry Zinoviev appeared. As a nobleman, Zinoviev demanded full command. When Khabarov refused, he was arrested. Unable to gain the support of Khabarov's men and having no adequate way to deal with the Manchus, Zinoviev and part of the force withdrew from the Amur. Onufriy Stepanov was left in charge of those who remained.

Khabarov was deprived of his rank and property and was sent on a fifteen-month journey to Moscow to be tried. After a year's delay he was acquitted. He was given a minor noble rank (Syn boyarsky of Ilimsk) on the condition that he return to Siberia. He reappears again in the records in 1658, when the Siberian Office ordered that he be placed in irons if he refused to guide a new expedition to the Amur. After that he disappears from the records.

Khabarov charted the Amur river in his Draft of the Amur River (Russian: Чертёж реки Амур).

== See also ==
- Albazinians
- Oros Niru

== Sources ==
- W. Bruce Lincoln, The Conquest of a Continent: Siberia and the Russians, 1994
