= Onufriy Stepanov =

Russian explorer

Onufriy Stepanov (Russian: Онуфрий Степанов; died June 30, 1658) was a Siberian Cossack and explorer of the Amur River. For background see Russian–Manchu border conflicts.

1653: After Yerofey Khabarov’s arrest and departure to Moscow in the fall of 1653, Onufriy Stepanov was appointed his deputy in the region of Dauria (upper reaches of the Amur River) and put in charge of the 320 men who remained there. Stepanov and his men suffered privations without enough grain and timber, so they decided to sail down the Amur River beyond the Sungari River to the Ducher country in order to procure food and building materials. Stepanov succeeded in his mission, but not without skirmishes with the Duchers, exacting a considerable yasak from them. Here he built winter quarters.

1654: In the summer of 1654, Stepanov sailed back to the Sungari River to find grain and was joined by another band of 50 cossacks. After sailing up the Sungari for three days he met a Manchu army under the command of Mingandali. (according to Stepanov, it consisted of 3,000 Chinese and Manchus, not including the Duchers and Daurs). A river battle ensued, and Stepanov and his men came off victorious, but the remaining Manchu forces went ashore and entrenched themselves. The Cossacks made an attempt to besiege the trenches, but sustained losses and had to retreat downriver where they were joined by 30 men under sotnik Beketov. He retreated up the Amur, past the Zeya to the mouth of the Kamora River, and wintered at the half-ruined Kamora fortress (Каморский острог).

1655: Fearing attack, Stepanov began rebuilding the desolate settlement and its fortifications. These precautions paid off, when a Manchurian army of 10,000 soldiers led by Mingandali besieged the Kamora fortress on March 13, 1655. The outnumbered defenders repulsed several assaults, but the Manchus ran short of food and lifted the siege the on April 3, 1655, after destroying the Russian boats.

1655–58: After this incident Stepanov ordered a few of his men to travel to Moscow, Arica and deliver the yasak, collected during his stay in the Amur region. Meanwhile, fifty Tomsk Cossacks led by a boyar son Fyodor Pushchin (who had been fighting the Tungus at the mouth of the Argun River) joined Onufriy Stepanov. Once again, Stepanov headed towards the grain-rich region of the Sungari River. After having refreshed his supplies, Stepanov and his men made their way to the Gilyak country on the lower Amur. There, the Cossacks built a fort and collected a yasak consisting of sable, red and silver fox fur. Meanwhile, the living conditions along the Amur River grew worse from year to year because most of the native population had been impoverished by the Cossacks’ exactions and had left the area. Also, Stepanov found out that the Daurs and Duchers had been resettled by the order of their Shunzhi Emperor from the Amur River to the Kurga River. Thus, the Amur region became almost completely deserted, the shores of the Sungari River in particular. An increasing number of outlaws in the area would prey on both the natives and the legal Cossacks. Stepanov and his men would often encounter uluses, sacked and burnt down by robbers. The Cossacks found themselves in a critical situation, especially considering the fact that they lacked manpower to fight their way to more fertile lands. To avoid death from starvation, Stepanov's men had to plough and scatter the fields with seeds themselves. It was pointless to remain in this region any longer, so Onufriy Stepanov waited for an opportunity to leave. On July 22, 1656, he dispatched a group of fifty Cossacks to Moscow to deliver a new yasak, providing them with a letter asking the tsar not to send his men back to him due to the lack of food in the Amur region. In his reply, Alexei Mikhailovich thanked Stepanov and his subordinates for their great service and instructed them to "conduct themselves bravely". Soon enough, the Cossacks grew completely desperate and began to run away from their leader. Negotiations between Moscow and the Manchus stalled, help was nowhere in sight, and natives’ animosity towards the Cossacks grew stronger every day.

1658: Stepanov began preparations for an advance towards a region with a more favorable and friendly environment. On June 30, 1658, below the mouth of the Sungari, Stepanov's 11-boat fleet with 500 Cossacks aboard was surrounded by 40 (or 45, or 45–47) boats of the Qing general Sarhuda, with some 1400 Manchu and Korean soldiers aboard, armed with cannons and arquebuses. Exhausted and demoralized, Onufriy Stepanov and his Cossacks could not offer any serious resistance and were defeated. Stepanov was either killed during the fight or drowned while trying to cross the Amur River. The Manchus captured the Russian's yasak and released over a hundred Ducher women kept by the Cossacks on their boats. 270 Russians were lost and 222 escaped, of whom 180 formed themselves into outlaw bands that lived by raiding the natives in the Zeya area until they were largely wiped out by the Manchus in 1660.

Such a tragic finale of the Stepanov party discouraged the Russian leaders from collecting yasak from the natives of the Amur region and made them abandon its official conquest for the next 15 or so years. A number of cossacks continued to live and raid in the area unofficially.
