= Daur people =

Mongolian ethnic group

Daur
ᡩᠠᡤᡠᠷ
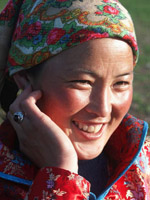
- Daur woman in Inner Mongolia, China

Total population
- 132,299 (2020 census)

Regions with significant populations
- People's Republic of China, in Inner Mongolia, Heilongjiang, and Xinjiang
- China: 132,299
- Mongolia: 3,000

Languages
- Daur, Chinese, Mongol

Religion
- Mongolian shamanism and Tibetan Buddhism

Related ethnic groups
- Buryats, Mongols, and Khitans

The Daurs, Dagur, Daghur, or Dahur (Dagur:ᡩᠠᡤᡠᠷDaure; Khalkha Mongolian: Дагуур, Daguur; simplified Chinese: 达斡尔族; traditional Chinese: 達斡爾族; pinyin: Dáwò'ěr zú; Russian: Дауры, Daury) are a Mongolic people originally native to Dauriya and now predominantly located in Northeast China (and Siberia, Russia, in the past). The Daur form one of the 56 ethnic groups officially recognized in the People's Republic of China. They numbered 132,299 according to the latest census (2020) and most of them live in Morin Dawa Daur Autonomous Banner in Hulun Buir, northeastern Inner Mongolia and Meilisi Daur District in Qiqihar, Heilongjiang, Northeast China. Some Daur people also live near Tacheng in Xinjiang.

== Language ==
The Dagur language is a Mongolic language. There is a Latin-based orthography which has been devised by a native Daur scholar. The Dagur language retains some Khitan substratal features, including a number of lexemes not found in other Mongolic languages. It is made up of three dialects: Batgan, Hailar, Qiqihar.

During Qing rule, some Daur spoke and wrote Manchu as a second language.

== History ==
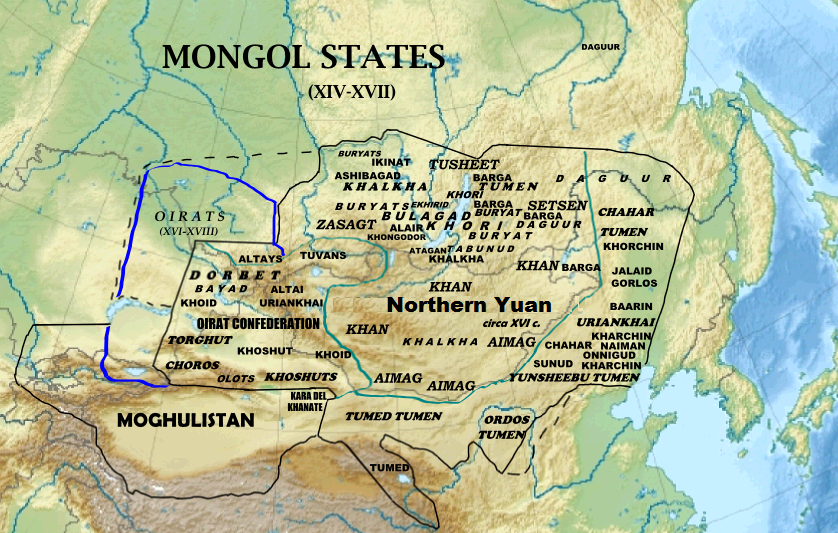
Location of the Daur (Daguur) in the 16th century.

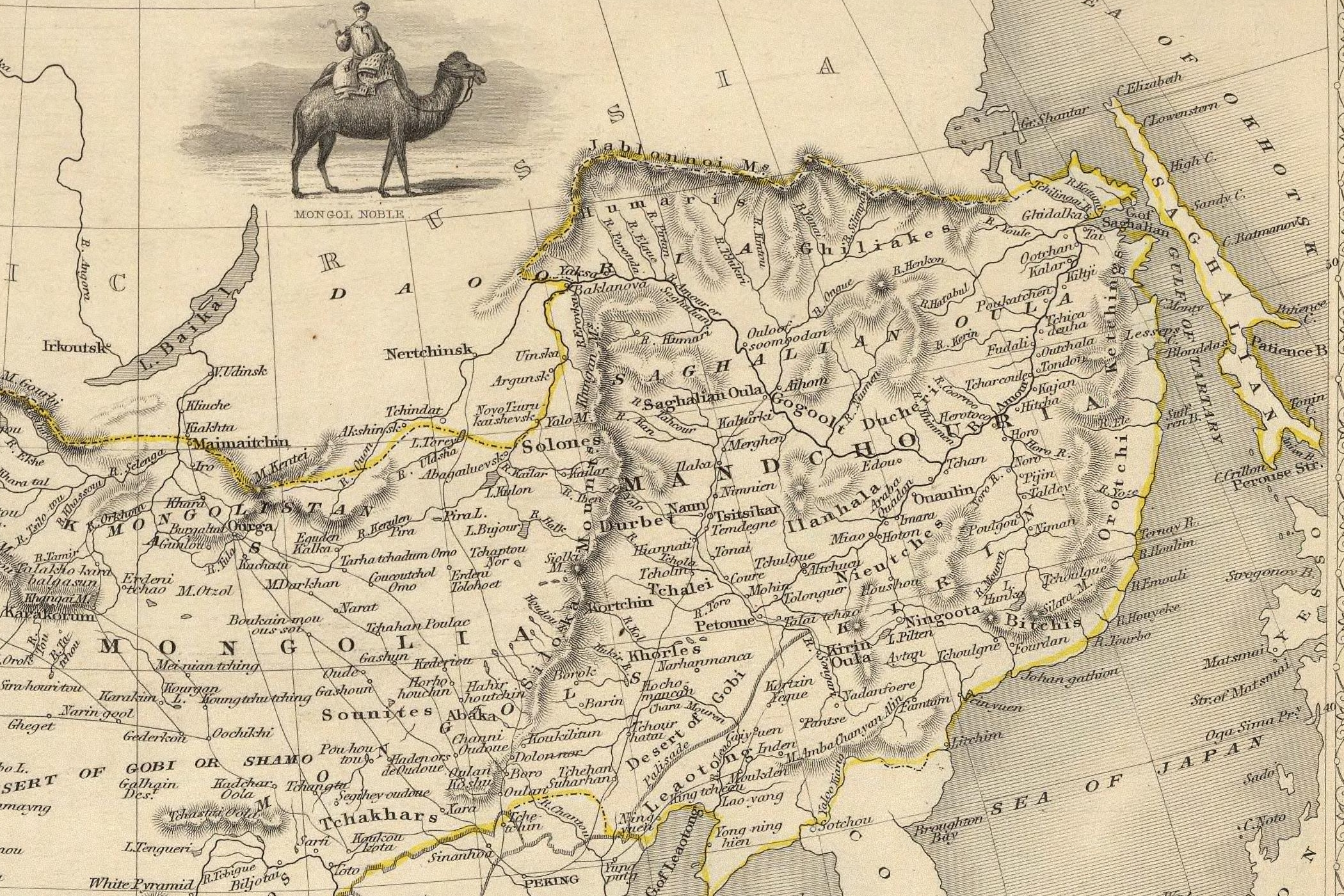
Dauria on a British 1851 map. As the map was published 7 years before the Treaty of Aigun, eastern (Amur) Dauria is still shown as part of the Qing dynasty

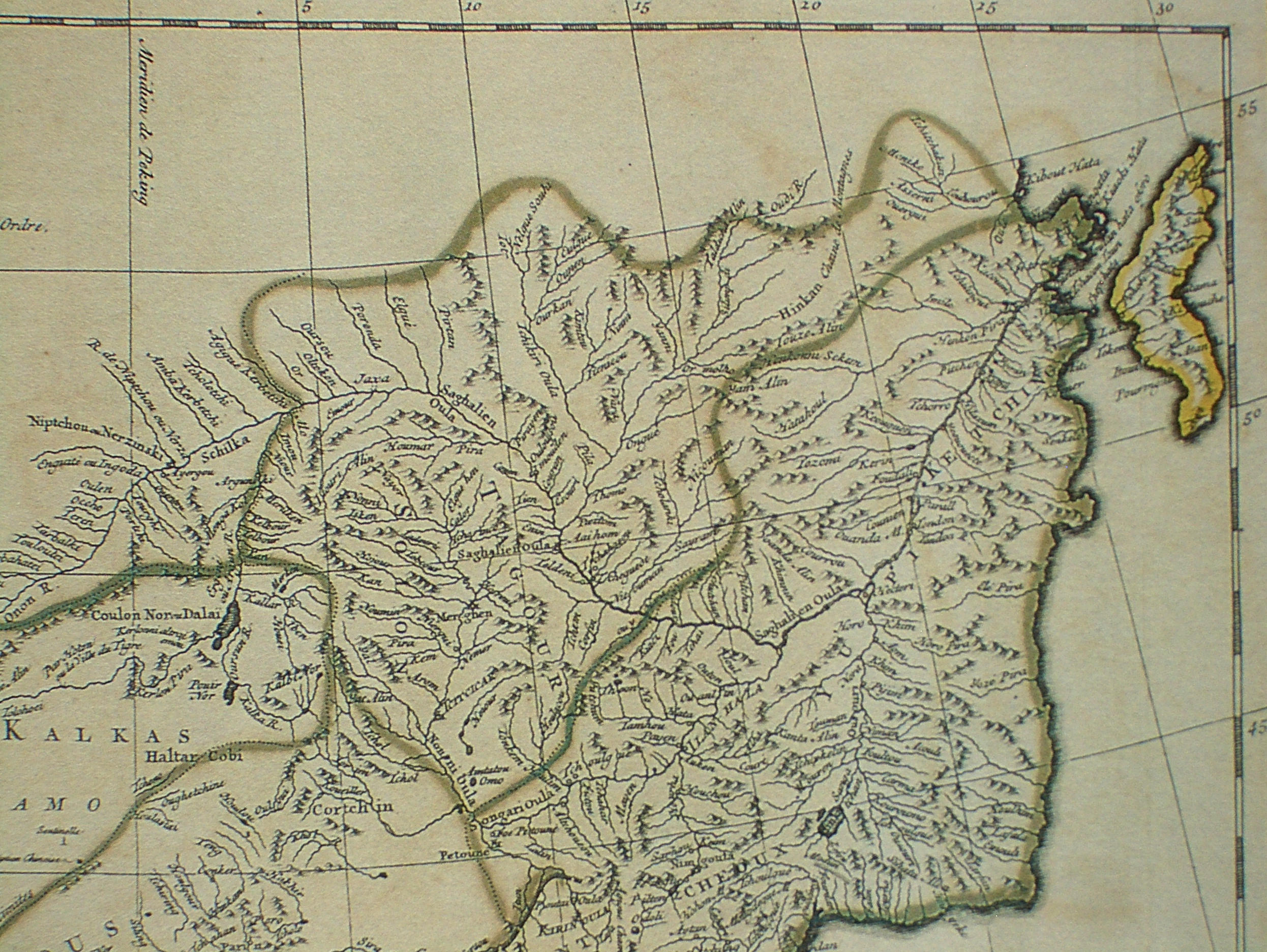
The Daur (Tagour) placed between the Nonni River and the Amur River on a 1734 French map. Yaxa was a Daurian town prior to its fall to Khabarov's Russian raiders in 1651.

Genetically, the Daurs are descendants of the Khitan. In the Qianlong Emperor's "钦定《辽金元三史语解》" (Imperially commissioned Translations of the History of Liao, History of Jin and History of Yuan) he retranslates "大贺", a Khitan clan described in the History of Liao, as "达呼尔". That is the earliest theory that claims Daurs are descendants of Khitans.

In the 17th century, some or all of the Daurs lived along the Shilka, upper Amur, on the Zeya and Bureya River. They thus gave their name to the region of Dauria.

By the mid-17th century, the Amur Daurs fell under the influence of the Manchus of the Qing dynasty which crushed the resistance of Bombogor, leader of the Evenk-Daur Federation in 1640. When the Russian explorers and raiders arrived to the region in the early 1650 (notably, during Yerofei Khabarov's 1651 raid), they would often see the Daur farmers burn their smaller villages and taking refuge in larger towns. When told by the Russians to submit to the rule of the Tsar and to pay yasak (tribute), the Daurs would often refuse, saying that they already paid tribute to the Shunzhi Emperor (whose name the Russians recorded from the Daurs as Shamshakan). The Cossacks would then attack, usually being able to take Daur towns with only small losses. For example, Khabarov reported that in 1651 he had only 4 of his Cossacks killed while storming the town of the Daur prince Guigudar (Гуйгударов городок) (another 45 Cossacks were wounded, but all were able to recover). Meanwhile, the Cossacks reported killing 661 "Daurs big and small" at that town (of which, 427 during the storm itself), and taking 243 women and 118 children prisoners, as well as capturing 237 horse and 113 cattle. The captured Daur town of Yaxa became the Russian town Albazin, which was not recaptured by the Qing until the 1680s.

Cattle and horses in the hundreds were looted and 243 ethnic Daur girls and women were raped by Russian Cossacks under Yerofey Khabarov when he invaded the Amur river basin in the 1650s.

Facing the Russian expansion in the Amur region, between 1654 and 1656, during the reign of Shunzhi Emperor, the Daurs were forced to move southward and settle on the banks of the Nen River, from where they were constantly conscripted to serve in the banner system of the Qing emperors.

Russian Cossack soldiers slaughtered 1,266 households, 900 Daurs during the Blagoveshchensk massacre and Sixty-Four Villages East of the River massacre.

When the Japanese invaded the area of present-day Morin Dawa in Inner Mongolia in 1931, the Daurs carried out an intense resistance against them.

Konan Naito pointed out that Takri Kingdom where King Dongmyeong, a founder of Buyeo was born, as a country of Daur people who lived by Songhua River.

== Culture ==
There is a very noticeable hierarchic structure. People sharing the same surname are in groups called hala, they live together with the same group, formed by two or three towns. Each hala is divided in diverse clans (mokon) that live in the same town. If a marriage between different clans is made, the husband continues to live with the clan of his wife without holding property rights.

During the winter, the Daur women wear long dresses, generally blue in color and boots of skin which they change for long trousers in summer. The men dress in orejeros caps in fox or red deer skin made for winter. In the summer, they cover the animal's head with white colored fabrics or straw hats.

A customary sport of the Daur is Beikou, a game similar to field hockey or street hockey, which has been played by the Daur for about 1,000 years.

== Religion ==
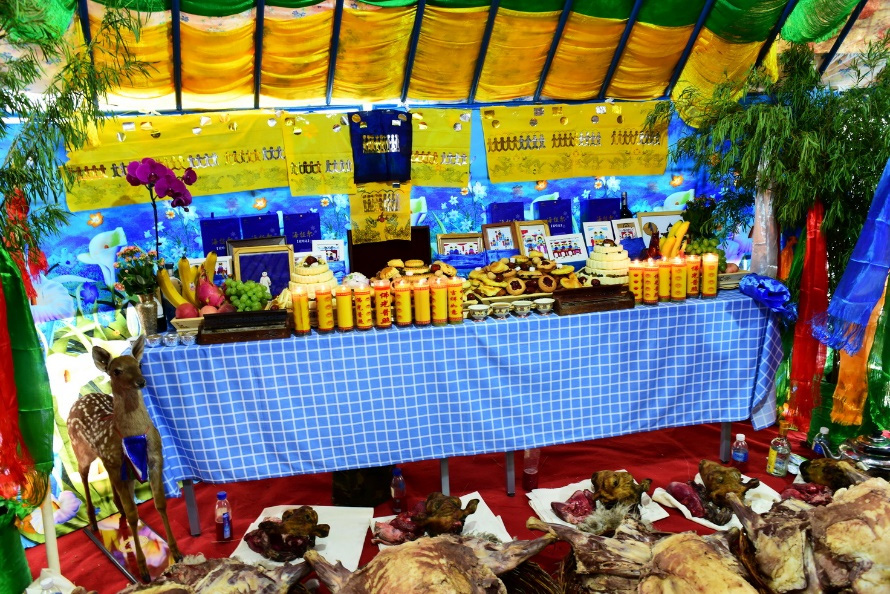
Spirit images and offerings on a Daur shaman's altar

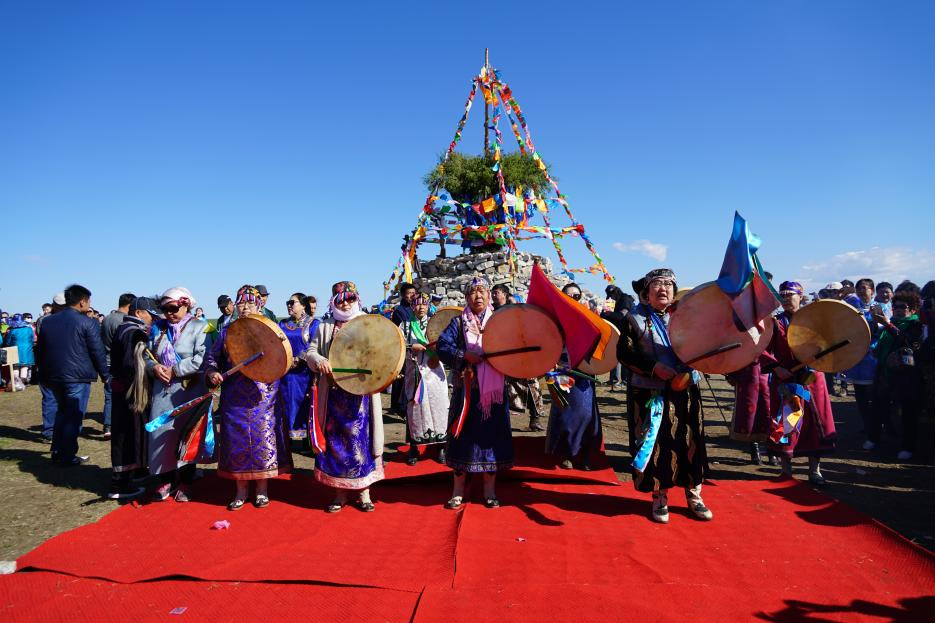
Daur shamanic ritual at the Ewenki Autonomous Banner, 2017

Many Daurs practice shamanism. Each clan has its own shaman in charge of all the important ceremonies in the lives of the Daur. However, there are a significant number of Daurs who have taken up Tibetan Buddhism.

A cult of the sky "tenger" occupies an important place in Daurian shamanism. Ancient people worshiped the image of "tenger" as the sun and the moon. The sun also appeared as mother in mythical representation. Ancient people considered the sun and the moon as a man and a woman respectively. These celestial bodies represent father and mother in the mythology of the Daurs.

During the Qing, the Daur knew a version of the Tale of the Nisan Shaman, in which the female shaman Ny Dan competed against her rivals at the Qing court, the Tibetan monks who managed to convince the Qing emperor to execute her. The Qing emperor is shown as a fool who is tricked by the lamas.

== Notable people ==
- Rongyuan (1884-1951), Qing dynasty court official
- Urgunge Onon (1920-2015), historian and scholar
- Khorloogiin Choibalsan (1895 – 1952), leader of Mongolia
