= Birobidzhan railway station =

Railway station in Birobidzhan, Russia

Birobidzhan-1 Биробиджан-1
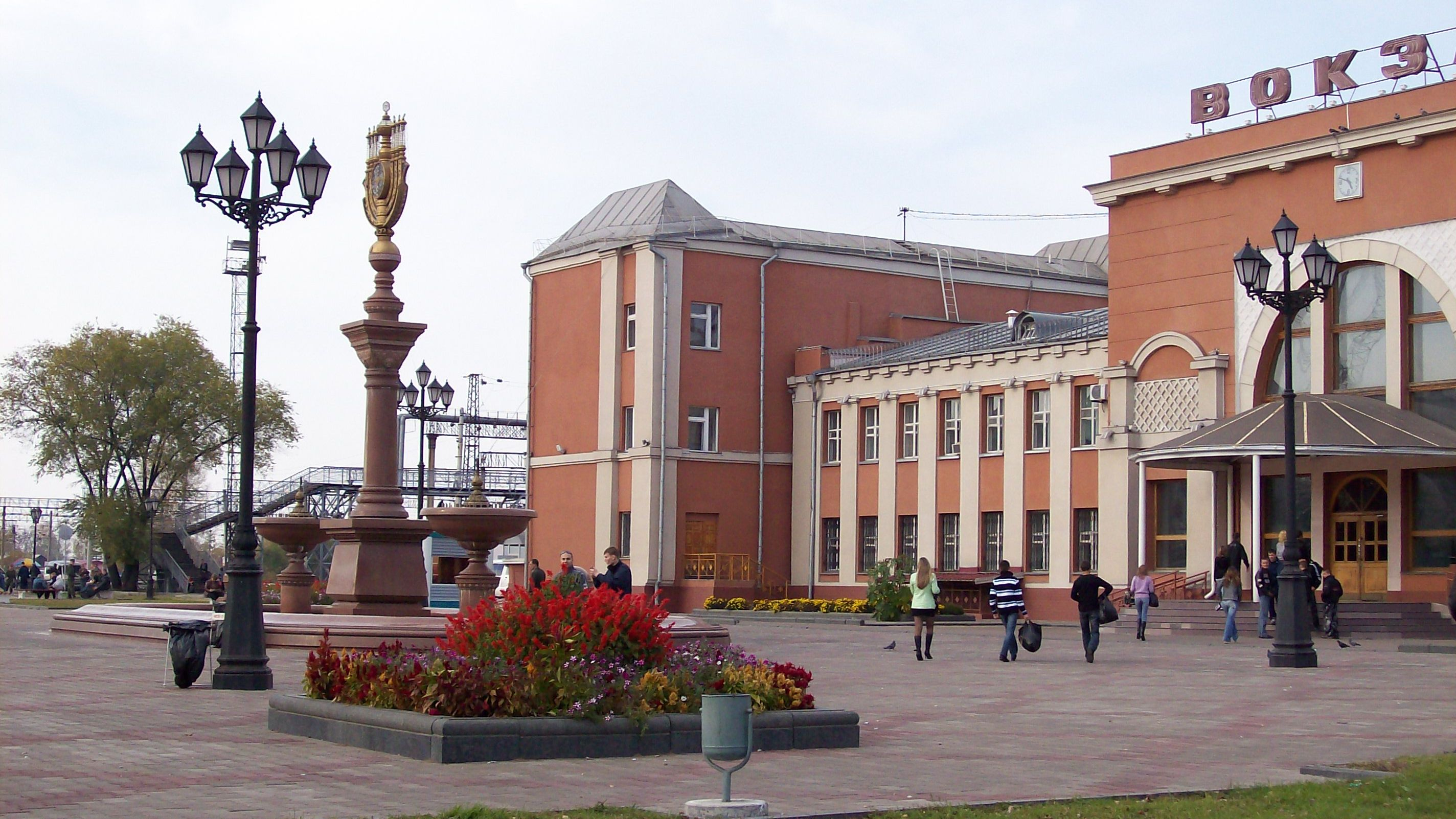

General information
- Location: Birobidzhan, Jewish Autonomous Oblast; Russia
- Coordinates: 48°47′34.4″N 132°56′06″E
- Owner: Russian Railways
- Operator: East Siberian Railway
- Platforms: 2
- Tracks: 6

Construction
- Structure type: At-grade
- Parking: Yes

Other information
- Station code: 962804
- Fare zone: 0

History
- Opened: 1915

Services
Preceding station	Russian Railways	Following station
Bira towards Moscow Yaroslavsky	Moscow–Vladivostok	In towards Vladivostok
Chita towards Moscow Yaroslavsky	Moscow–Vladivostok Major stations	Khabarovsk towards Vladivostok
Location

Birobidzhan Railway Station is the primary passenger railway station for the city of Birobidzhan in Russia, and an important stop along the Trans-Siberian Railway.

== History ==
In 1912 the first wooden railway station building was built in the village of Tikhonkaya during the construction of Amur Railway. In 1935 the construction of a stone building was completed, the architect was Hannes Meyer.

== Trains ==
- Moscow — Vladivostok
- Novosibirsk — Vladivostok
- Moscow — Khabarovsk
- Khabarovsk — Neryungri
- Khabarovsk — Chegdomyn
