= Vladimir Volegov =

Spanish artist (born 1957)

- Born: 19 December 1957 (age 68); Khabarovsk, Russian SSR
- Occupation: Painter
- Years active: 1986-
- Spouse: Ekaterina (m. 1999)
- Website: https://www.volegov.com/

Vladimir Volegov (born in Khabarovsk, 19 December 1957) is a painter from Russia who lives in Spain. His early work centred on graphic art for music recordings, comics, and commercial posters. He is known in the West for his oil paintings, which often depict outdoor family life scenes.

== Career ==
Volegov graduated in 1986 from the Lvov Institute of Printing Art. He then began his career in Moscow as a graphic artist working in the music-record, comics, and advertising industries.

From 1986, Volegov lived in Western Europe as a street painter while developing his realistic style, often representing feminine beauty, maternity and childhood in "romantic" settings. Volegov in 2015 participated as an invited artist at the anniversary exhibition of the Waterhouse Gallery in Santa Barbara, California.

== Personal life ==
Volegov married Ekaterina in 1999. Seven years after their marriage, they moved to Spain in 2006, also the year their son was born.
