= Khabarovsk railway station =

Railway station in Khabarovsk, Russia

Khabarovsk-1 Хабаровск-1
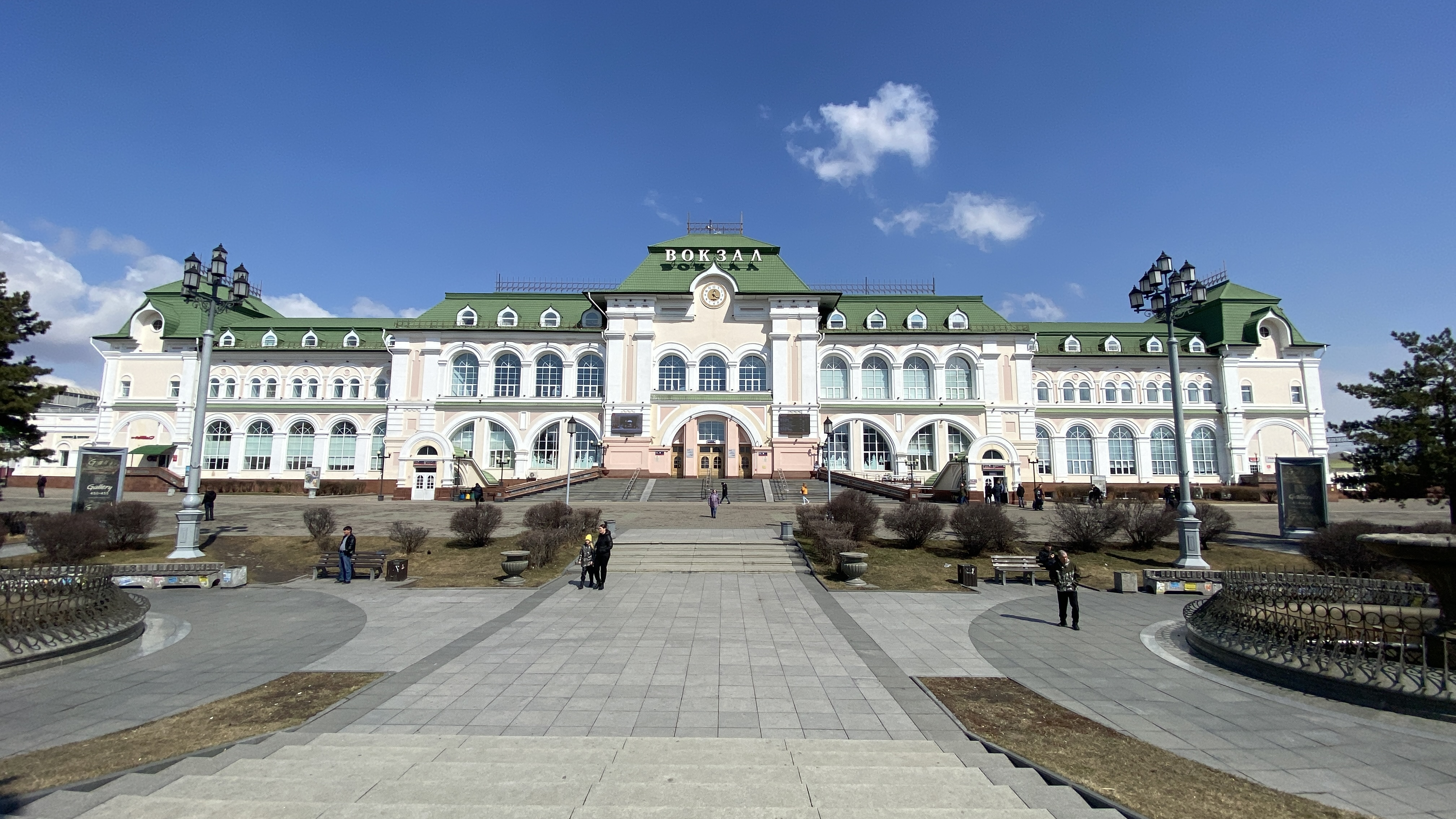

General information
- Location: Khabarovsk Krai, Khabarovsk; Russia
- Coordinates: 48°29′47.65″N 135°4′21.77″E
- Owner: Russian Railways
- Operator: Far Eastern Railway
- Platforms: 5
- Tracks: 18
- Connections: Trams in Khabarovsk

Construction
- Structure type: At-grade
- Parking: Yes

Other information
- Station code: 970406
- Fare zone: 0

History
- Opened: 1897

Services
Preceding station	Russian Railways	Following station
Priamurskaya towards Moscow Yaroslavsky	Moscow–Vladivostok	Korfovskaya towards Vladivostok
Birobidzhan towards Moscow Yaroslavsky	Moscow–Vladivostok Major stations	Vladivostok Terminus
Location

The Khabarovsk Railway Station is a railway station in Khabarovsk, Russia, and an important station of the Trans-Siberian Railway.

== History ==
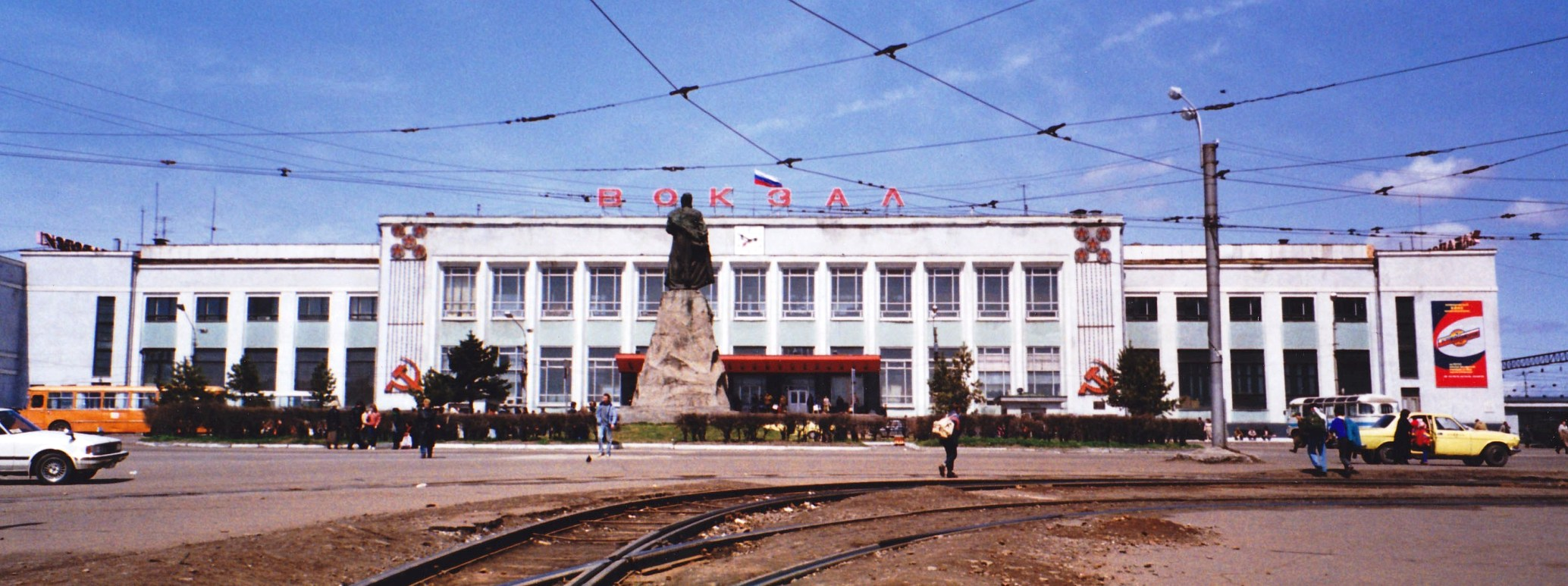
Khabarovsk-1 station and Khabarovsk tram in 1992

The first station building was built on November 1, 1897. It represented a typical one-story wooden building with an area of about one hundred square meters. In December 1921, it burned down as a result of the panic evacuation of parts of the People's Revolutionary Army of the Far Eastern Republic from Khabarovsk. A new one-story stone building in the Russian Revival architecture was built in November 1926, and the entire station complex was completed in 1935. The construction of the new building on the pre-revolutionary project - an exceptional case in the history of architecture of the Soviet period. The station room for passenger service was insufficient. The building was designed to stay 700 passengers per day, but sometimes more than 1500 people used this station per day. The approach to the trains was carried out directly through the tracks, which, while simultaneously stopping several trains, created inconveniences. The project for the reconstruction of the station was sent to the Ministry of Railways in 1956, but this issue was not implemented. In 1963, the reconstruction of the station began, completed by 1966. The main station building was built a reinforced concrete two-story building in the style of functionalism. An underground pedestrian to go to platforms was built. In March 2000, reconstruction of building was begun, completed in 2007 - the two-story building was turned into a three-story building. As a result of the reconstruction, the building acquired a new architectural look - in the style of Russian modern. Reconstruction of the station complex cost more than 670 million rubles. Ten thousand people can use new station, and almost three million passengers a year.
