= Military History Museum of the Far Eastern Military District =

Military museum in Khabarovsk, Russia

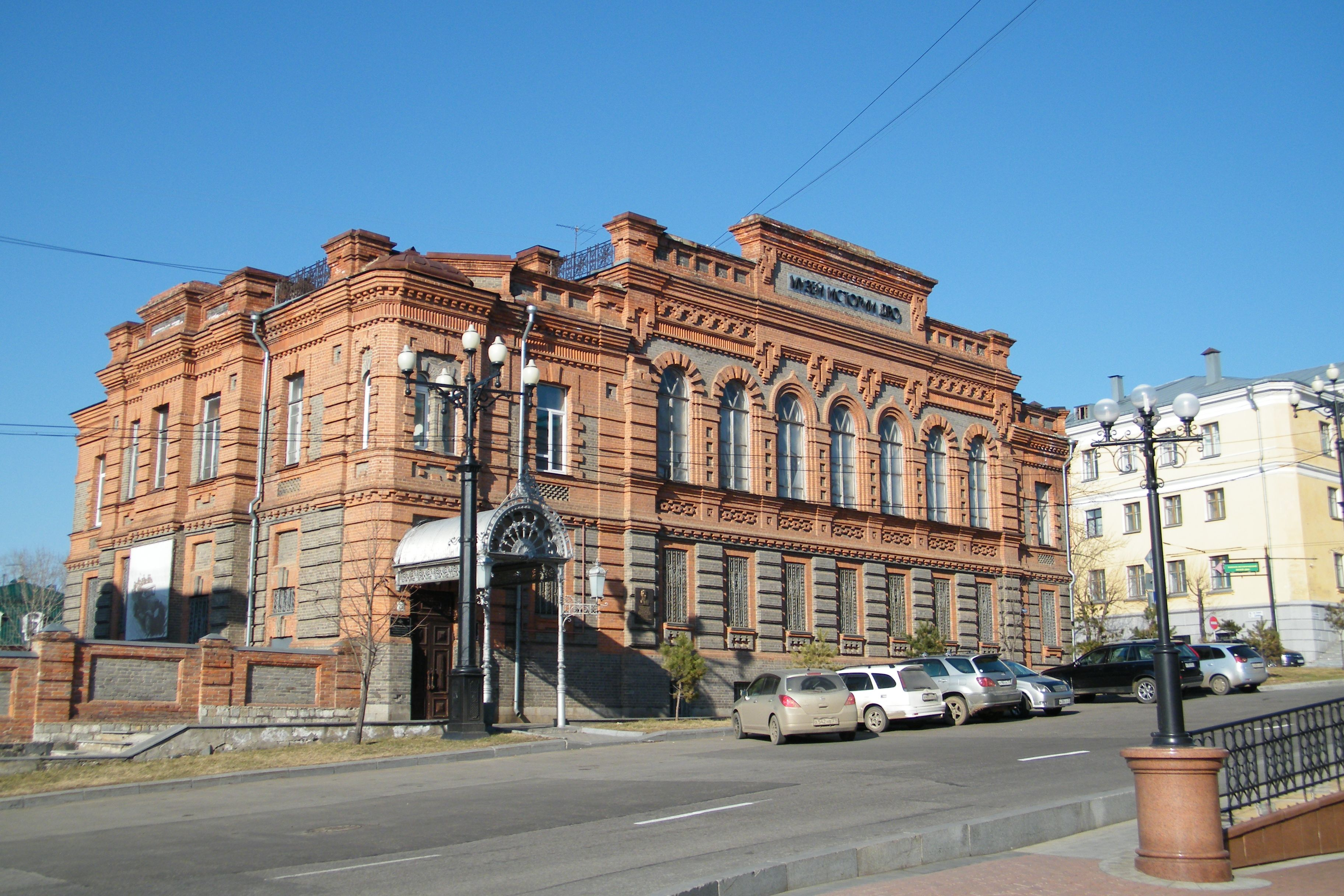
- Established: 1983
- Location: Khabarovsk, Russia
- Coordinates: 48°28′24″N 135°03′10″E
- Owner: Ministry of Defence (Russia)

The Military History Museum of the Far Eastern Military District (Russian: Военно-Исторический Музей Дальневосточного Военного Округа) is a military museum in the Russian city of Khabarovsk. Its collection includes over 38,000 artifacts dating from the 17th century to the First Chechen War. It is the only war museum in the Russian Far East.

== History ==
The Military History Museum of the Far Eastern Military District was created on 31 May 1983, the 125th anniversary of the foundation of Khabarovsk. The commander of the Far Eastern Military District Ivan Tretyak ordered the expansion of the Khabarovsk Officer's House exhibition room into a full fledged museum through the transfer of artifacts from the I.N. Grodekov Local History Museum. The building housing the exhibits was built between 1903 and 1907, it was designed by Khabarovsk engineers N. F. Alexandrov and L. O. Tchaikovsky. It functioned as a branch of Gosbank until 1930, from 1930 until the museum's creation it served various military purposes, in 1945 it was the headquarters of the 2nd Far Eastern Front. A memorial plaque honoring Marshal of the Soviet Union Aleksandr Vasilevsky can be found on the building's facade. The building currently holds the status of an architectural monument of federal importance.

In 2009, Anatoliy Serdyukov was appointed as the new Minister of Defense of Russia. Serdyukov's 2008 Russian military reform was characterized by a sharp cut in spending. Out of the museum's twenty employees only four retained their positions, continuing to work as security personnel. The museum's bank account was also terminated. Although the museum had officially closed, it continued to serve excursions free of charge on rare occasions. In September 2013, the new defense minister Sergey Shoygu initiated a reform sponsoring organizations of cultural importance, effectively reopening the museum. The Khabarovsk Military Museum is the only war museum in the Russian Far East.

== Exhibition ==
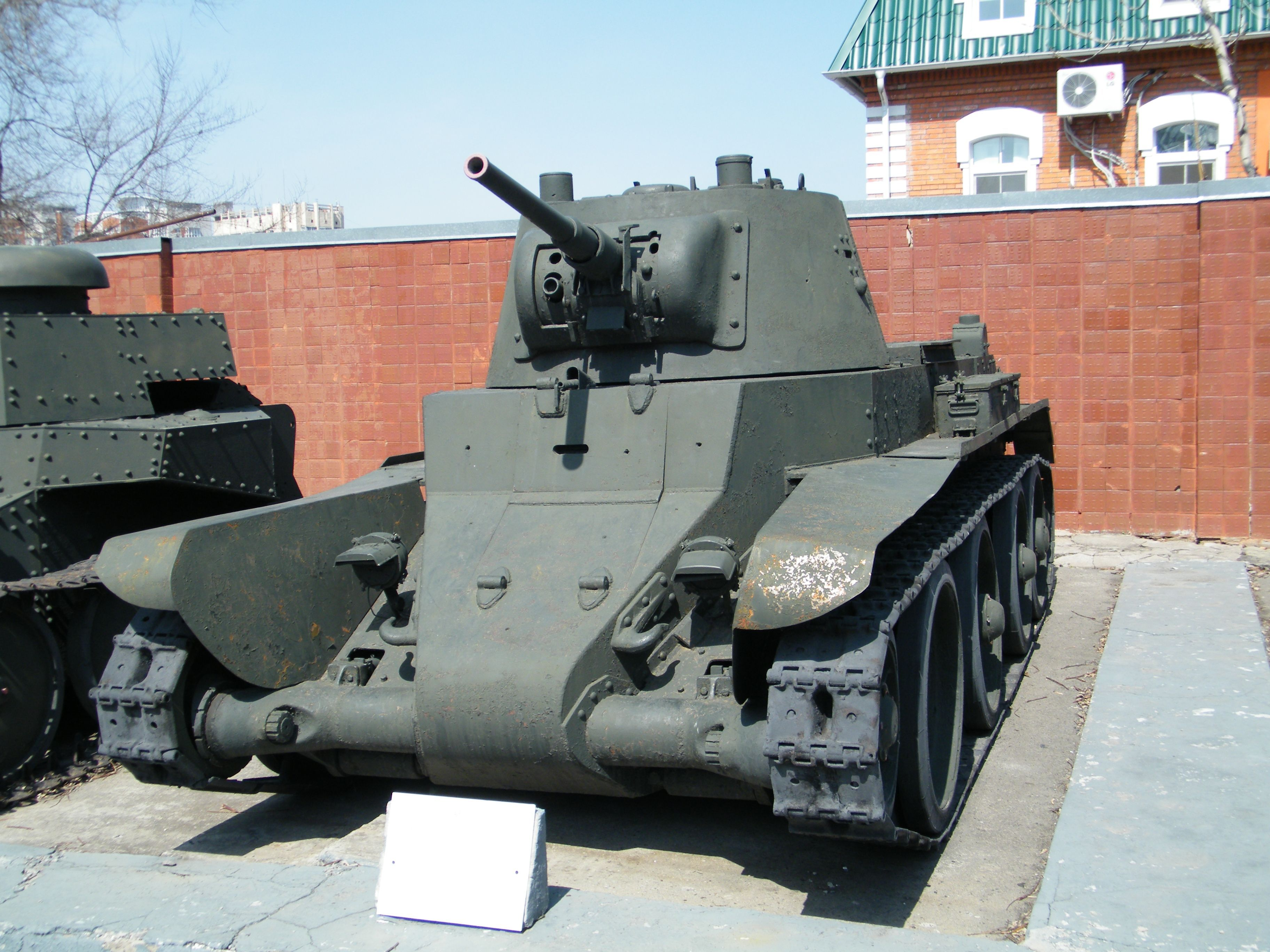
BT-7 cavalry tank

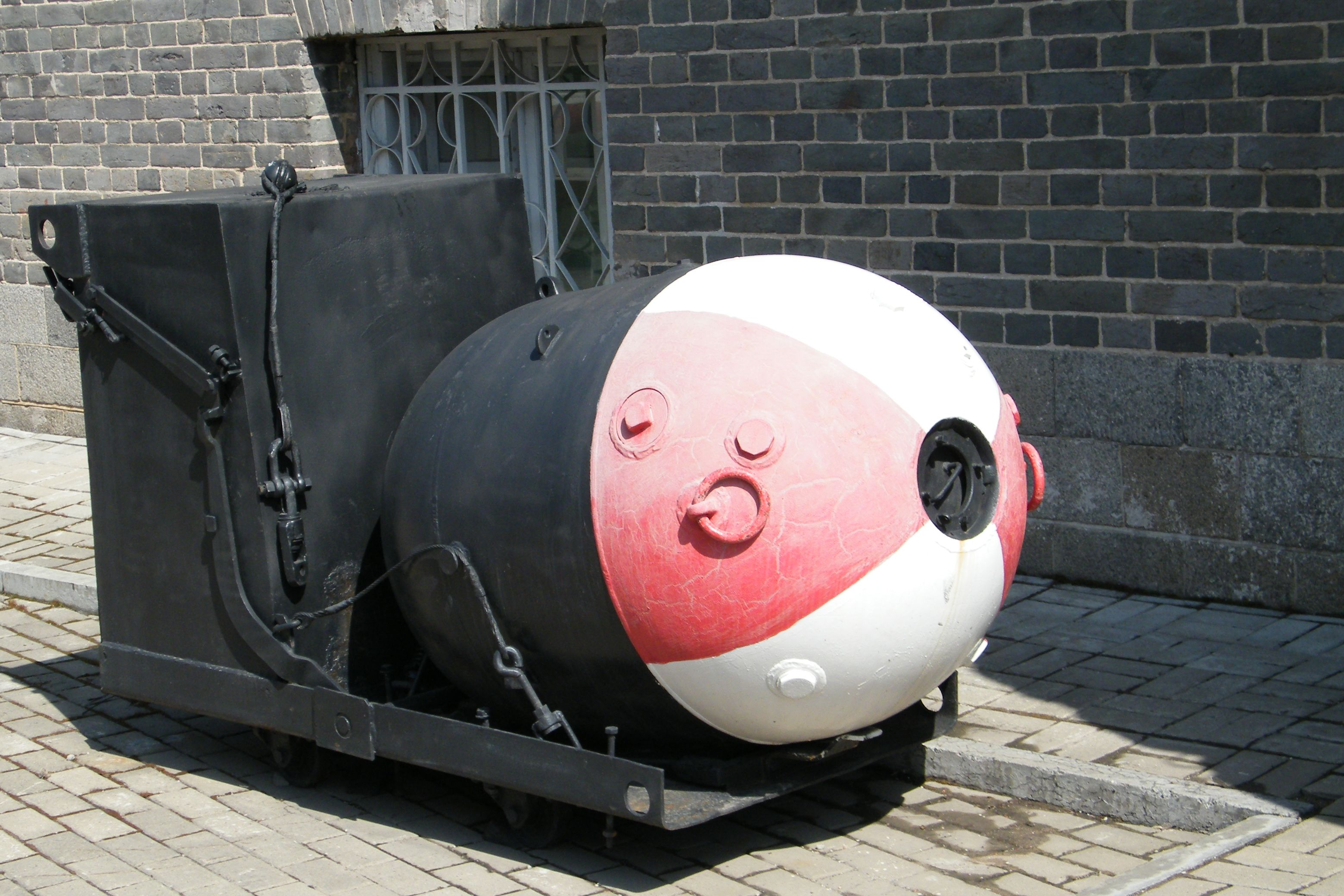
Naval mine

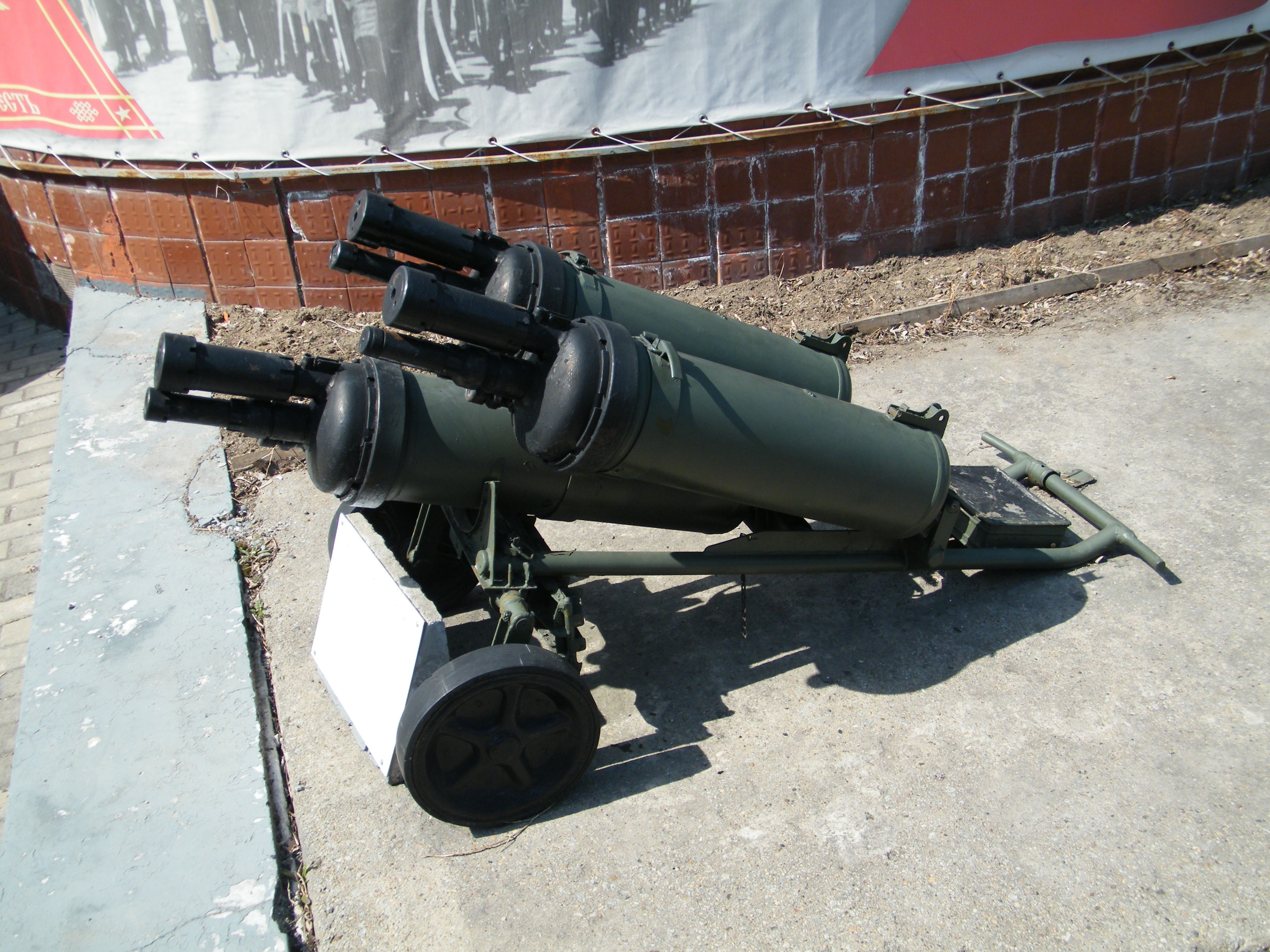
Heavy flamethrower

The museum's collection includes over 38,000 artifacts, stored in thirteen halls. The exhibition begins at the 17th century foundation of the Khabarovka military outpost by the 13th Siberian Battalion. It extensively covers the events of the Russian Civil War in the Far East of the country and includes the train wagon used as headquarters by Vasily Blyukher which can be found in the museum's yard. Other conflicts covered in the museum are the Soviet–Japanese War, Damansky Island Incident, Soviet–Afghan War and the First Chechen War. The collection incorporates banners, paintings, dioramas, medals and decorations, pistols, rifles, uniforms, katanas and other melee weapons from both Russia and abroad. The museum's yard displays tanks, artillery pieces, trucks, naval mines and airplanes.
