= Trams in Khabarovsk =

Coordinates: 48.431600°N 135.112588°E

- Trams in the Khabarovsk Depot

Overview
- Status: Operational
- Owner: MUP "Gorodskoy Elektrotransport"
- Locale: Khabarovsk, Russia
- Website: https://mupget.ru/

Service
- Type: Tramway
- Services: 3
- Operator: MUP "Gorodskoy Elektrotransport"
- Rolling stock: 56 trams

History
- Opened: 5 November 1956

Technical
- Line length: 33.5 km (20.8 mi)
- Num of tracks: double track
- Track gauge: 1,524 mm (5 ft)
- Electrification: yes
Route map
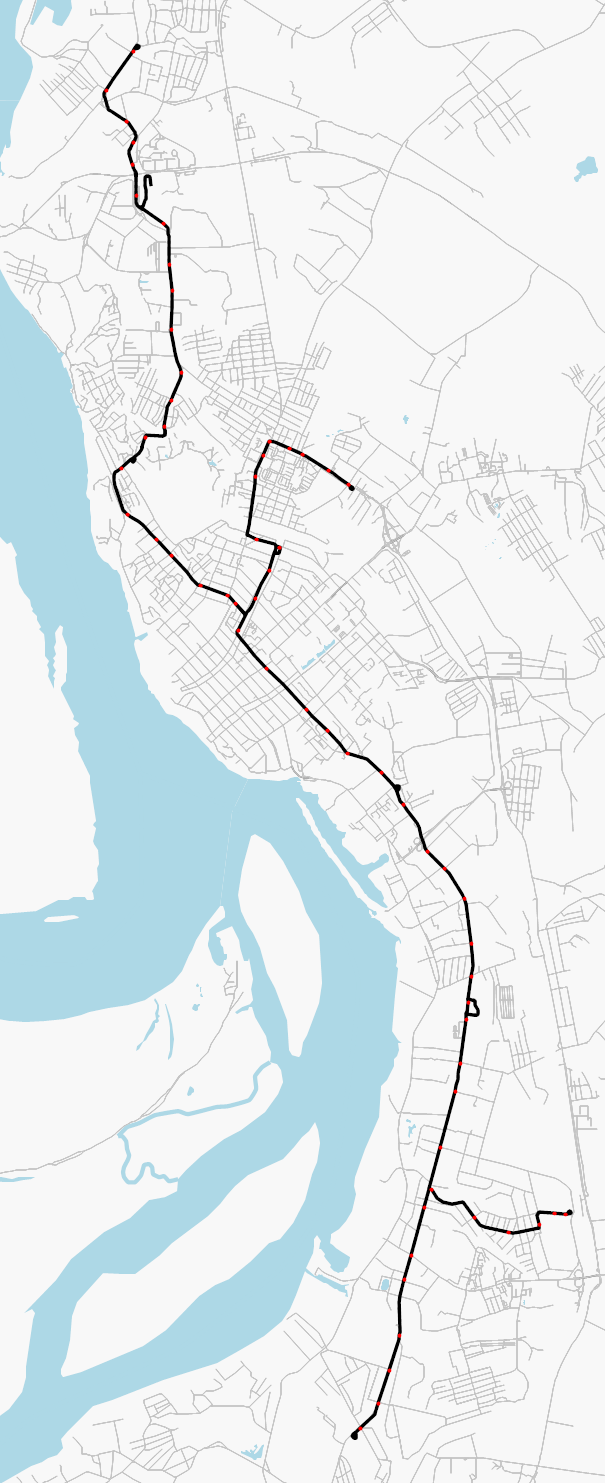

The Tram in Khabarovsk (Russian: Хабаровский трамвай) is one of the primary ways of transportation in Khabarovsk, Russia. The first section opened on 5 November 1956. The last time the network was expanded in 1979. Today, the Khabarovsk Tram network consists of 3 operating routes.

== List of routes ==
1. Chemical Pharmaceutical Factory – Khabarovsk Railway Station

2. Khabarovsk Railway Station – Ruberoidnyi zavod

5. Posyolok Kirova – Khabarovsk Railway Station

== Gallery ==
Khabarovsk
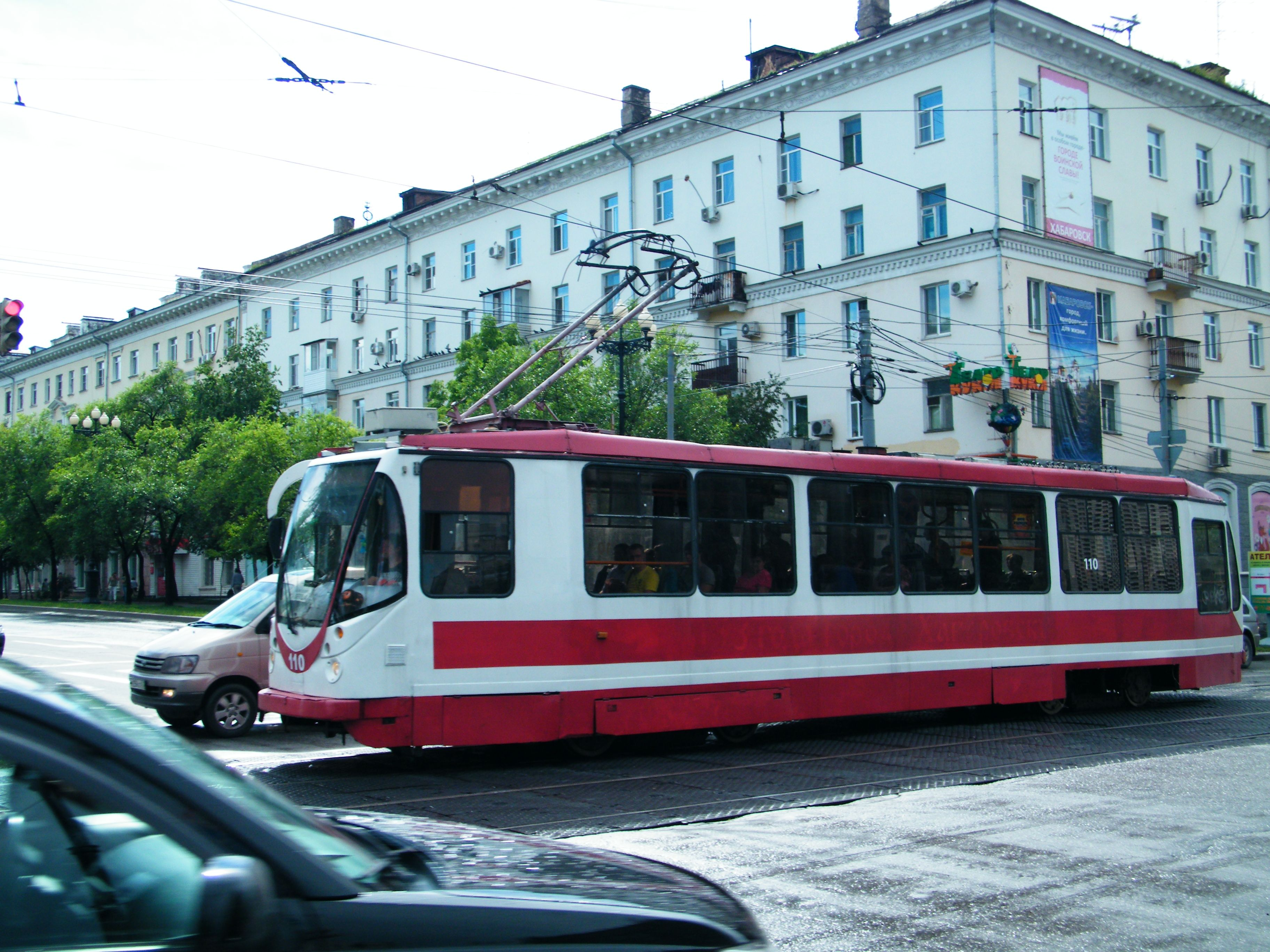
A modern tram in 2014 in the city centre

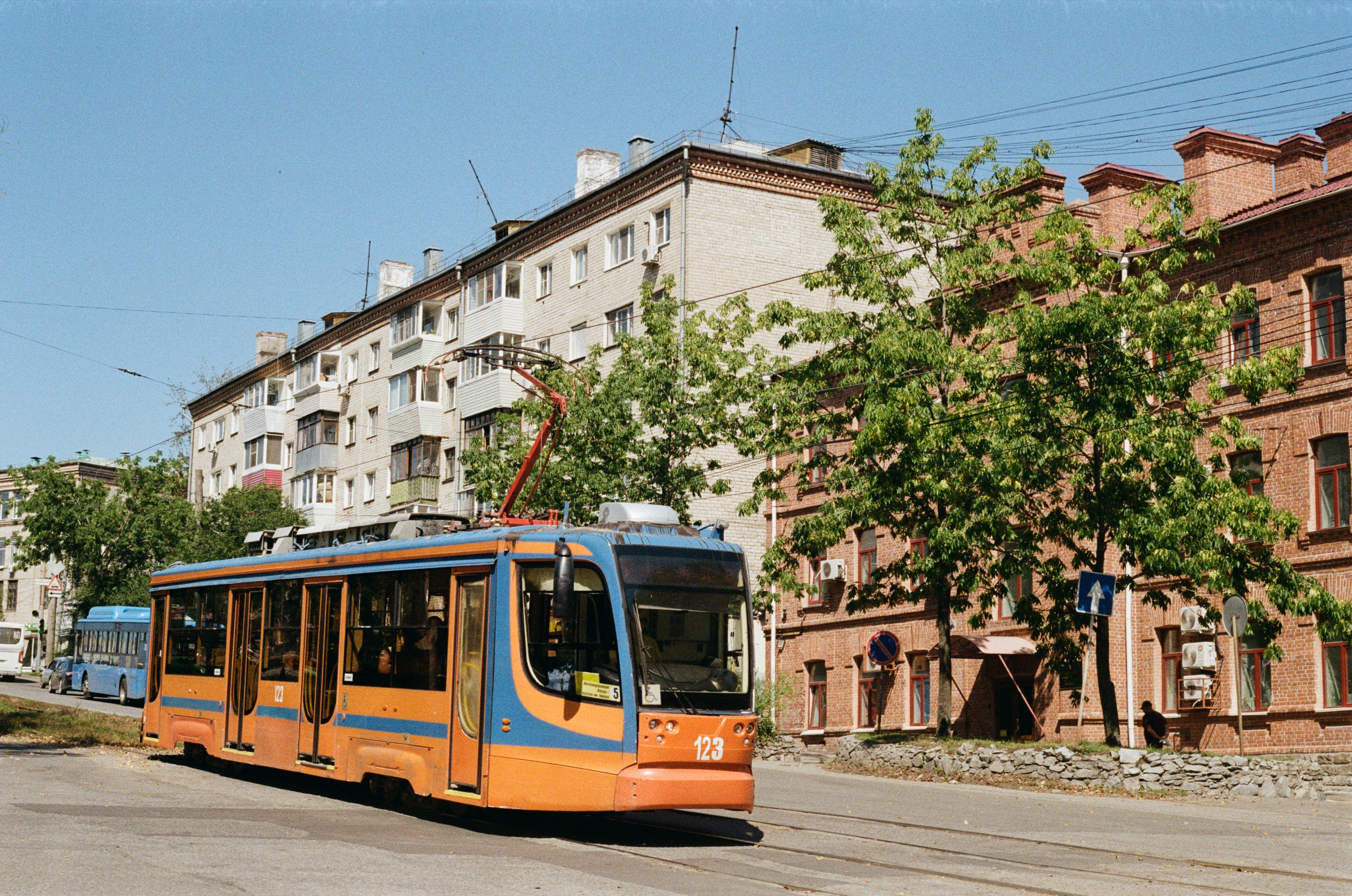
A 71-623 №123 tram on Dhzambula St.. Trams of this type are the most used in Khabarovsk

A modern bus and an old 71-605 №370 tram on the 38-ya Shkola stop

A soviet RVZ-6 tram near the Kirovsky rayon stele

Passengers dismounting an RVZ-6 tram in Khabarovsk

A type 71-605 №388 tram on route 5 beginning it's route near the Posyolok Kirova station

A modern tram with regional coats of arms. The writing says: "Every route is a main one"

A tram made by the Ust-Katav Wagon-Building Plant being towed into the depot

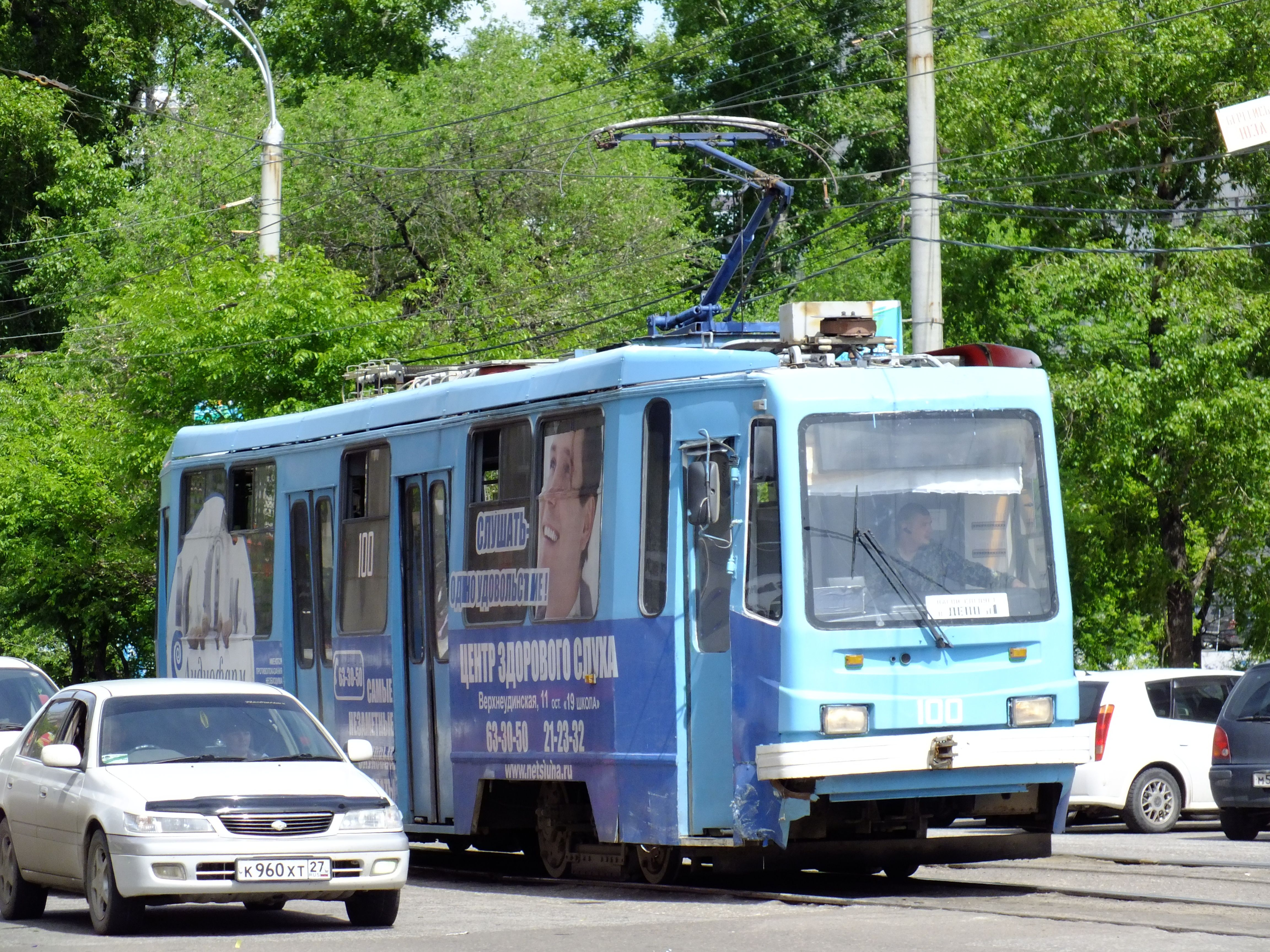
A tram in Khabarovsk with advertisements for hearing aids on it. Putting ads on public transport has been on the decline in Russia

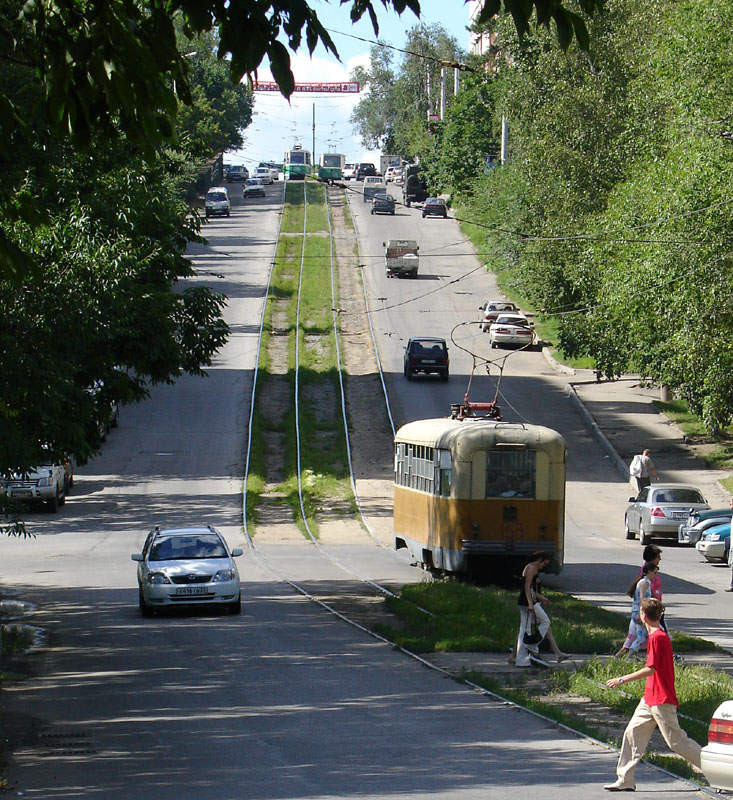
A tram going uphill

== See also ==
- List of town tramway systems in Russia
