= Evgeny Tsaregorodtsev =

Russian ice hockey player

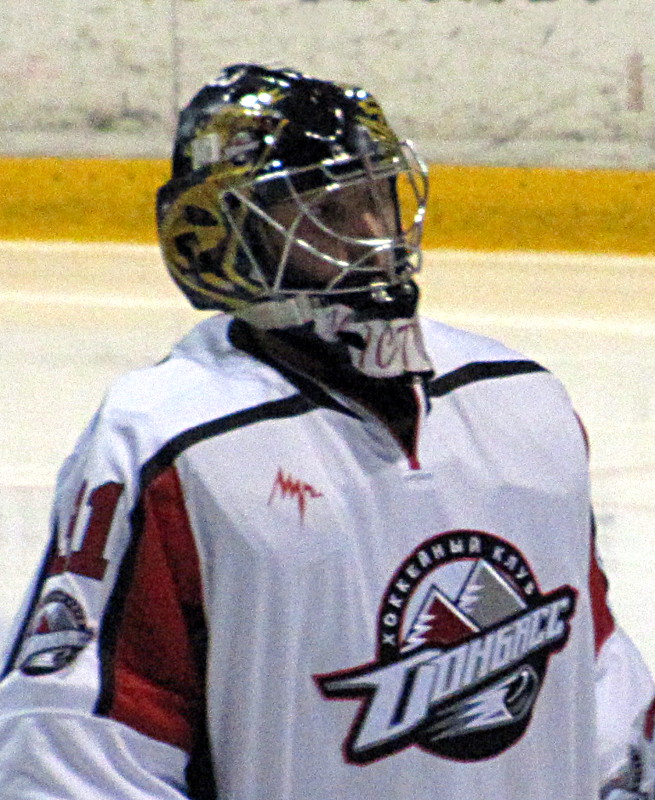
- Born: February 3, 1983 (age 42); Khabarovsk, Russia
- Height: 6 ft 0 in (183 cm)
- Weight: 170 lb (77 kg; 12 st 2 lb)
- Position: Goaltender
- Catches: Right
- KHL team Former teams: Atlant Moscow Oblast; Avangard Omsk; Avtomobilist Yekaterinburg
- NHL draft: Undrafted
- Playing career: 2002–present

Evgeny Tsaregorodtsev (born February 3, 1983) is a Russian professional ice hockey goaltender. He is currently playing with Atlant Moscow Oblast of the Kontinental Hockey League (KHL).

== Career ==
Tsaregorodtsev made his Kontinental Hockey League debut playing with Avangard Omsk during the 2008–09 KHL season. During the 2011–12 season, he played net with HC Donbass of the Russian Major League (VHL).
