= Khabarovsk =

City in Khabarovsk Krai, Russia

Khabarovsk Хабаровск
- City
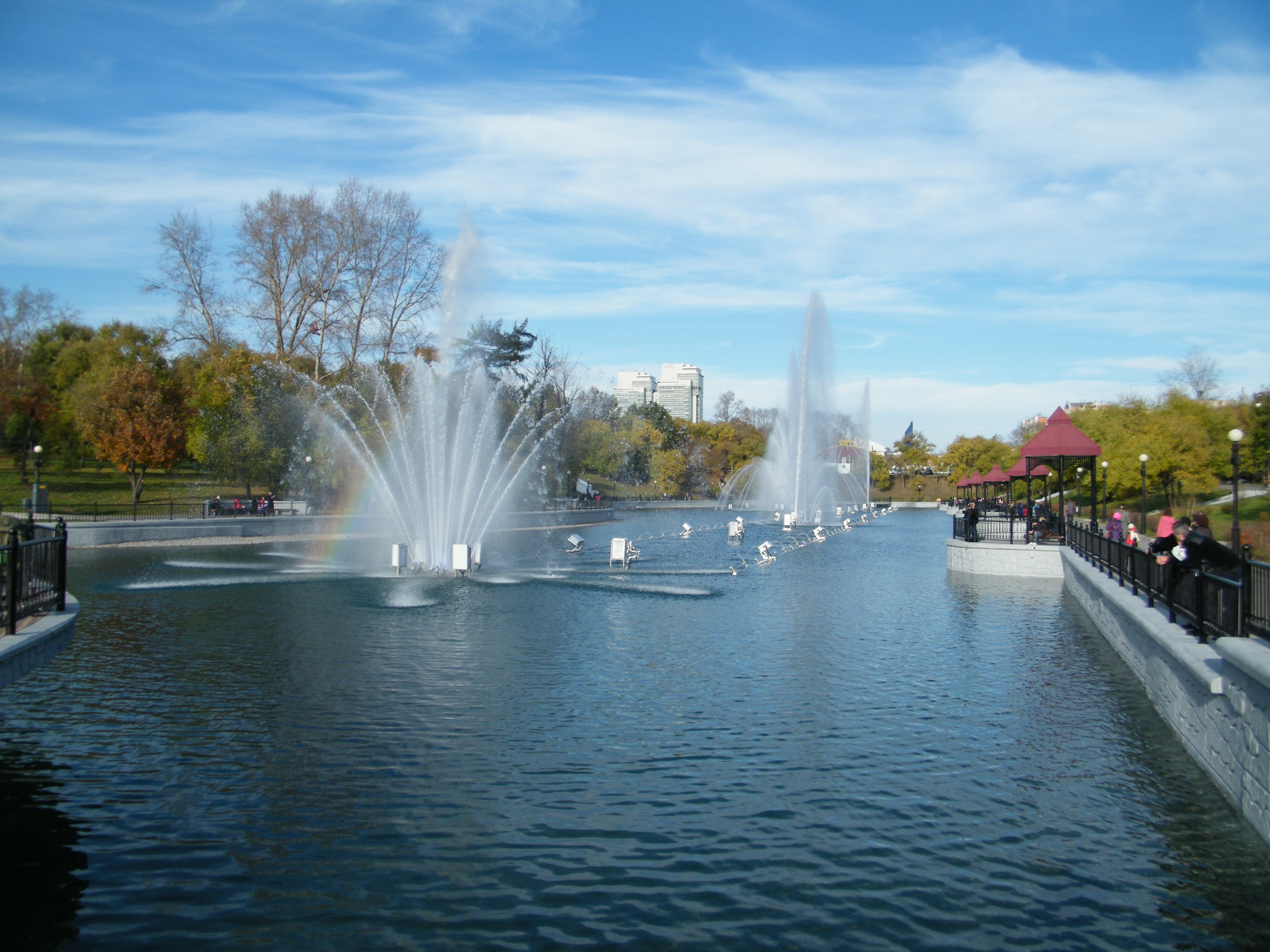
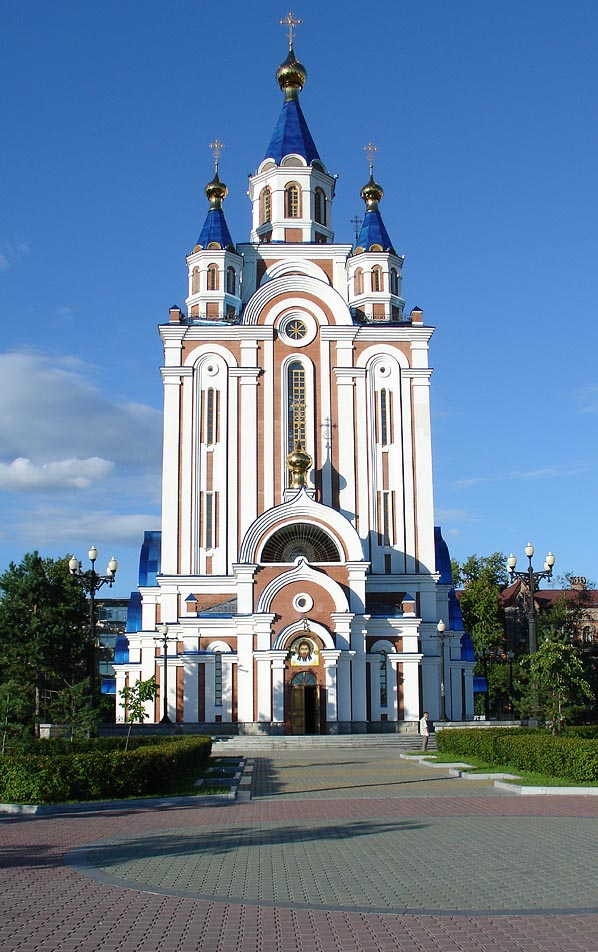
- The Amur Waterfront The Khabarovsk City Ponds The Khabarovsk Dormition Cathedral The Khabarovsk Cliff The Khabarovsk Theological Seminary

- Flag Coat of arms
- Anthem: Anthem of Khabarovsk
- Interactive map of Khabarovsk
- Location of Khabarovsk Khabarovsk (Khabarovsk Krai)
- Coordinates: 48°29′N 135°05′E
- Country: Russia
- Federal subject: Khabarovsk Krai
- Founded: May 31, 1858
- City status since: 1880

Government
  - Body: City Duma
  - Mayor: Sergey Kravchuk

Area
  - Total: 230 km^{2} (89 sq mi)
- Elevation: 72 m (236 ft)

Population (2010 Census)
  - Total: 577,441
  - Estimate (2025): 617,000 (+6.9%)
  - Rank: 26th in 2010
  - Density: 2,500/km^{2} (6,500/sq mi)

Administrative status
  - Subordinated to: city of krai significance of Khabarovsk
  - Capital of: Khabarovsk Krai, city of krai significance of Khabarovsk

Municipal status
  - Urban okrug: Khabarovsk Urban Okrug
  - Capital of: Khabarovsk Urban Okrug, Khabarovsky Municipal District
- Time zone: UTC+10 (MSK+7)
- Postal codes: 680000–680003, 680006, 680007, 680009, 680011–680015, 680017, 680018, 680020–680023, 680025, 680026, 680028–680033, 680035, 680038, 680040–680043, 680045, 680047, 680051, 680052, 680054, 680055, 680700, 680880, 680890, 680899, 680921, 680950, 680960–680967, 680970, 680999, 901183, 901185
- Dialing code: +7 4212
- OKTMO ID: 08701000001
- City Day: Last Sunday of May
- Website: khv27.ru

Khabarovsk (Russian: Хабаровск [xɐˈbarəfsk]) is the administrative centre and largest city of Khabarovsk Krai, Russia, located 30 kilometers (19 mi) from the China–Russia border, at the confluence of the Amur and Ussuri Rivers, about 800 kilometers (500 mi) north of Vladivostok. As of the 2021 Russian census, it had a population of 617,441. It was known as Khabarovka until 1893.

The city was the administrative center of the Far Eastern Federal District of Russia from 2002 until December 2018, when the status was given to Vladivostok. As is typical of the interior of the Russian Far East, Khabarovsk has an extreme climate with strong seasonal swings resulting in strong, cold winters and relatively hot and humid summers.

== History ==
=== Earliest record ===
Historical records indicate that a city was founded on the site in the eighth century. The Tungusic peoples are indigenous to the city's vicinity. The city was named Boli (伯力; Bólì) in Chinese when it was part of the Chinese empire. During the Tang dynasty, Boli was the capital of Heishui Protectorate, called Heishui Duhufu.

In AD 722, Emperor Xuanzong of Tang (唐玄宗) established Heishui Protectorate and gave self-rule to Heishui Mohe tribes. The seat of this administrative region was then established near today's Khabarovsk.

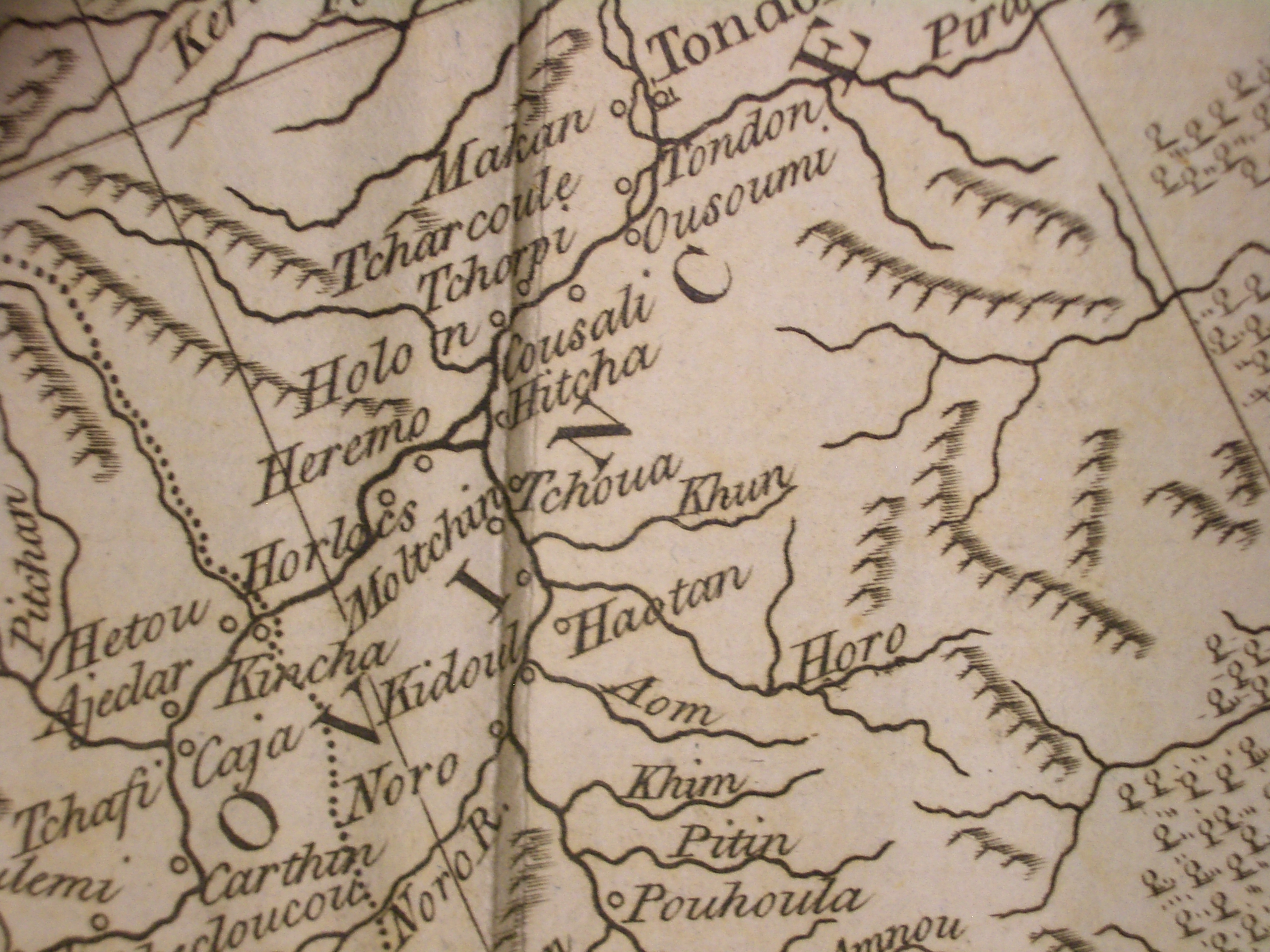
Native villages near the site of the future Khabarovsk according to an English map of 1773. The village closest to today's Khabarovsk is labeled "Hitcha". Maack's "Cape Kyrma" site (thought by B.P. Polyakov to be the site of Stepanov's Kosogorsky Ostrog) is "Heremo"

=== 17th-century Russian exploration ===
In the mid-17th century, the Amur Valley became the scene of hostilities between the Russian Cossacks, who tried to expand into the region and collect tribute from the natives, and the rising Manchu Qing dynasty, who were intent on securing the region for themselves.

=== Khabarov's Achansk ===
The Russian explorers and raiders of the 1650s set up a number of more or less fortified camps (ostrogs) on the Amur. Most of them were in use for only a few months and later destroyed. It is usually thought that the first such camp in the general area of today's Khabarovsk was the fortified winter camp named Achansk (Ачанск) or Achansky gorodok (Ачанский городок), built by the Cossacks of Yerofey Khabarov in September 1651 after they had sailed to the area from the upper Amur. The fort was named after the local tribe whom Khabarov's people called "Achans". On October 8 the fort was unsuccessfully attacked by joint forces of Achans and Duchers (who had good reasons to hate the Cossacks, due to their rather heavy-handed tribute-extraction tactics), while many Russians were away fishing. In late November, Khabarov's people undertook a three-day campaign against the local chief Zhakshur (Жакшур) (whose name is also known in a more Russian version, Zaksor (Заксор)), collecting a large amount of tribute and announcing that the locals were now subjects of the Russian Czar. A similar campaign was waged later in winter against the Ducher chief Nechiga (Нечига), farther away from Achansk.

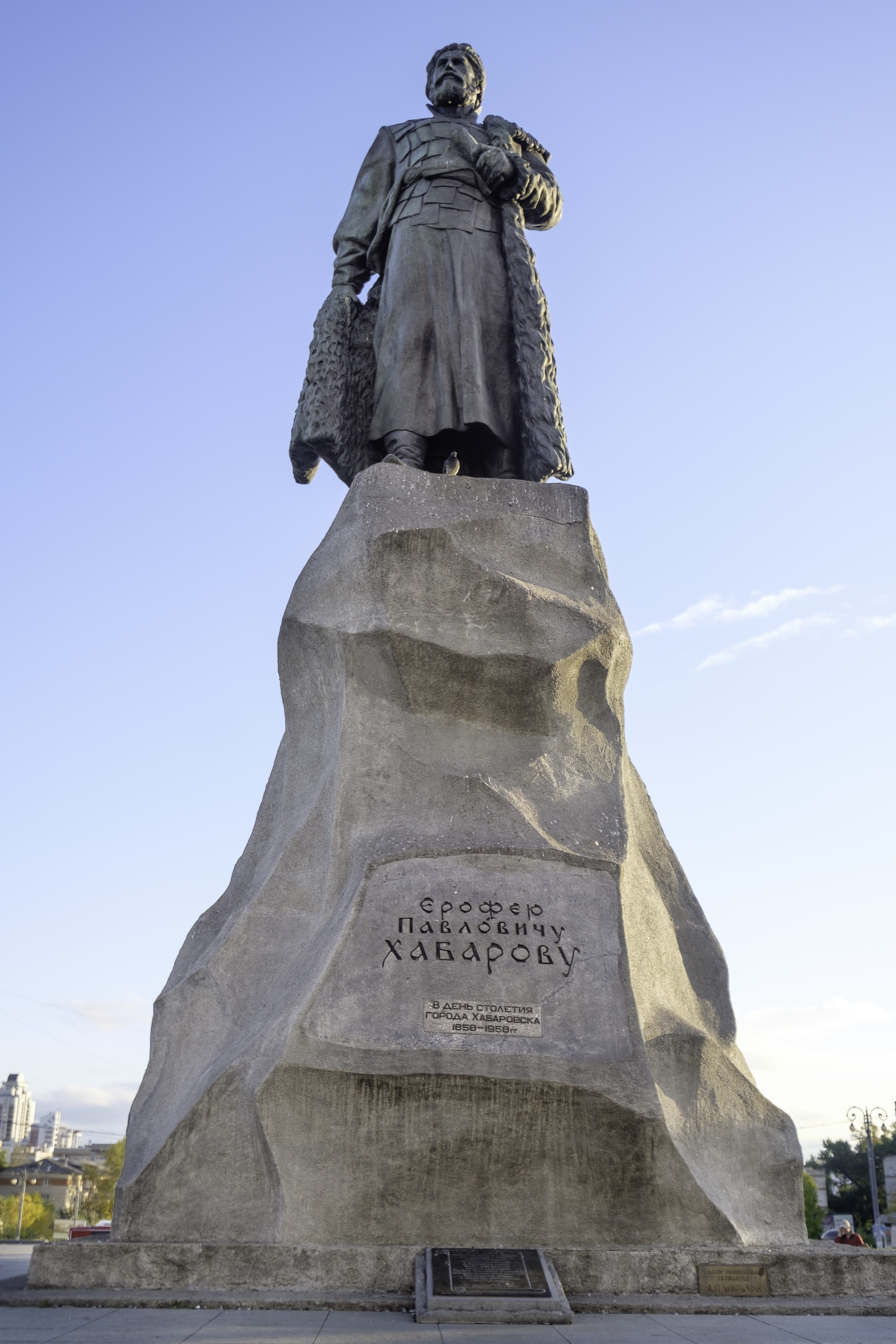
Monument to Yerofey Khabarov in Khabarovsk

On 24 or 26 March 1652, Fort Achansk was attacked by Manchu cavalry, led by Ninguta's commander Haise, reinforced by Ducher auxiliaries, but the Cossacks stood their ground in a day-long battle and even managed to seize the attackers' supply train. Once the ice on the Amur broke in the spring of 1652, Khabarov's people destroyed their fort and sailed away.

The exact location of Khabarov's Achansk has long been a subject for debate among Russian historians and geographers. A number of locations, both upstream and downstream of today's Khabarovsk, have been proposed since Richard Maack, one of the first Russian scholars to visit the region, identified Achansk in 1859 with the ruins on Cape Kyrma, which is located on the southern (Chinese) shore of the Amur, upstream of Khabarovsk. The most widely accepted point of view is probably that of Boris Polevoy, who believed that Khabarov's Achansk was located in the Nanai village later known as Odzhal-Bolon (Russian: Оджал-Болонь), located on the left bank of the Amur, closer to Amursk than to Khabarovsk. One of his arguments was that both Khabarov's Achan (sometimes also spelt by the explorer as Otshchan, Отщан), and Wuzhala (乌扎拉) of the Chinese records of the 1652 engagement are based on the name of the Nanai clan "Odzhal" (Оджал), corresponding to the 20th-century name of the village as well. (The name of the clan was also written as "Uzala", as in the name of its best-known member, Dersu Uzala).

Polevoy's view appeared to gain wide support among the Russian geographer community; petitioned by the Amur Branch of the Russian Geographical Society, the Russian Government renamed the village of Odzhal to Achan in 1977, to celebrate its connection with Khabarov's raid.

As to the Cape Kyrma ruins, thought by Maack to be the remains of Achansk, B.P. Polevoy identified them as the remains of another ostrog – namely, Kosogorsky Ostrog, where Onufriy Stepanov stayed a few years later.

=== Qing Empire ===
After the Treaty of Nerchinsk (1689) between the Tsardom of Russia and the Qing Empire, the area became an uncontested part of China for the next century and a half. Modern historical maps of the Qing period published in China mark the site of future Khabarovsk as Bólì (Chinese: 伯力). All of the middle and lower Amur region was nominally part of the Jilin Province, run first out of Ninguta and later out of Jilin City.

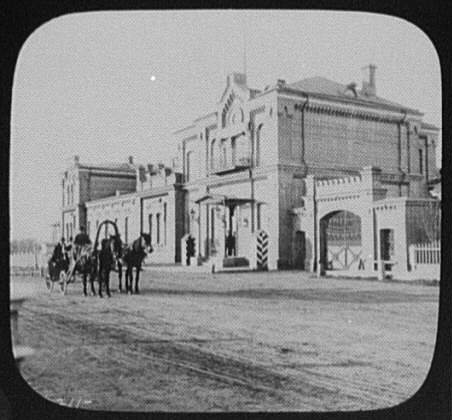
Khabarovsk – residence of the governor-general of Amur region 1895

French Jesuits who sailed along the Ussuri and the Amur Rivers in 1709 prepared the first more or less precise map of the region. According to them, the indigenous Nanai people were living on the Ussuri and on the Amur down to the mouth of the Dondon River (i.e., in the region including the site of the future Khabarovsk). These people were known to the Chinese as Yupi Dazi ("Fish skin Tartars").

=== From Khabarovka to Khabarovsk ===
The Memorial Plate to the Founders of Khabarovsk on the Nevelskoy Embankment

In 1858, the area was ceded to Russia under the Treaty of Aigun. The Russians founded the military outpost of Khabarovka (Хаба́ровка), named after Yerofey Khabarov. The post later became an important industrial center for the region. Town status was granted in 1880. In 1893, it was given its present name: Khabarovsk.

In 1894, a department of the Russian Geographical Society was formed in Khabarovsk and to found libraries, theatres and museums in the city. Since then, Khabarovsk's cultural life has flourished. Much of the local indigenous history has been well preserved in the Regional Lore Museum and Natural History Museum and in places like near the Nanai settlement of Sikachi-Alyan, where cliff drawings from more than 13,000 years ago can be found. The Khabarovsk Art Museum exhibits a rare collection of old Russian icons.

In 1916, the Khabarovsk Bridge across the Amur was completed, allowing Trans-Siberian trains to cross the river without using ferries (or temporary rail tracks over the frozen river in winter). During the Russian Civil War, Khabarovsk was occupied by Japan in September 1918.

=== Soviet era ===
The House of Commanders of the Special Red Banner Far Eastern Military District on Kalinin Street, an example of Stalinist architecture

By the Decree of the Council of Labor and Defense of December 11, 1933, the Directorate of Road Construction of Eastern Siberia and the Far East (Daldorstroy) was created in Khabarovsk, with the task of constructing strategic highways according to the list of the government of the USSR, in the regions of Eastern Siberia and the Soviet Far East. The construction plans were announced at the 17th Congress of the All-Union Communist Party (Bolsheviks), held in Moscow from January to February 1934, when the Second Five-Year Plan for the development of the Soviet Union was adopted. In accordance with it, it was planned to build a Vladivostok-Khabarovsk highway, with a hard (gravel) surface, 600 kilometers long.

After the defeat of Japan in World War II, Khabarovsk was the site of the Khabarovsk war crimes trials, in which twelve former members of the Japanese Kwantung Army and Unit 731 were put on trial for the manufacture and use of biological weapons during World War II.

Chinese Emperor Puyi, captured by Soviet troops in Manchuria, was relocated to Khabarovsk and lived there from 1945 up to 1950, when he was returned to China.

When Japan fell in September 1945 the United States reached an agreement with Stalin to build two U.S. Naval Advance Bases (Fleet Weather Centrals) in the USSR. The U.S. built one 10 miles (16 km) outside Petropavlovsk-Kamchatsky on the Kamchatka Peninsula with the code name TAMA. The other was 20 miles (32 km) outside Khabarovsk in buildings provided by the Soviets, code-named MOKO. For mail Khabarovsk was assigned U.S.Navy number 1168, FPO San Francisco. The American use of these two bases was short-lived.

On 5 November 1956, the first phase of the city tram was commissioned. The Khabarovsk television studio began broadcasting in 1960. On 1 September 1967, the Khabarovsk Institute of Physical Education, now the Far Eastern State Academy of Physical Culture, opened. On 14 January 1971, Khabarovsk was awarded the Order of October Revolution. In 1975 the first stage of the urban trolley opened. In 1976 the city hosted an international ice hockey tournament with the ball for the prize of the newspaper Sovietskaya Rossia. In 1981 the Bandy World Championship was played in the city.

=== Russian Federation ===
The new Khabarovsk House of Culture and the Energo Plaza mall behind it

Between 1989 and 2003 a memorial complex dedicated to the thousands executed during the Great Terror – a monument, a chapel and a wall of remembrance – was erected in Khabarovsk.

In 1996, Khabarovsk held its first mayoral elections. Paul D. Filippov, whose candidacy was supported by Governor Viktor Ishayev, was defeated. In 1998, reconstruction of the central square of Khabarovsk was completed. In May 2000, President of Russia, Vladimir Putin, decreed that new federal districts be formed, and Khabarovsk became the center of the Far Eastern Federal District.

In 2006, the Center for Cardiovascular Surgery, a high-tech medical center, was constructed according to a Russian national health project. In 2008, the train station was completely renovated, and the adjacent square was reconstructed to include fountains and an underground passage. In 2009, Khabarovsk hosted the EU-Russia summit. In 2010, the city hosted a meeting of the Great Circle of Ussuri Cossacks. On 3 November 2012, Khabarovsk was awarded the honorary title of "City of Military Glory".

On 9 July 2020, the governor of the region, Sergei Furgal, was arrested and flown to Moscow. The 2020 Khabarovsk Krai protests began on 11 July 2020 in support of Furgal.

In 2026, the Monument to the Victory over Japan was built. It is the tallest monument dedicated to the Surrender of Japan in Russia. Also in 2026, the Nevelskoy Embankment started getting upgrades as a plan to renew a major part of the Amur waterfront. It got extended to Sovetskaya Street in 2026. Besides simply increasing the length of the embankment, it also got a new viewing deck, new sports equipment, and a memorial to Aleksandr Vasilevsky. The southern part of the embankment, officially known as the Sportivnaya Embankment, was also expanded and renewed.

== Geography ==
The city is located 30 kilometers (19 mi) from the China–Russia border, at the confluence of the Amur and Ussuri Rivers, about 800 kilometers (500 mi) north of Vladivostok.

=== Climate ===
The Khabarovsk Cliff during winter and heavy snowfall, the Amur is frozen over

Khabarovsk experiences a monsoonal dry-winter humid continental climate (Köppen climate classification Dwb borders on Dwa, Trewartha climate classification Dcbc bordering on Dcac). Its climate is strongly continental, featuring very warm summers and bitterly cold winters.

The average annual precipitation is 696 millimetres (27.4 in), mainly concentrated in the summer. In some years, from November to March hardly any precipitation falls. The driest year was 2001 with only 381 mm (15.0 in) of precipitation and the wettest was 1981 when 1,105 mm (43.5 in) of precipitation fell. The wettest month was August 1981 with a total precipitation of 434 mm (17.1 in). Due to high summer humidity, overnight lows remain mild to warm during several months. Snowfall is common, though light, with an average maximum snow height of 16 centimeters (6.3 in). During mid winter, highs above freezing are very rare.

The city's extreme climate sees daily average high and low temperatures vary by around 50 °C (90 °F) over the course of the year. The average temperature in January is −19.2 °C (−2.6 °F) and the average for July is +21.4 °C (70.5 °F). Extremes have ranged from +36.4 °C (97.5 °F) in June 2010 to −40 °C (−40 °F) in January 2011.

Climate data for Khabarovsk (1991–2020, extremes 1878–present)
Month	Jan	Feb	Mar	Apr	May	Jun	Jul	Aug	Sep	Oct	Nov	Dec	Year
Record high °C (°F)	0.6 (33.1)	6.3 (43.3)	17.0 (62.6)	28.6 (83.5)	31.5 (88.7)	36.4 (97.5)	35.7 (96.3)	35.6 (96.1)	29.8 (85.6)	26.4 (79.5)	15.5 (59.9)	6.6 (43.9)	36.4 (97.5)
Mean daily maximum °C (°F)	−14.9 (5.2)	−9.9 (14.2)	−1.0 (30.2)	10.5 (50.9)	19.2 (66.6)	23.8 (74.8)	26.8 (80.2)	24.9 (76.8)	19.7 (67.5)	10.6 (51.1)	−2.8 (27.0)	−13.6 (7.5)	7.8 (46.0)
Daily mean °C (°F)	−19.2 (−2.6)	−14.9 (5.2)	−5.9 (21.4)	4.8 (40.6)	12.9 (55.2)	18.0 (64.4)	21.4 (70.5)	19.9 (67.8)	14.1 (57.4)	5.4 (41.7)	−6.9 (19.6)	−17.4 (0.7)	2.7 (36.9)
Mean daily minimum °C (°F)	−23.1 (−9.6)	−19.6 (−3.3)	−10.7 (12.7)	−0.1 (31.8)	7.3 (45.1)	12.8 (55.0)	16.8 (62.2)	15.7 (60.3)	9.4 (48.9)	1.0 (33.8)	−10.4 (13.3)	−20.9 (−5.6)	−1.8 (28.8)
Record low °C (°F)	−40.0 (−40.0)	−35.1 (−31.2)	−28.9 (−20.0)	−15.1 (4.8)	−3.1 (26.4)	2.2 (36.0)	6.8 (44.2)	4.9 (40.8)	−3.3 (26.1)	−15.6 (3.9)	−27.7 (−17.9)	−38.1 (−36.6)	−40.0 (−40.0)
Average precipitation mm (inches)	13 (0.5)	12 (0.5)	22 (0.9)	37 (1.5)	70 (2.8)	84 (3.3)	137 (5.4)	143 (5.6)	85 (3.3)	48 (1.9)	26 (1.0)	19 (0.7)	696 (27.4)
Average extreme snow depth cm (inches)	14 (5.5)	16 (6.3)	12 (4.7)	1 (0.4)	0 (0)	0 (0)	0 (0)	0 (0)	0 (0)	1 (0.4)	5 (2.0)	10 (3.9)	16 (6.3)
Average rainy days	0	0	1	10	16	15	15	17	15	11	2	0	102
Average snowy days	14	11	11	6	1	0	0	0	0.1	4	12	14	73
Average relative humidity (%)	75	72	68	63	65	74	79	83	78	67	69	73	72
Mean monthly sunshine hours	147	181	231	213	242	262	248	217	212	189	159	145	2,446
Source 1: Pogoda.ru.net
Source 2: NOAA (sun, 1961–1990)

== Administrative and municipal status ==
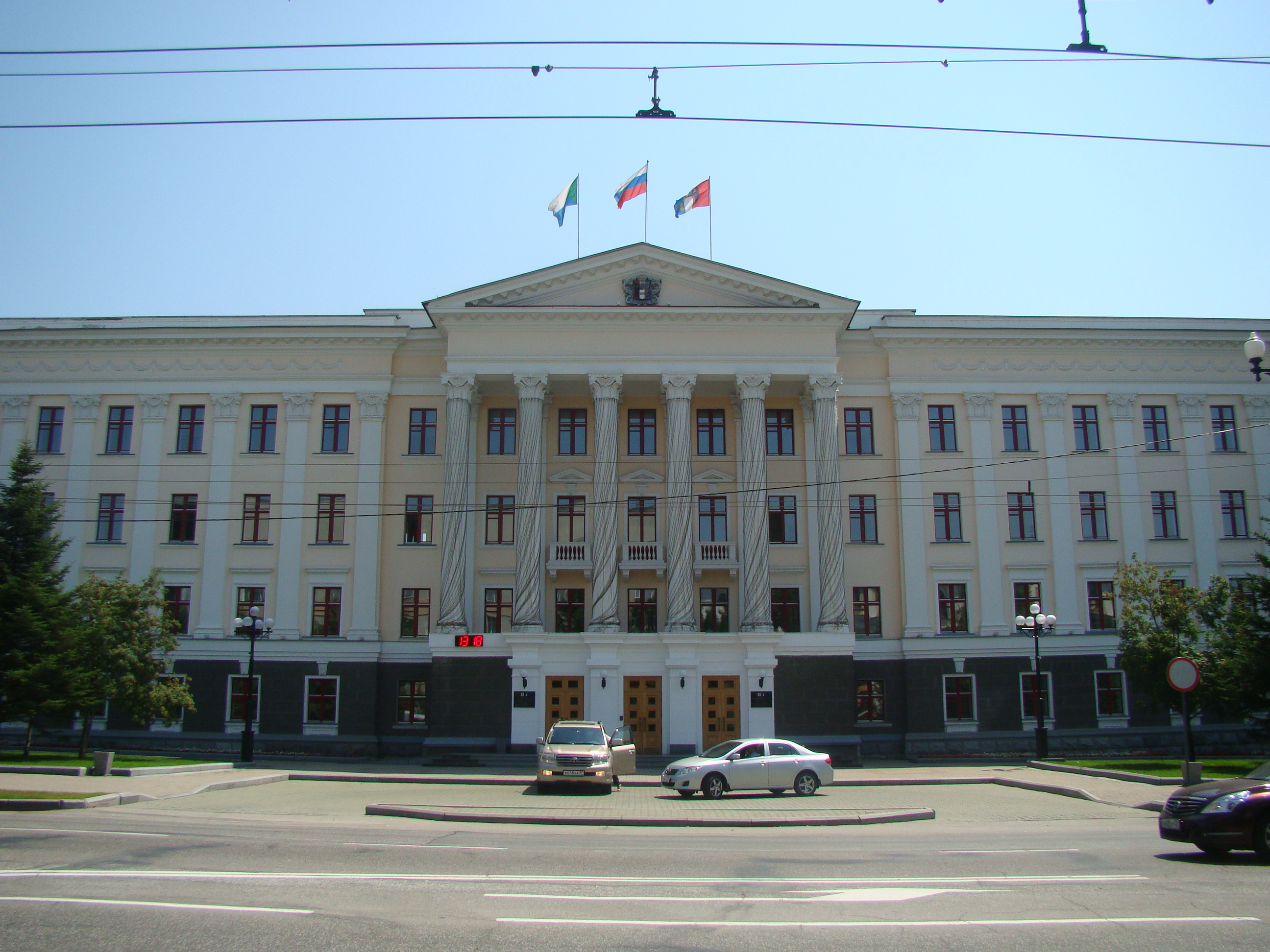
The modern Khabarovsk City Administration Building

Khabarovsk is the administrative center of the krai and, within the framework of administrative divisions, it also serves as the administrative center of Khabarovsky District, even though it is not a part of it. As an administrative division, it is incorporated separately as the city of krai significance of Khabarovsk—an administrative unit with the status equal to that of the districts. As a municipal division, the city of krai significance of Khabarovsk is incorporated as Khabarovsk Urban Okrug.

== Demographics ==
Historical population
Year	Pop.	±%
1897	14,971	—
1926	49,704	+232.0%
1939	199,172	+300.7%
1959	322,744	+62.0%
1970	435,962	+35.1%
1979	527,848	+21.1%
1989	600,623	+13.8%
2002	583,072	−2.9%
2010	577,441	−1.0%
2021	617,441	+6.9%
Source: Census data

Ethnic composition (2010):

- Russians – 92.6%
- Ukrainians – 1.8%
- Koreans – 1.1%
- Chinese – 0.6%
- Tatars – 0.5%
- Uzbeks – 0.5%
- Others – 2.9%
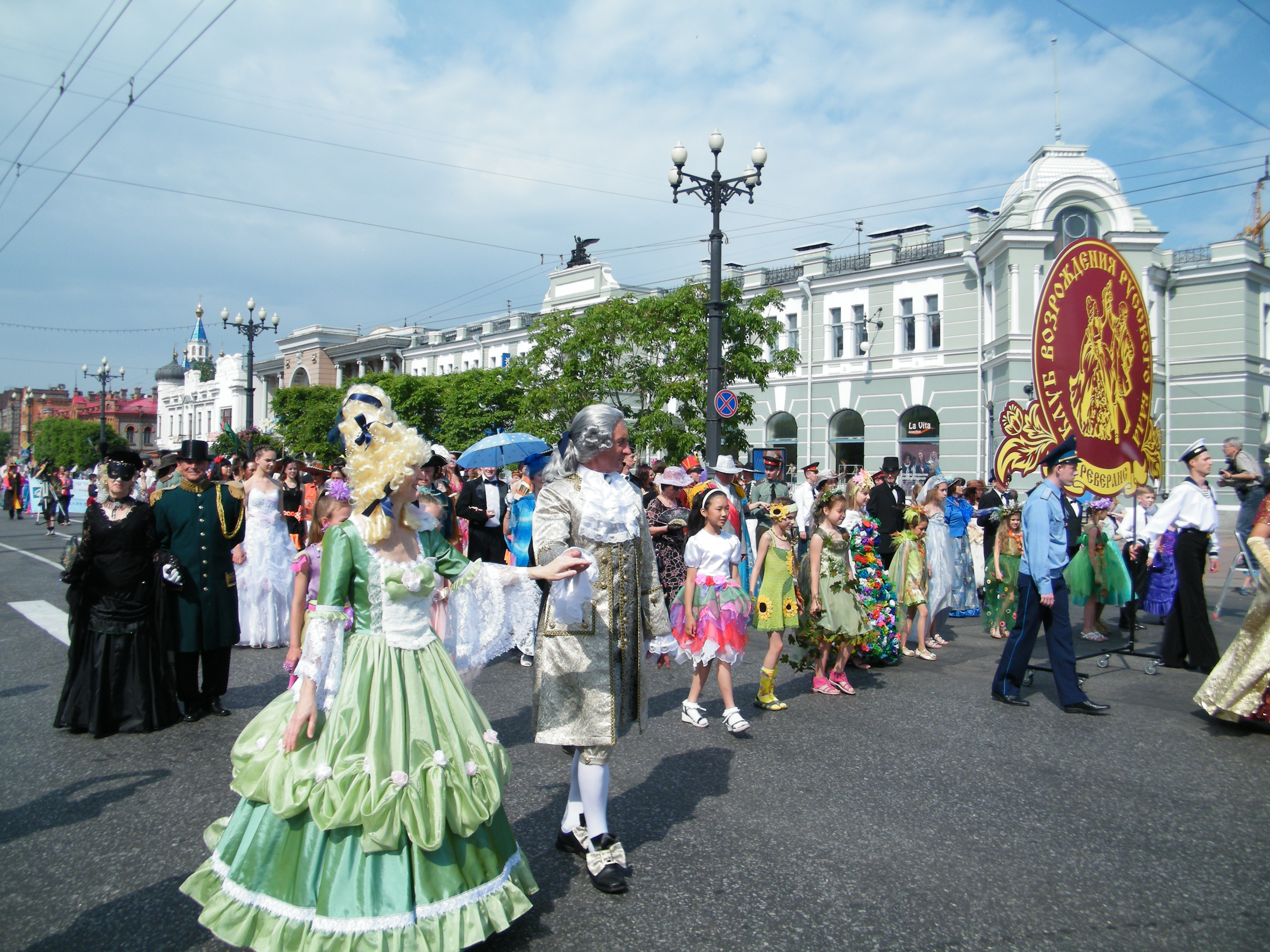
  People on Muravyov-Amursky street celebrating the city's 154th birthday (2012)

== Economy ==
Primary industries include iron processing, steel milling, Khabarovsk shipyard, Daldizel, machinery, petroleum refining, flour milling, pharmaceutical industry, meatpacking and manufacturing of various types of heavy and light machinery.

A high-speed international fiber-optic cable connects the city of Khabarovsk with the city of Fuyuan in China.

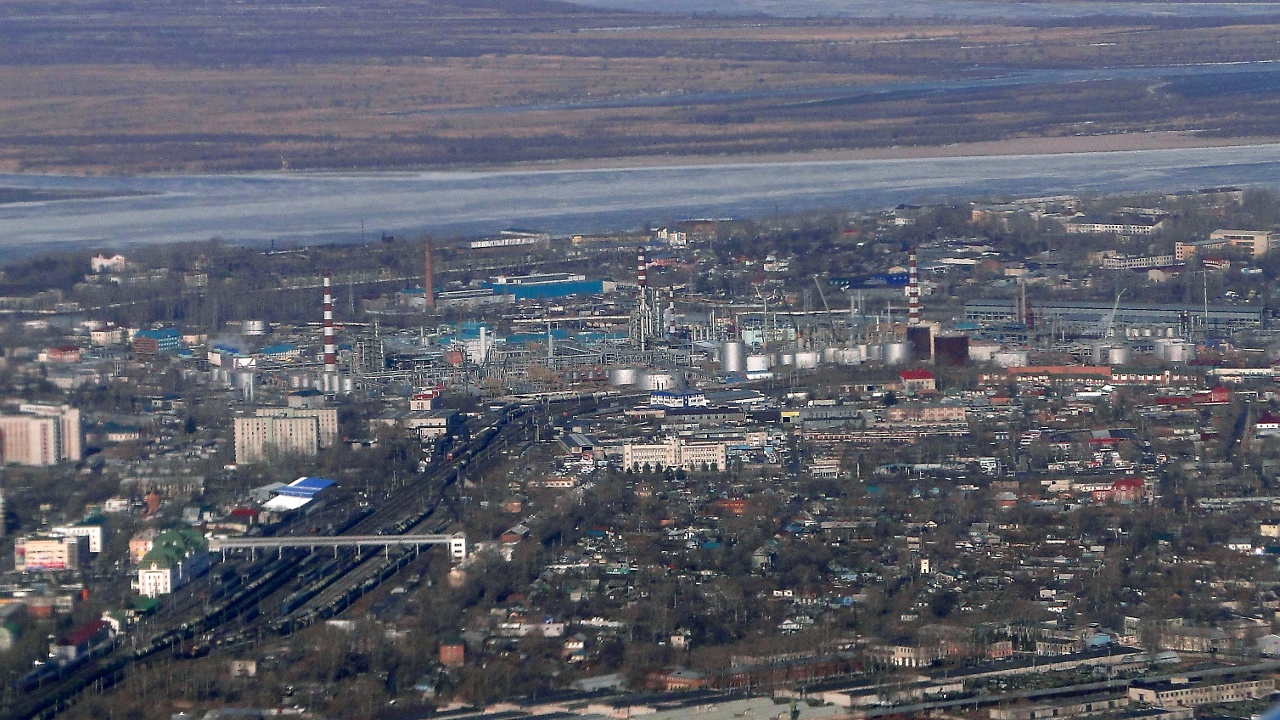
The Khabarovsk Oil Refinery

== Cityscape ==
The Khabarovsk historic city centre's architecture is predominately in the neoclassical style, with some stalinist and modern buildings. Many historic buildings were renovated to keep their historic look. The Khabarovsk historic city centre is considered to comprise the Tsentralny District and a part of the Kirovsky District. It includes the following streets:

- Boulevards: Ussuriysky, Amursky. They were built atop of the Cherdymovka and Plyusninka rivers.
- Streets: Muravyova-Amurskogo, Shevchenko, Turgeneva, Serysheva, Komsomolskaya, Naberezhnaya, Istomina, Kalinina, Zaparina, Dzerzhinskogo, Volochayevskaya, Sheronova, Gogolya, Kim Yu Chena, Pushkina, Frunze, Dzhambula, Lva Tolstogo, Im. Svyatitelya Innokentiya, Kavkazskaya
- Ways: Kavkazsky, Bratsky, Dyachenko, Arsenyeva
- Embankments: im. Admirala Nevelskogo

Most of the city resides in khrushchevkas and brezhnevkas all around the city. Some of them are built in the historic city centre. Modern apartments are actively being built, mostly in previously underpopulated parts of the city, though some are built in the city centre.

Khabarovsk
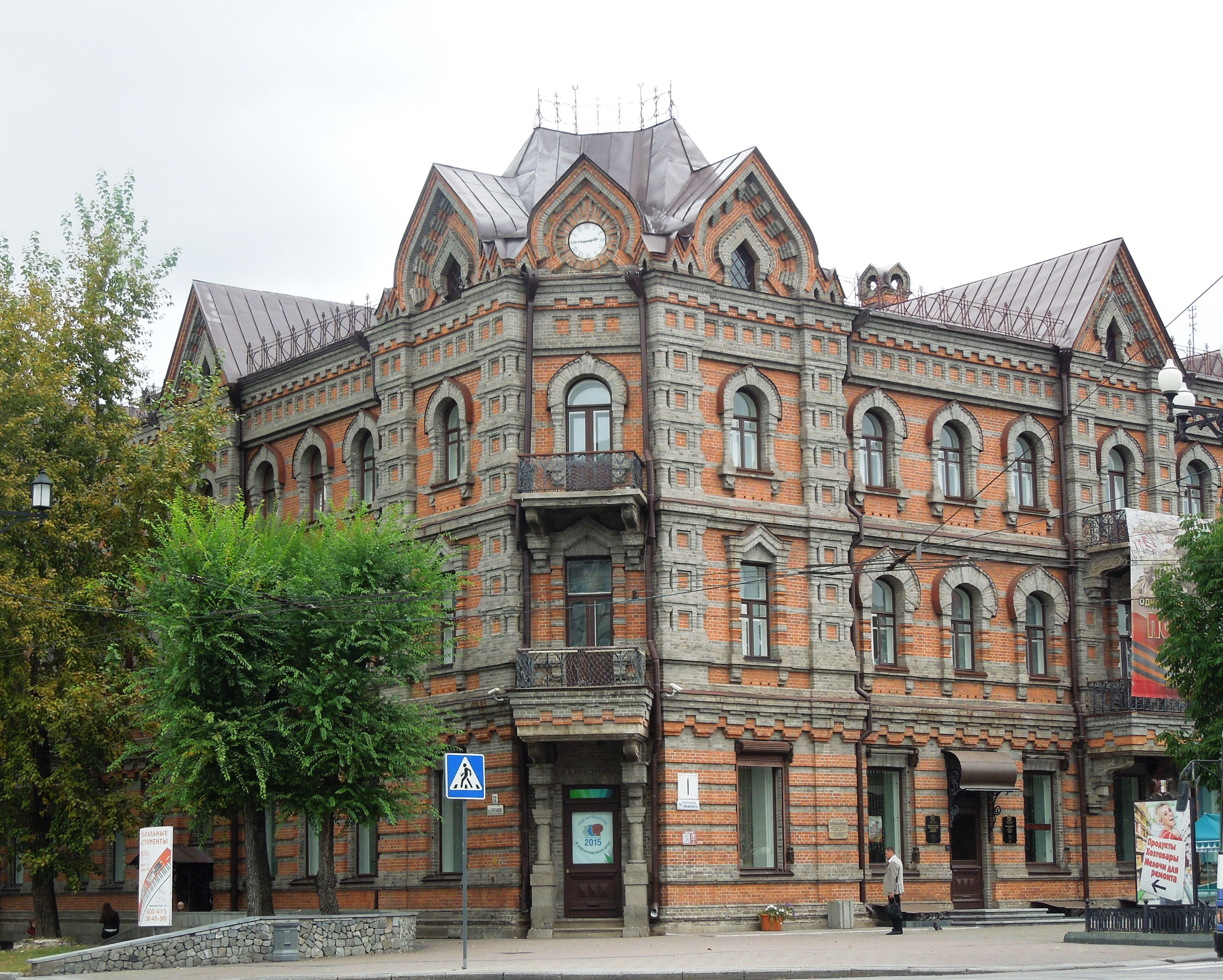
The Plyusnin Income House (Far Eastern State Scientific Library)

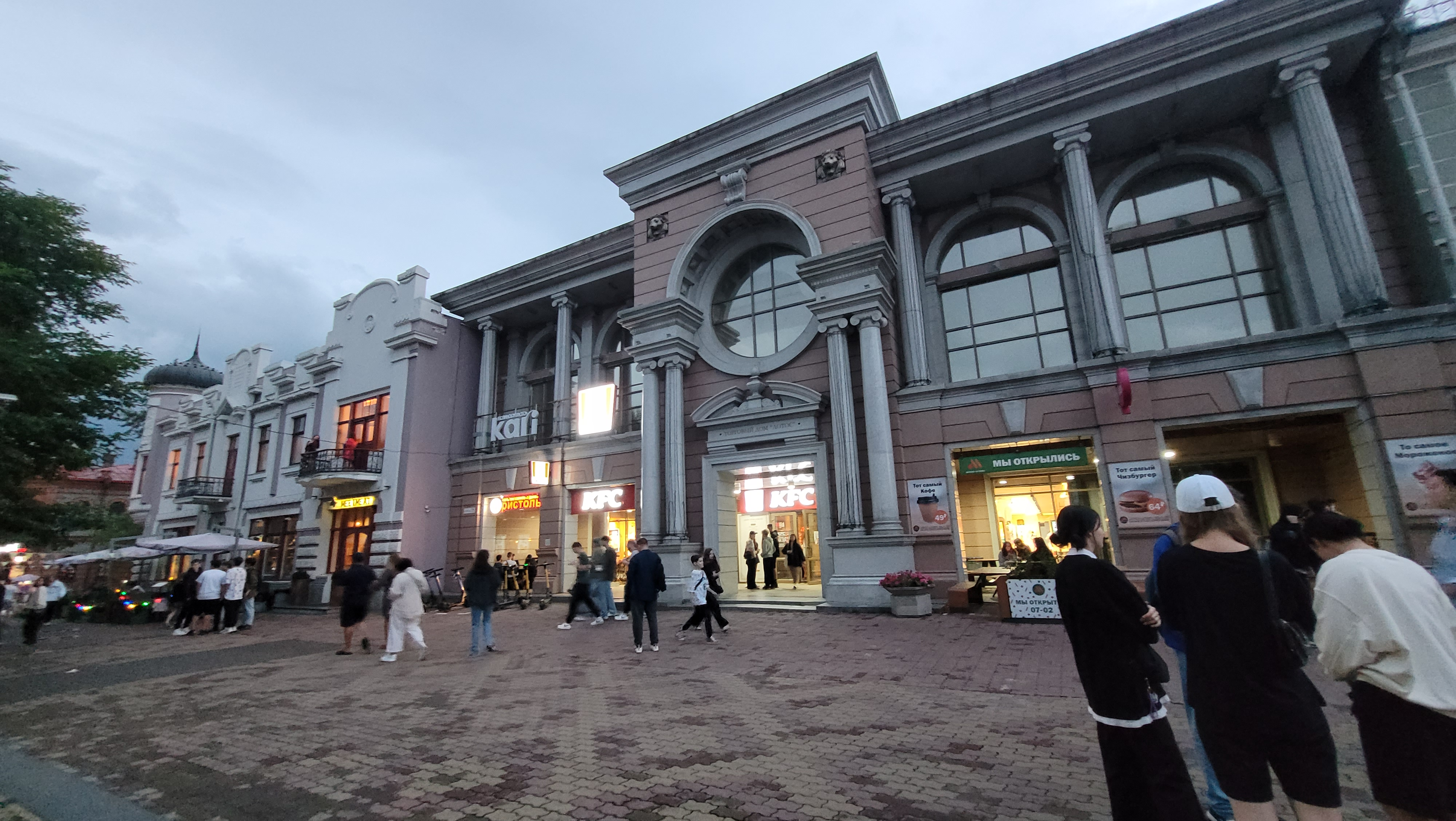
The Takauchi Income House (left) and "Lotos" Trade House (centre/right)

A high-rise on 53A Frunze St.

High-rises in Khabarovsk

The Tabolov & Bitarov Income House

Soviet buildings on Ussuriyusky Boulevard

== Transportation ==
A trolleybus near the Khabarovsk Train Station

Amur waterfront (officially known as the Nevelskoy Embankment). A bike lane was constructed in 2018.

The city is a principal railway center located along the Trans-Siberian Railway; the rail distance from Khabarovsk railway station to Moscow is 8,523 kilometres (5,296 mi). A suburban train system also operates in Khabarovsk, going as far as Obluchye to the west and Vyazemsky to the east. It has around 50 stations in total, and the most populous location the Khabarovsk Suburban Train goes to is Birobidzhan. The Far East Children's Railway also operates in the city and has 4 stops.

Khabarovsk is served by the Khabarovsk Novy Airport with international flights to East Asia, Southeast Asia, European Russia, and Central Asia.

Road links include the Trans-Siberian Highway (M58 and M60 Highways), and water transport links are provided by the Amur River and Ussuri River.

The Khabarovsk public transport includes 3 tram routes, 5 trolleybus routes and 46 bus routes.

In 2021, the construction of a paid high-speed bypass of the city was completed.

== Education ==
There are the following institutions of higher education in Khabarovsk:

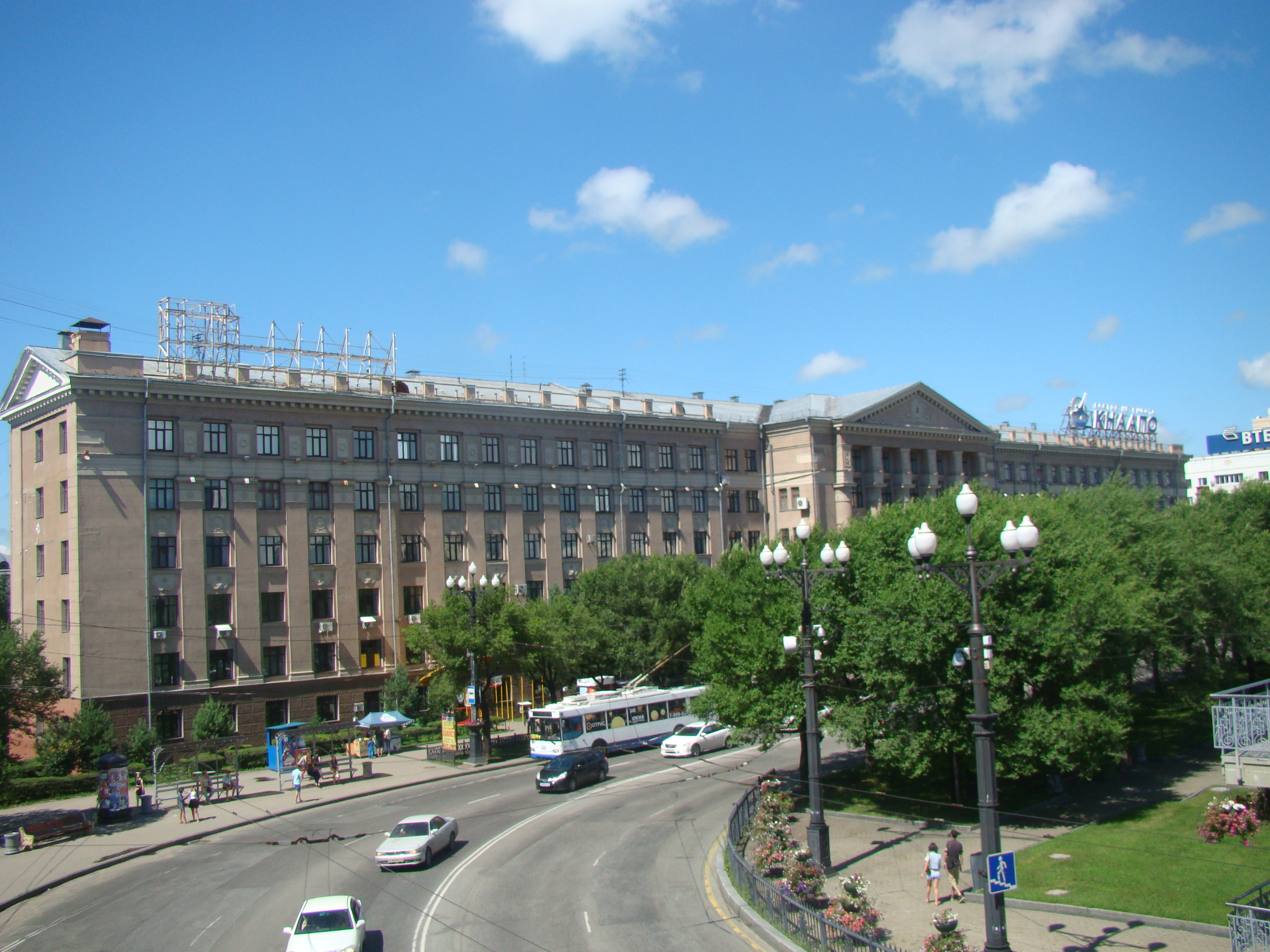
The Far Eastern State Medical University. It is situated near Lenin Square, opposite the Khabarovsk Krai government building.

- Pacific National University (former Khabarovsk State University of Technology or Polytechnic Institute)
- Far Eastern State University of Humanities (former Khabarovsk State Teachers Training University)
- Far Eastern State Medical University
- Khabarovsk State Academy of Economics and Law
- Far Eastern State Transport University
- Far Eastern Academy of Public Service
- Far Eastern State Physical Education University
- Khabarovsk State Institute of Arts and Culture

Khabarovsk also has 102 kindergartens (15 private) and 74 schools (4 private).

== Culture ==
Khabarovsk has many cultural facilities, including the following:

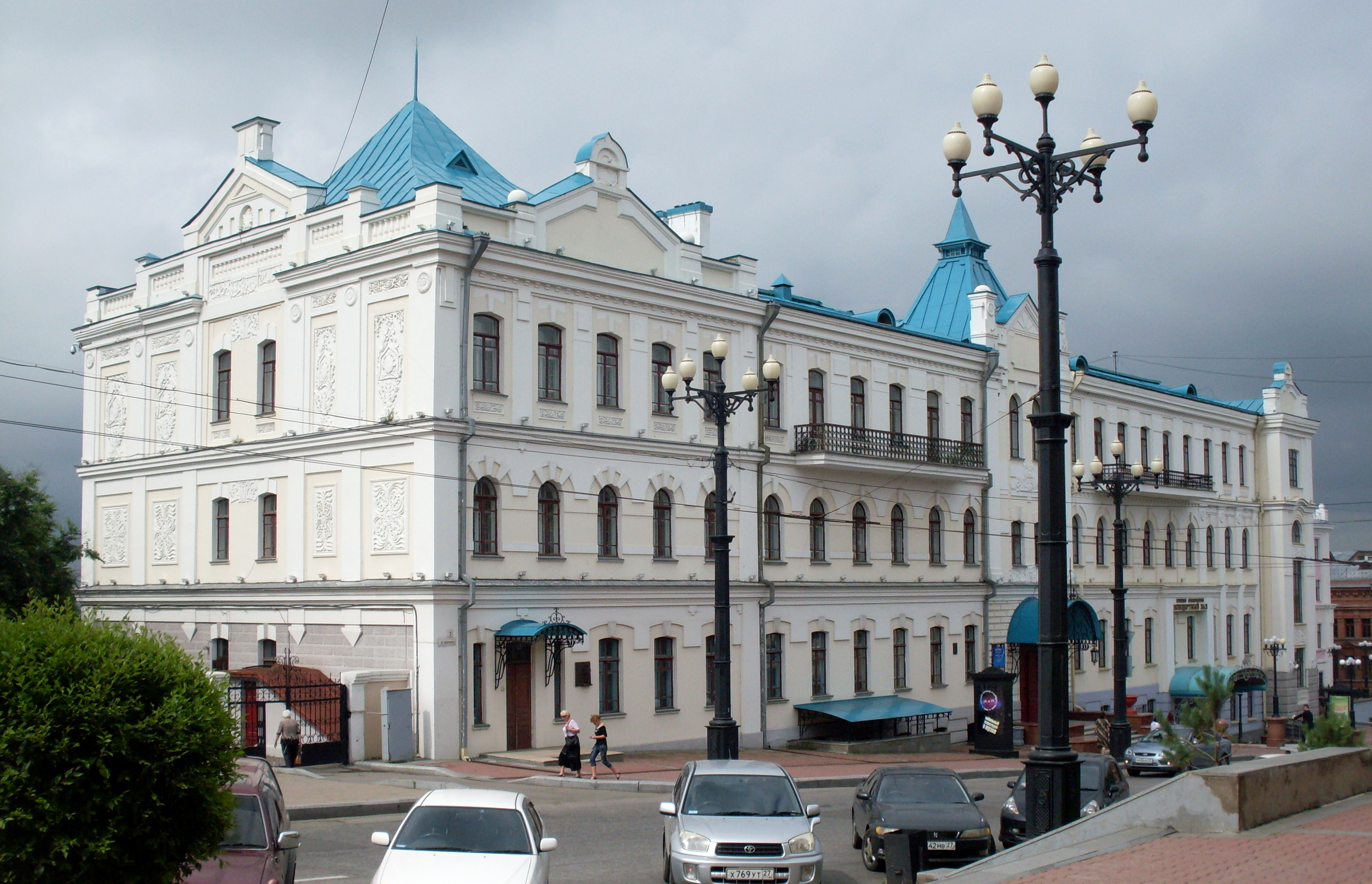
The Khabarovsk Philarmonic

- The Khabarovsk Regional Museum
- The Military History Museum of the Far Eastern Military District
- The Khabarovsk Palace of Culture (and the Khabarovsk City Museum located in it)
- The Khabarovsk Philarmonic
- The Khabarovsk Drama Theatre
- The Khabarovsk Regional Music Theatre (burnt down)

== Tourism ==
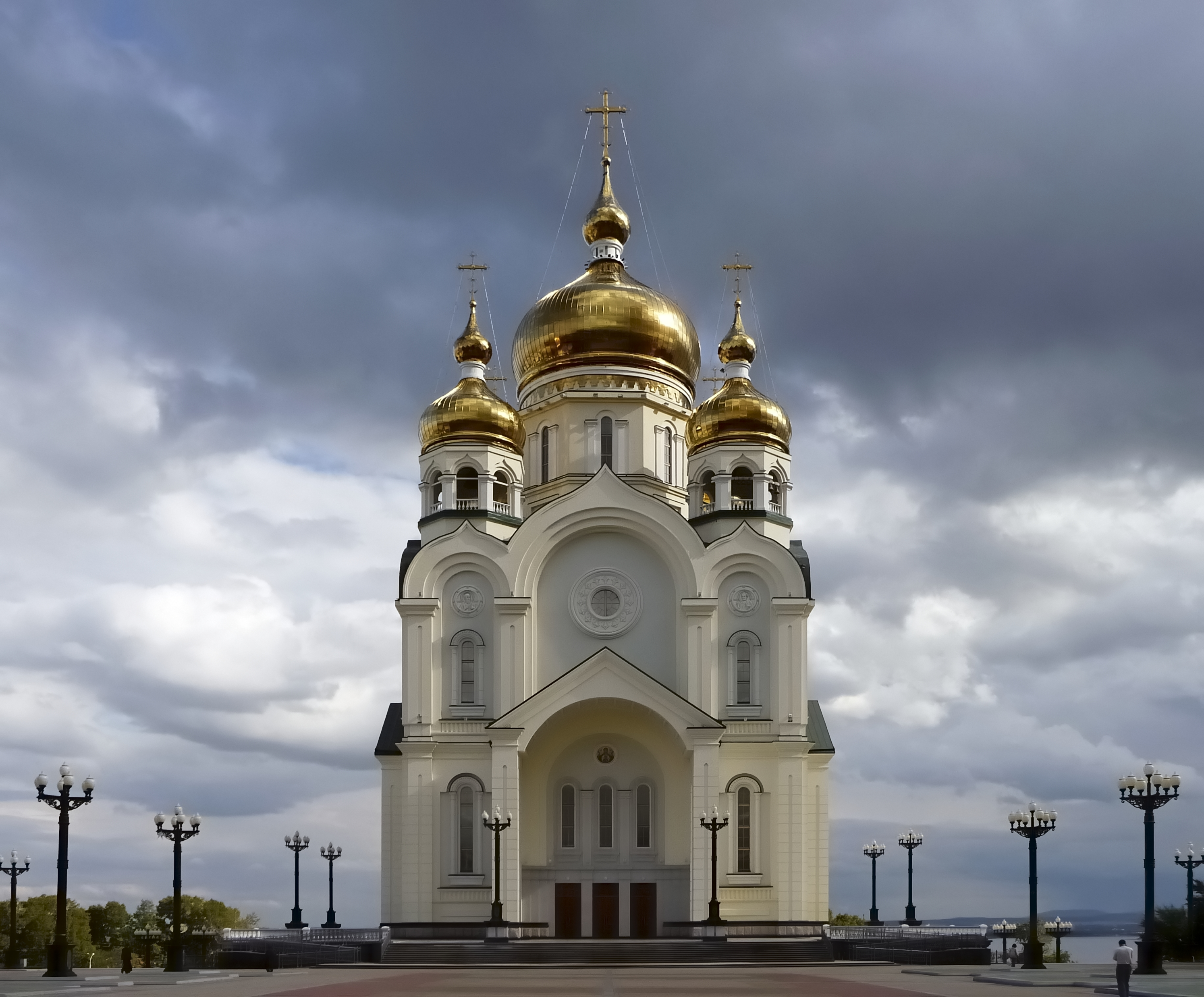
The Trasfiguration Cathedral

A key street in Khabarovsk is the broad Amursky Boulevard with its many shops and a local market. The city's five districts stretch for 45 kilometers (28 mi) along the Amur River. The similar boulevard – Ussuryisky is located between the two main streets Muravyov-Amursky and Lenin street and runs to the city ponds (Gorodskie Prudi) with the sport complex Platinum Arena. The lakes are famous for their fountains with the light show. The Military History Museum of the Far Eastern Military District is located in the city, the only such museum in the Russian Far East.

There is a walking tour from Lenin Square to the Khabarovsk Cliff on the Amur via Muravyov-Amursky Street, where visitors can find traditional Russian restaurants and shops with souvenirs. There are a number of night clubs and pubs in this area.

In winter, ice sculptures are on display in city squares and parks. Artists come from as far as Harbin in China.

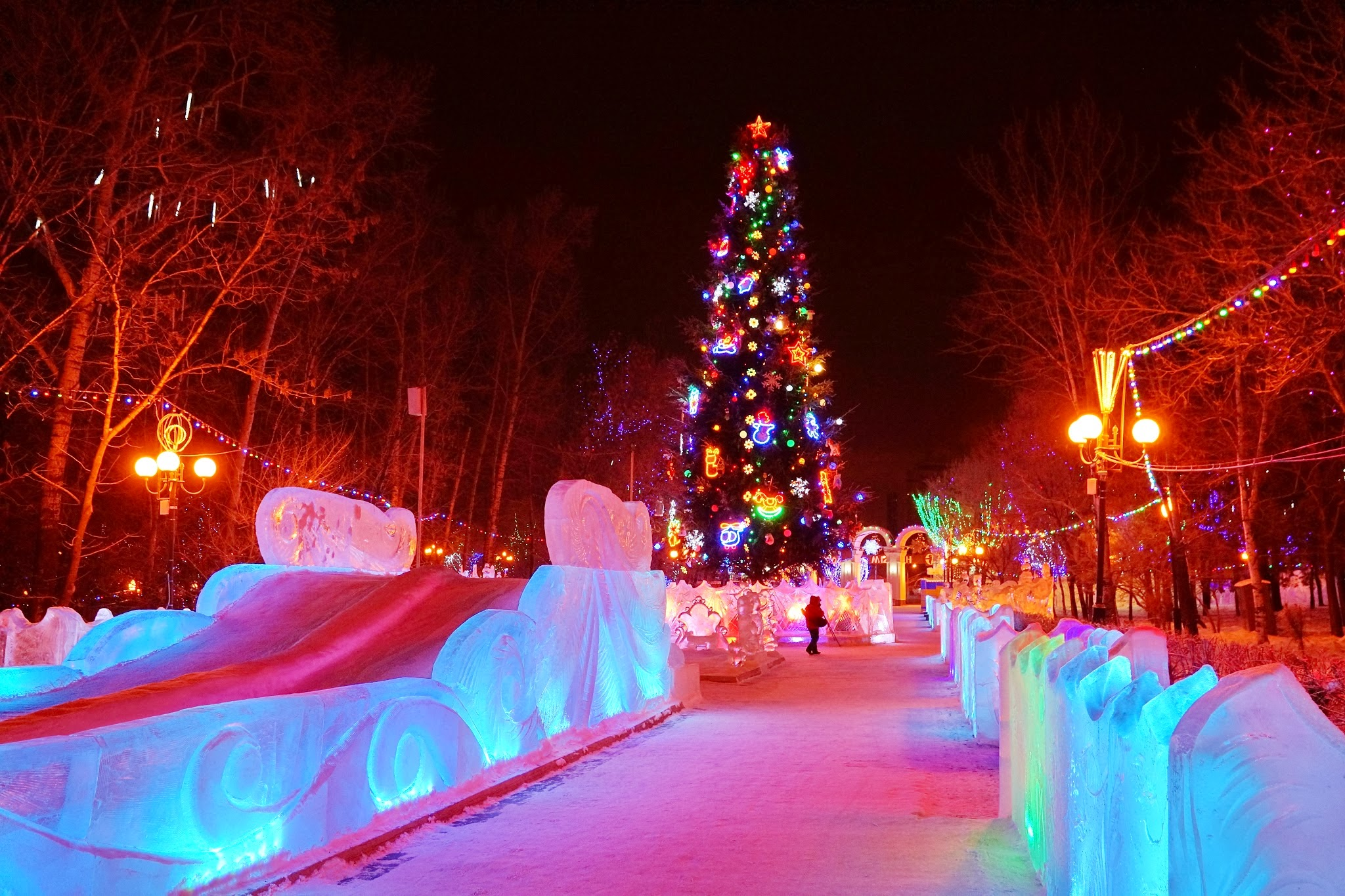
Ice sculptures at Christmas on the central square of Khabarovsk

Unlike Vladivostok, the city has never been closed to foreigners, despite it being the headquarters of the Far East Military District, and retains its historically international flavor. Once the capital of the Soviet Far East (from 1926 to 1938). Since the demise of the Soviet Union, it has experienced an increased Asian presence. It is estimated that over one million Chinese travel to and through Khabarovsk yearly, and foreign investment by Japanese and Korean corporations have grown in recent years. The city has a multi-story shopping mall and about a dozen hotels.

Aleksandr Fedosov, the Khabarovsk Krai Minister of Culture, estimates that the city became more attractive to tourists following the 2015 Bandy World Championship.

Khabarovsk is the closest major city to Birobidzhan, which is the administrative center of the Jewish Autonomous Oblast, Russia, located on the Trans-Siberian Railway, close to the border with China. The Jewish Autonomous Oblast is a federal subject of Russia in the Russian Far East, bordering Khabarovsk Krai and Amur Oblast in Russia and Heilongjiang province in China. Its administrative center is the town of Birobidzhan, and it is the only region in the world in which Yiddish is the official language. Khabarovsk provides the closest major airport to Birobidzhan, which is Khabarovsk Novy Airport (KHV / UHHH), 198 km from the center of Birobidzhan.

== Military ==
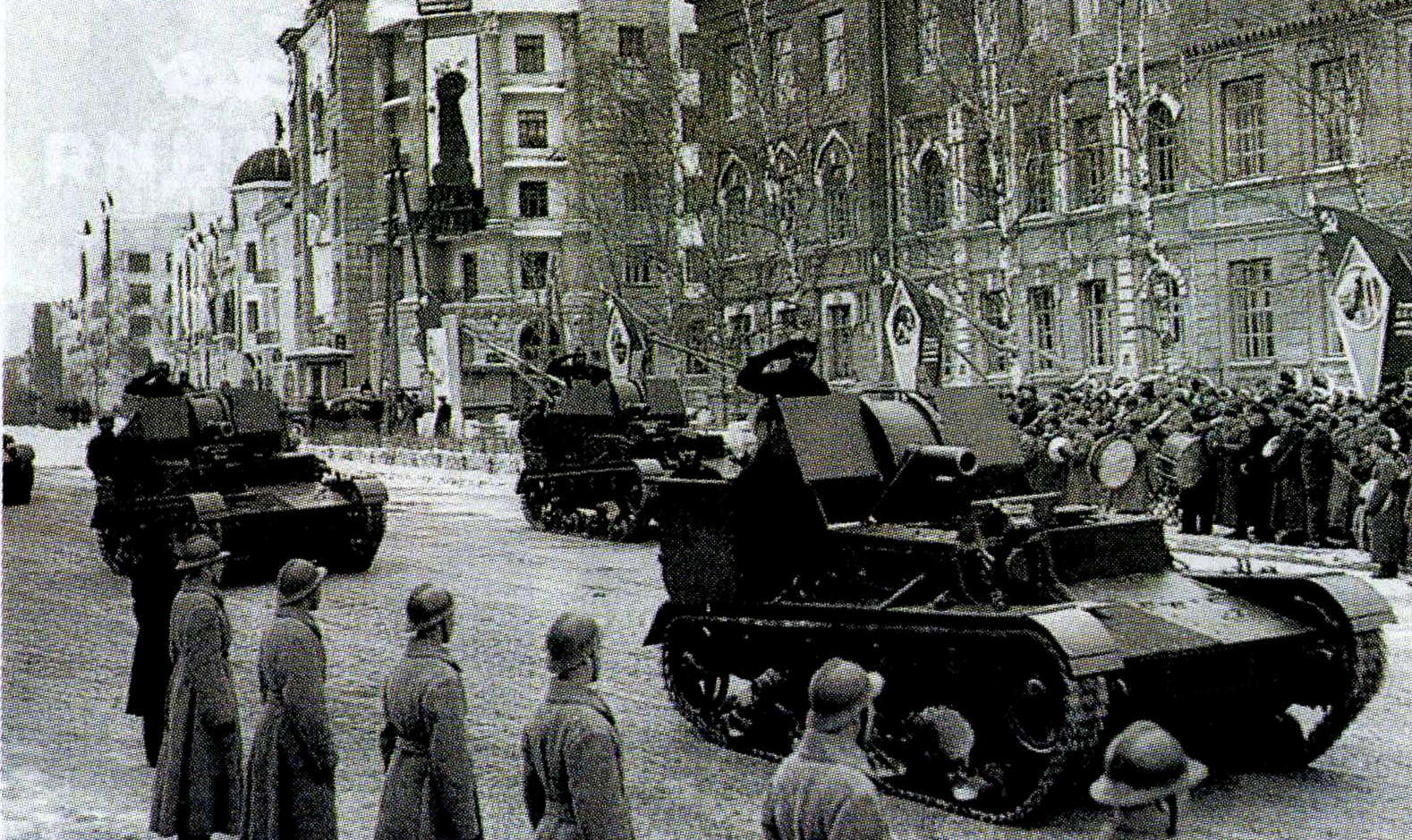
A parade in 1936 in Khabarovsk. SU-5 self-propelled artillery vehicles can be seen in the foreground

The headquarters of the Russian Ground Forces's Eastern Military District is located at 15 Serysheva Street. The district was preceded by the Far Eastern Military District, which was located in the same location. The following component units of the district are stationed in the city:

- 104th Chuj Headquarters Brigade
- Honour Guard Company of the Khabarovsk Garrison
- 17th Independent Electronic Warfare Brigade
- A T-90 tank on parade in Khabarovsk
  118th Independent Pontoon-Bridge Railway Battalion
- 392nd Pacific Training Center for Junior Specialists
- 11th Air and Air Defence Forces Army
- Military Band of the Eastern Military District

All 5 of these units make up the Khabarovsk Garrison. The Russian Navy's Pacific Fleet maintains a presence in the city as well. There is also an airbase located 3 km (1.9 mi) to the east of the city. The main public relations asset for the military in the city is the Military History Museum of the Far Eastern Military District and the district military band.

== Sports ==
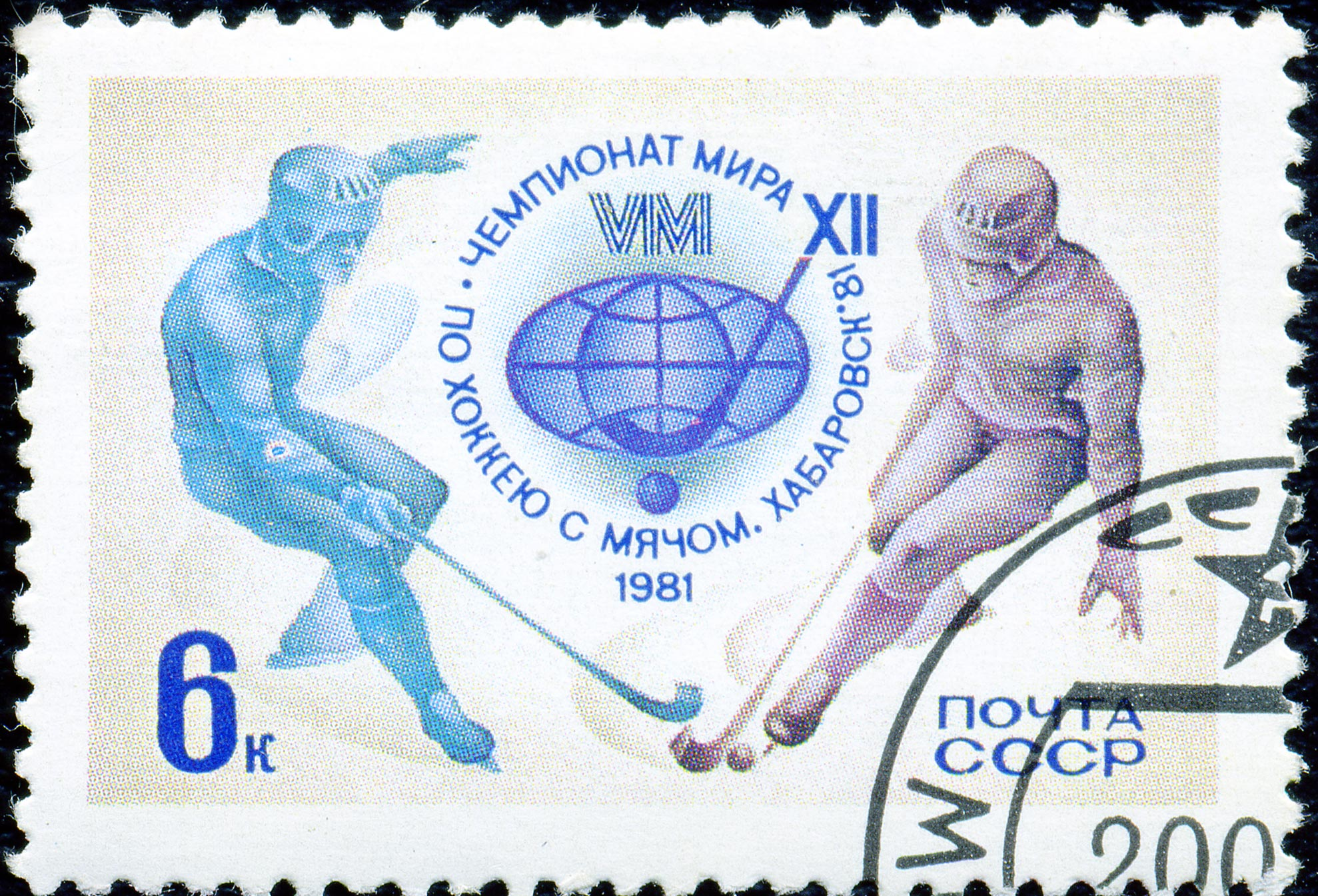
Stamp depicting 1981 Bandy World Championship in Khabarovsk

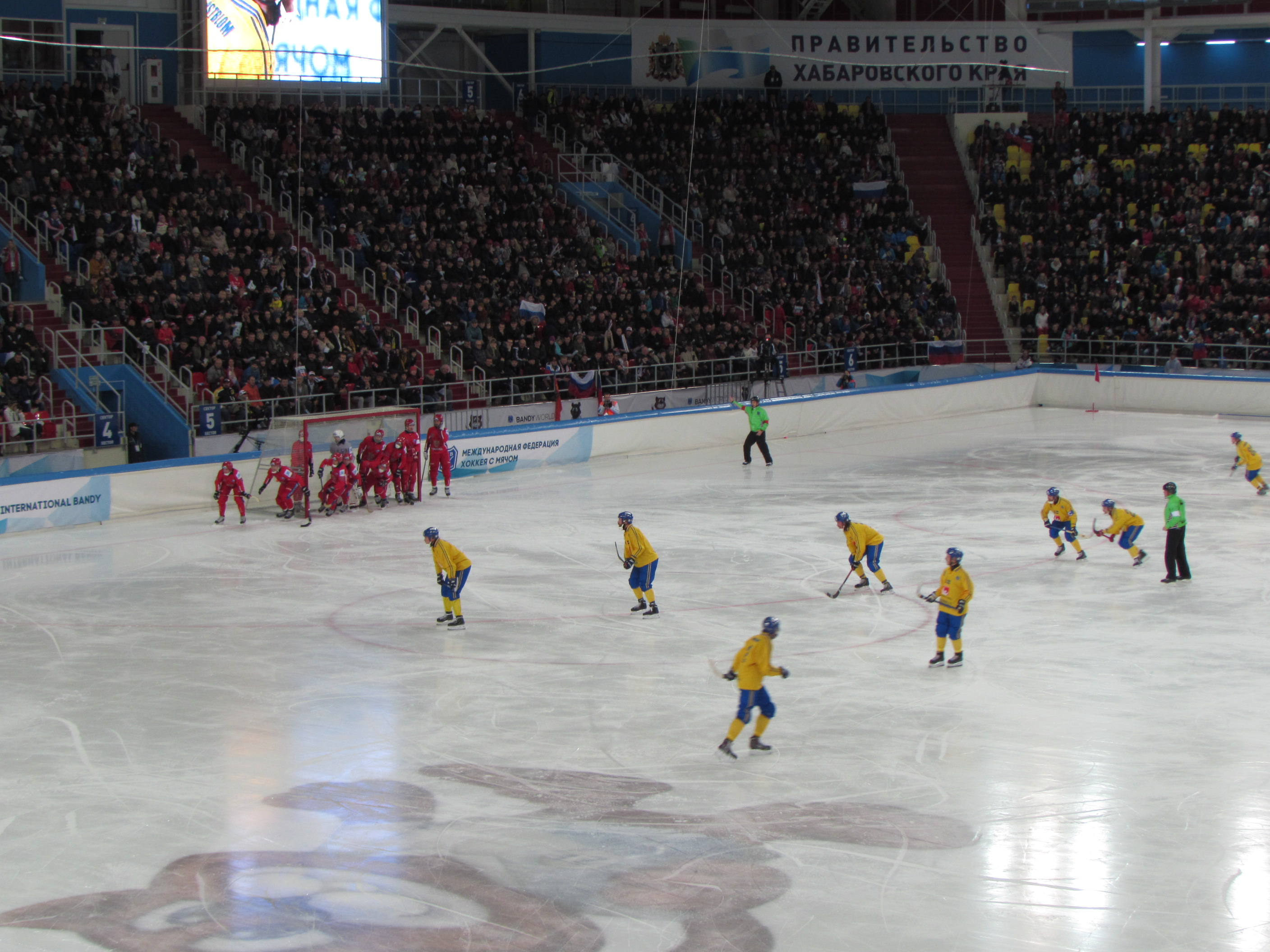
A corner during the final of the 2015 Bandy World Championship

- Amur Khabarovsk, a professional ice hockey club of the international Kontinental Hockey League and plays its home games at the Platinum Arena. It used to be the furthest team from the European-based teams in the league until Admiral Vladivostok joined the KHL in 2013 as an expansion team.
- FC SKA-Khabarovsk, a professional association football team playing in the Russian First League, the second tier of Russian association football.
- SKA-Neftyanik, a professional bandy club which plays in the top-tier Russian Bandy Super League at its own indoor venue Arena Yerofey. It is both the easternmost and southernmost team in the top division. In the 2016–17 season the club became Russian champion for the first time. As of 2019 the team has won the title three years in a row.

=== International events ===
The city was a host to the 1981 Bandy World Championship. It also hosted the 2015 Bandy World Championship, which was visited by Prime Minister Dmitry Medvedev. Khabarovsk organised the 2018 tournament as well, but not Division B that time around, which was held in Chinese Harbin. The event was named by the Federal Agency for Tourism as one of the best 200 events of the year.

== Administrative division ==
Districts of Khabarovsk. From north to south: Krasnoflotsky, Zheleznodorozhny, Kirovsky, Tsentralny, Industrialny

The city of Khabarovsk is divided into 5 administrative districts:

№	District name	English meaning	Population	Size	Date of creation
1	Tsentralny	Central	92 797	53 sq km	November 3, 1937
2	Kirovsky	of Kirov	54 966	38 sq km	May 21, 1936
3	Industrialny	Industrial	225 996	128 sq km	May 21, 1936
4	Zheleznodorozhny	Railway	154 182	99 sq km	December 28, 1936
5	Krasnoflotsky	of the Red Fleet	87 659	71 sq km	October 3, 1945

Furthermore, the city is divided into unofficial microdistricts. There is no official list of microdistricts, and some can be considered real by some Khabarovsk residents to exist, while some are more questionable. For example, Depo №2 or Aviagorodok are often agreed to be real microdistricts, while Batuyevka (a small area near the Khabarovsk railway station mainly known for being a big commercial area, named after Batyevskaya Vetka St.) is rarely called a microdistrict.

Microdistricts of Khabarovsk
№	Microdistrict name	English meaning	Approximate location
1	Baza KAF	RAAF (Red Army Amur Flotilla) Base	In the north of the city Krasnoflotsky district
2	Severny Mikrorayon	Northern Microdistrict	Krasnoflotsky District
3	Topograf	Topograph	North of Kirovsky District
4	Depo №2	Depot №2	North of the city Krasnoflotsky District
5	Neftyanik	"Oiler" (the microdistrict is named after the Neftyanik stadium, former home of bandy club SKA-Neftyanik.)	Kirovsky District
6	38-ya Shkola	School no.38	Kirovsky District Centered around the "Arsenalets" Sports Complex
7	Bolshaya Vyazemskaya	~	Zheleznodorozhny District
8	Aviagorodok	Aviation Town	Zheleznodorozhny District Near the Khabarovsk Novy Airport
9	Ovoschesovkhoz	Vegetable communal farm	Zheleznodorozhny District
10	Orekhovaya sopka	lit. "Nut Hill" (named after a recent real estate development)	Zheleznodorozhny District
11	Vtoroy Khabarovsk	lit. "Second Khabarovsk" (named after the Khabarovsk-2 train station)	Zheleznodorozhny District
12	Kvartal DOS	Officers' Quarter	Zheneznodorozhny District
13	im. Gorkogo	Settlement of Gorky	Zheneznodorozhny District
14	Energomash	Energomash (named after Energomash, a Russian rocket engine manufacturer)	Tsentralny District, centered around the City Palace of Culture
15	Volochayevsky Gorodok	Volochayev Town	Tsentralny District
16	Stroitel	Builder	Industrialny District
17	Flegontova	of Flegontov	Industrialny District. Centered around Arena Yerofey
18	19-ya shkola	School no.19	Industrialny District
19	Krasnaya Rechka	Red River	Industrialny District. Southernmost microdistrict in Khabarovsk
20	5-ya Ploschadka	it. "Fifth Field" . After the creation of the Khabarovsk Roofing Plant, the 5th field, by the planning, went to residential housing.	Industrialny District
21	Yuzhny Mikrorayon	Southern Microdistrict	Industrialny District
22	Polyarnaya	Polar	Krasnoflotsky District. Northernmost microdistrict in Khabarovsk

On the 21st of May, 1936, the city of Khabarovsk was divided into 2 districts - Stalinsky and Kirovsky. On the 3rd of November 1937, the Tsentralny district of Khabarovsk was formed by the Far Eastern Executive Comitee. The Zheleznodorozhny District was created on the 28th of December 1938, and the Krasnoflotsky District on the 15th of September, 1945. On the 10th of November, 1961, the Stalinsky District was renamed to Industrialny.

== Notable people ==
- Arman Tsarukyan, professional mixed martial artist
- Kristina Akheeva, actress and model
- Oleksandr Aliyev, association football player
- Nikita Balakhontsev, association football player
- Sergei Bodrov, filmmaker
- Evgeny Grachev, ice hockey player
- Mikhail Grigorenko, ice hockey player
- Alexandra Ivanovskaya, 2005 Miss Russia winner
- Denis Kenzo, music producer
- Ivan Koumaev, dancer
- Alexander Mogilny, ice hockey player
- Evgeni Plushenko, Olympic figure skater
- Vita Sidorkina, model
- Ivan Skobrev, speed skater
- Andrei Tchmil, professional cyclist
- Evgeny Tsaregorodtsev, professional ice hockey player
- Daria Usacheva, figure skater
- Vladimir Volegov, painter
- Andrey Zamkovoy, boxer
- Efim Zelmanov, mathematician
- Artem Zub, ice hockey player

== Twin towns – sister cities ==
Khabarovsk is twinned with:

- Niigata, Japan (1965)
- Portland, United States (1988)
- Victoria, Canada (1990) As of March 4, 2022, Victoria City Council voted to suspend the city's relationship with Khabarovsk as a result of the 2022 Russian invasion of Ukraine.
- Harbin, China (1993)
- Bucheon, South Korea (2002)
- Sanya, China (2011)

== Awards ==
- Khabarovsk placed first in different categories of "Most Developed and Comfortable City of Russia" in 2006, 2008 and 2009.
- In 2010, Khabarovsk won the second place in the Forbes list of most suitable cities for private business in Russia. First place went to Krasnodar.

== See also ==
- Bolshoy Ussuriysky Island
- 2020 Khabarovsk Krai protests
- Khabarovsk Campaign
- Monument to the Victory over Japan
- Trams in Khabarovsk
