= Jaxa (state) =

17th century microstate in North Asia

Jaxa Jaksa
- 1665–1674
- Coat of arms

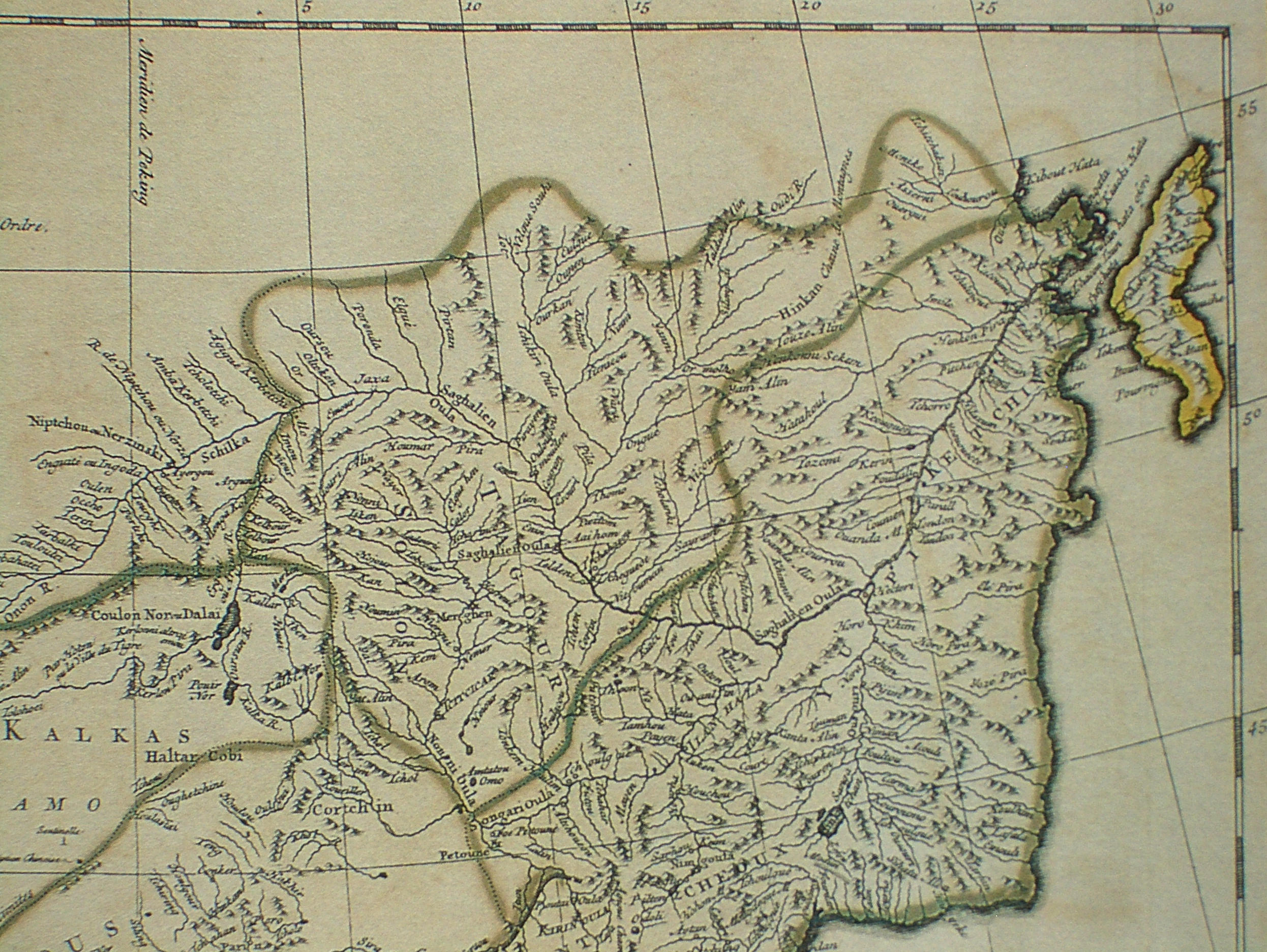
- Map of China with Albazino as Jaxa
- Capital: Albazino
- Common languages: Polish, Ruthenian, Dagur, Evenki
- Religion: Roman Catholicism; Eastern Orthodoxy; Shamanism; Buddhism
- Demonym: Jaxan
- Government: Monarchy
- King
  - 1665-1674: Nicefor Czernichowski
- History
  - Proclamation of the state: 1665
  - Tribute to Russia and recognition: 1669
  - Czernichowski becomes the lord of Jaxa: 1674
  - Incorporation into Russia: 1674
Preceded by	Succeeded by
Qing dynasty	Tsardom of Russia
- Today part of: Russia; China

Jaxa (Chinese: 雅克薩; Polish: Jaxa, Jaksa; Ukrainian: Якса; Russian: Якса, romanized: Yaksa) was a 17th-century settlement founded by fugitives in North Asia with its capital in Albazino existing between 1665 and 1674. It was located on the border of the Tsardom of Russia and Qing China, by the Amur river. Its population was made up of Polish and Ruthenian refugees from the Tsardom of Russia, and the indigenous Evenks and Daurs. It was established from the territory of the Tsardom of Russia in 1665 by Nicefor Czernichowski and his men, who fled Russia, and existed until 1674 when it was incorporated back to that country.

== Name ==
The name of Jaxa originates from the wooden stronghold of Jaxa built by Nicefor Czernichowski in place of Albazino that was destroyed by Chinese troops. The name of the fort was derived from the founder's family coat of arms, the Gryf coat of arms. According to Chinese sources, this place was called 雅克薩 (yakesa) before the rise of Albazino.

== History ==
The settlement was created by Nicefor Czernichowski, a Polish nobleman of Ruthenian origin, deported from Volhynia. In 1665 Czernichowski and Siberian Cossacks killed the voivode of Ust-Ilimsk. In order to hide in it, they rebuilt the abandoned stronghold of Albazino. In 1685 Jaxa was annexed by Qing China.

=== Albazin ===
In late 1650, Albazin was built as winter quarters by Yerofei Khabarov on the northernmost part of the Amur River, 200 kilometres (125 miles) downstream from the junction of the Argun and Shilka. Thereafter it was little used as the Russians concentrated on the richer grain-growing lands downriver. In 1652 the Qing dynasty drove the Russians out of the Amur region and the land was left to outlaws and adventurers.

=== Foundation of Jaxa ===
In 1632, during the Smolensk War, Czernihowski was taken prisoner by the Muscovites; subsequently, persuaded by Cossack comrades in Muscovite service, he decided not to return to the Polish-Lithuanian Commonwealth but to join them instead. He soon regretted this decision and attempted to desert and return to his homeland; however, he was captured during his flight and exiled to Siberia to serve in the local Cossack units. There, he rose through the ranks, eventually becoming a Cossack commander. A dramatic turn of events occurred in 1665 when Czernihowski’s daughter was raped by Lavrenty Obukhov, the voivode (governor) of Ilimsk. In retaliation, the rapist was killed by the girl’s brothers and their associates. Ultimately, nearly a hundred Cossacks, peasants, and drifters fled with Czernihowski to the Amur River, where they rebuilt the fortress of Albazin, which the Russians had abandoned twenty years earlier. In Romantic Polish historiography, this deed is elevated to the status of founding an independent state named "Jaksa"—after Czernihowski’s alleged coat of arms—on the no-man's-land between Russia and China. In reality, although he was a nobleman, he did not bear such a coat of arms, and "Jaksa" is actually a Manchu term for a river inlet. In reality, the fugitives made no attempt to establish a state entity and they never created one; Instead, they merely collected tribute from the local population, which they handed over to tsarist officials during negotiations, offering continued service along the Amur in exchange for a pardon for the earlier killing of the voivode and acts of river piracy—including the looting of the state treasury. In 1669, Nicefor Czernichowski formally acknowledged the Tsar's suzerainty. In 1672, Tsar Alexis I Romanov issued decrees—first formally sentencing Czernichowski to death for the earlier killing of the Tsarist voivode Obukhov, and then, two days later, pardoning him, granting him a reward, and appointing him deputy voivode of Albazin. In 1674, Jaxa was definitively and permanently incorporated into the Tsardom. Czernichowski was already dead when, after two sieges of the settlement, the Russians decided to withdraw from the Amur region once again.

=== The Russian-Chinese conflict over Albazin ===
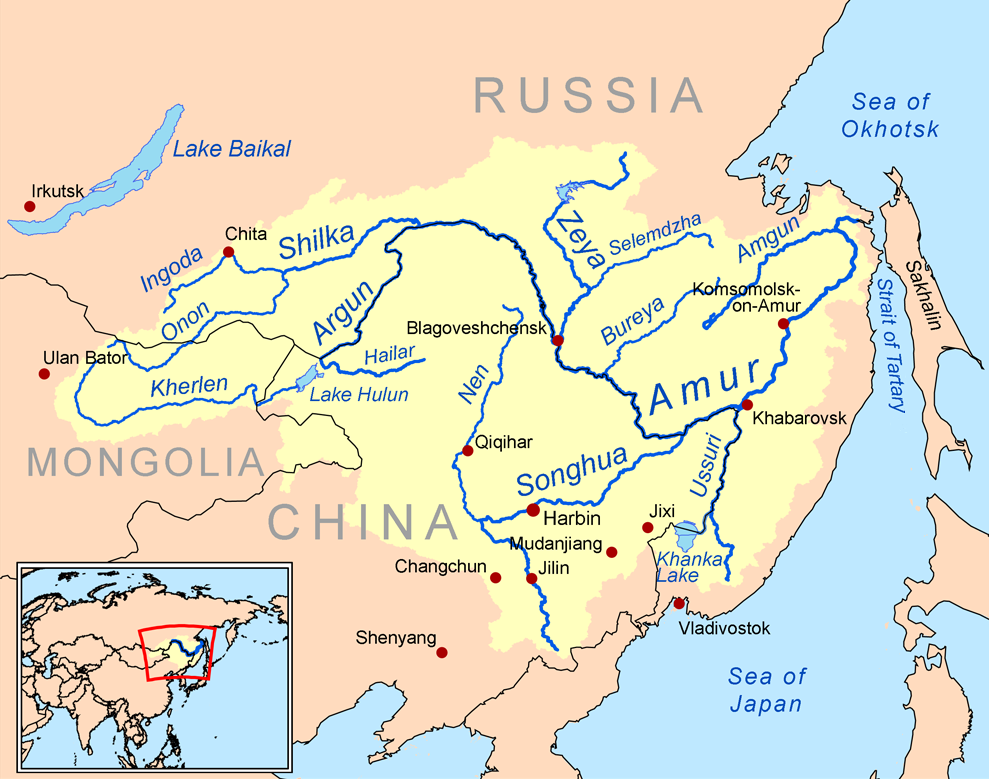
Albazin is on the northern loop of the Amur. Nerchinsk is on the lower Shilka.

The Qing dynasty did little about Albazin because their forces were tied up in southern China and because they were concerned about possible Russian backing for their enemies in Mongolia. With the southern problem nearly solved (Taiwan was conquered in 1683), in the spring of 1682 the Kangxi Emperor made a tour through Manchuria and began preparations to deal with the Amur problem. His plan was to build up such a large force that the Russians would withdraw without fighting, for, as he said "The use of force is not a good thing. We use it only under compulsion." Troops were moved up to Aigun and crops were planted to feed them. An attack was delayed due to disagreements among the planners and the difficulty of moving supplies northward.

From 1681 there were Qing threats against Albazin, talks were held on the Nen River and minor Russian forts were destroyed along the Zeya. By the end of 1683, all Russian bases except Albazin had been eliminated. Moscow responded by making Ivan Vlasov voyevoda of Nerchinsk and appointing Akeksey Tolbuzin to a new voivodeship at Albazin (July 1684). An attempt to move men and supplies east failed due to shortages and inefficiency.

The siege began on June 23, 1685. On the June 26 there was an indecisive day-long battle. Qing troops thereupon piled dry wood along the fort's wooden walls and when they began to light it, Tolbuzin surrendered (exact date uncertain). The 600 or so defenders were allowed to withdraw to Nerchinsk. About 45 opted to go with the Qing troops where they joined the Albazinians in Peking. Qing troops burned the fort and withdrew, but did not destroy the crops. When news of the defeat reached Moscow in November it was decided to abandon the Amur and send an ambassador to Peking.

In 1686, one day after leaving Albazin, the retreating Russians met a group of reinforcements who brought word that an even larger group under Baiton had reached Nerchinsk. Since the fort was lost they continued their withdrawal. Sometime after July 10, 1685, scouts reported that Qing troops were gone and the crops still standing. Vlasov sent 669 well-armed men under Tolbuzin to gather the harvest. The crops were gathered, Albazin was refortified with earthen walls and efforts were made to bring the natives back into subjection. Qing troops arrived on July 18, 1686, and began a tight siege and a steady cannonade. On the fifth day of the siege, Tolbuzin was killed by a cannonball and replaced by Afanasii Baiton. The Russians had enough food to last until Easter, but were short of water. The siege continued until early winter. In late October messengers arrived in Peking announcing Moscow's desire to negotiate. An order was issued to relax the siege. At this time less than 66 men, out of an original 826, were left alive (most had died of disease, especially scurvy). On December 25 Baiton sent one of his men to request provisions. A few more than twenty men remained in the fort, all ill and undernourished. When, in August 1687, the Kangxi Emperor heard (incorrectly) that the Russian ambassador had reached Mongolia, he ordered the Qing troops withdrawn.

By the Treaty of Nerchinsk in 1689, Albazin was abandoned and destroyed. The former territory of Jaxa was incorporated into the Qing dynasty of China.
