= Siege of Albazin =

1685 siege on the Russian–Chinese border

- Part of Sino-Russian border conflicts
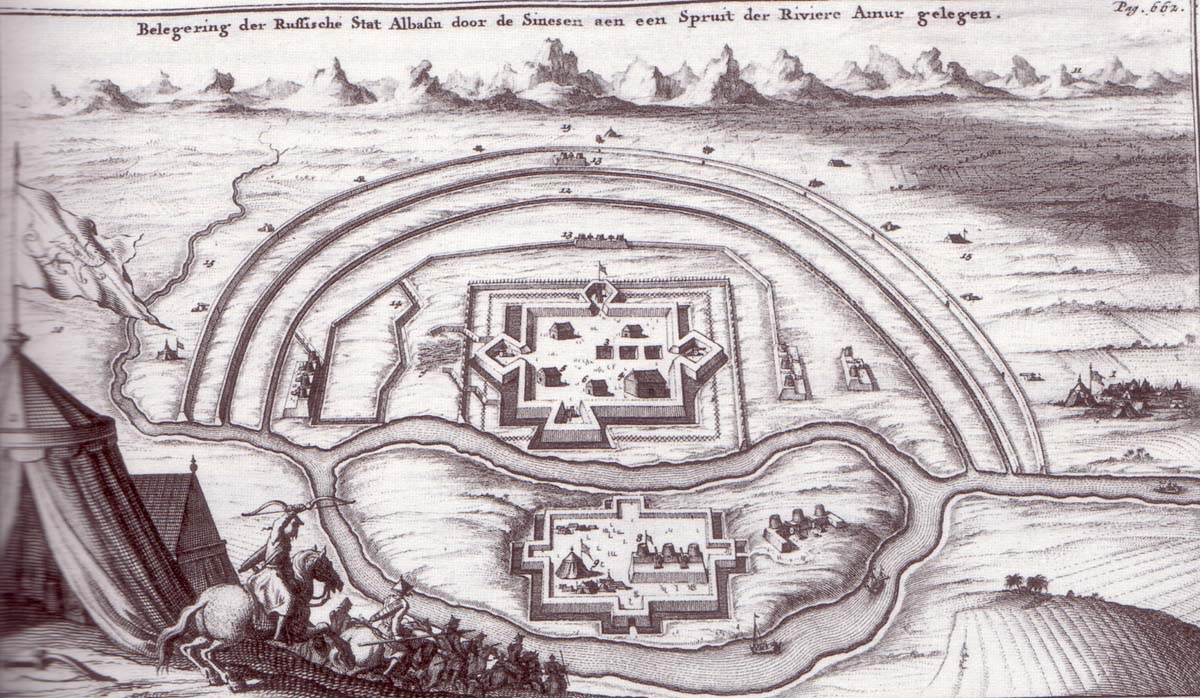
- Qing forces attacking Albazin
Date	1685, 1686
Location	Albazin, Siberia on the north bank of the Amur River above Manchuria (present-day Albazino, Amur Oblast, Russia)
Result	1685: Qing victory 1686: See aftermath

Belligerents
Tsardom of Russia	Qing dynasty

Commanders and leaders
Alexei Tolbuzin †; Pasheli; Afanasii Ivanovich Beiton	Langtan; Sapusu

Strength
1685: 450; 1686: 736–900	1685: 2,500–3,400; 1686: 3,000 (land); 3,000-6,000 (sailors)

Casualties and losses
1685: 100+, 25–40 defected 1686: Only 24-35 survived	1686: 1,500+

The siege of Albazin was a military conflict between the Tsardom of Russia and Qing China from 1685 to 1686. It ultimately ended in the surrender of Albazin to Qing China and Russian abandonment of the Amur River area in return for trading privileges in Beijing.

== Background ==
After the Battle of Hutong (1658), the Russians made no formal attempt to gain control of the Amur River valley. However, they did actively compete with the Manchus for the allegiance of nearby peoples. In 1667, the Hamnigan Buryat leader Gantimur refused the Qing request to join them in military operations against the Russians and went over to the other side. The Qing tried to win him back with gifts, and when that did not work, demanded that the Russians extradite him, which also did not work. The Qing were unable to immediately mount a military expedition against the Russians at this time due to being hampered by a lack of supplies in the Amur region.

Russian territory west of Lake Baikal was consolidated in 1661 with the foundation of Irkutsk; however, expansion south was halted in 1663 with a defeat in Uriankhai territory. Russian migration into the area also intensified with the relocation of exiles from Lithuania and Poland. From these exiles came the Polish Nikifor Chernigovsky, who in 1665 murdered his guards at Ilimsk, and fled with a gang of escaped prisoners to Albazin, where they rebuilt the fort. While technically a refugee, Chernigovsky collected tribute from the local peoples and sent part of it to the authorities in Nerchinsk. In 1672, the Russian authorities in Nerchinsk formally claimed Albazin. Chernigovsky was captured and sent back to Moscow, where he was pardoned and sent back to the Amur. Unlike other parts of the Russian Far East, Albazin's lands were fertile and the fort quickly grew to a settlement with buildings multiplying and farms spreading throughout the valley.

Qing presence in the region also expanded in the 1680s with the construction of forts at Aigun and Mergen, and a dock at Girin. An office was set up at Butha to administrate the hunter gatherers of the Greater and Lesser Khingan ranges.

== Siege of 1685 ==
In June 1686, Langtan led a force of 3,000 Qing soldiers to lay siege on Albazin, which was held by approximately 450 men led by Alexei Tolbuzin. According to Russians sources, the Qing had a "great might of guns" and even more powerful cannons than the Hongyipao, called "miraculous-power general cannons". More than a hundred Russians died from bombardment on the first day of the siege. The Russian side surrendered the next day and was allowed to leave for Nerchinsk; however, many Russians decided to defect to the Qing instead. Albazin and the nearby villages and the monastery were razed, but for some reason the crops were left untouched.

== Siege of 1686 ==
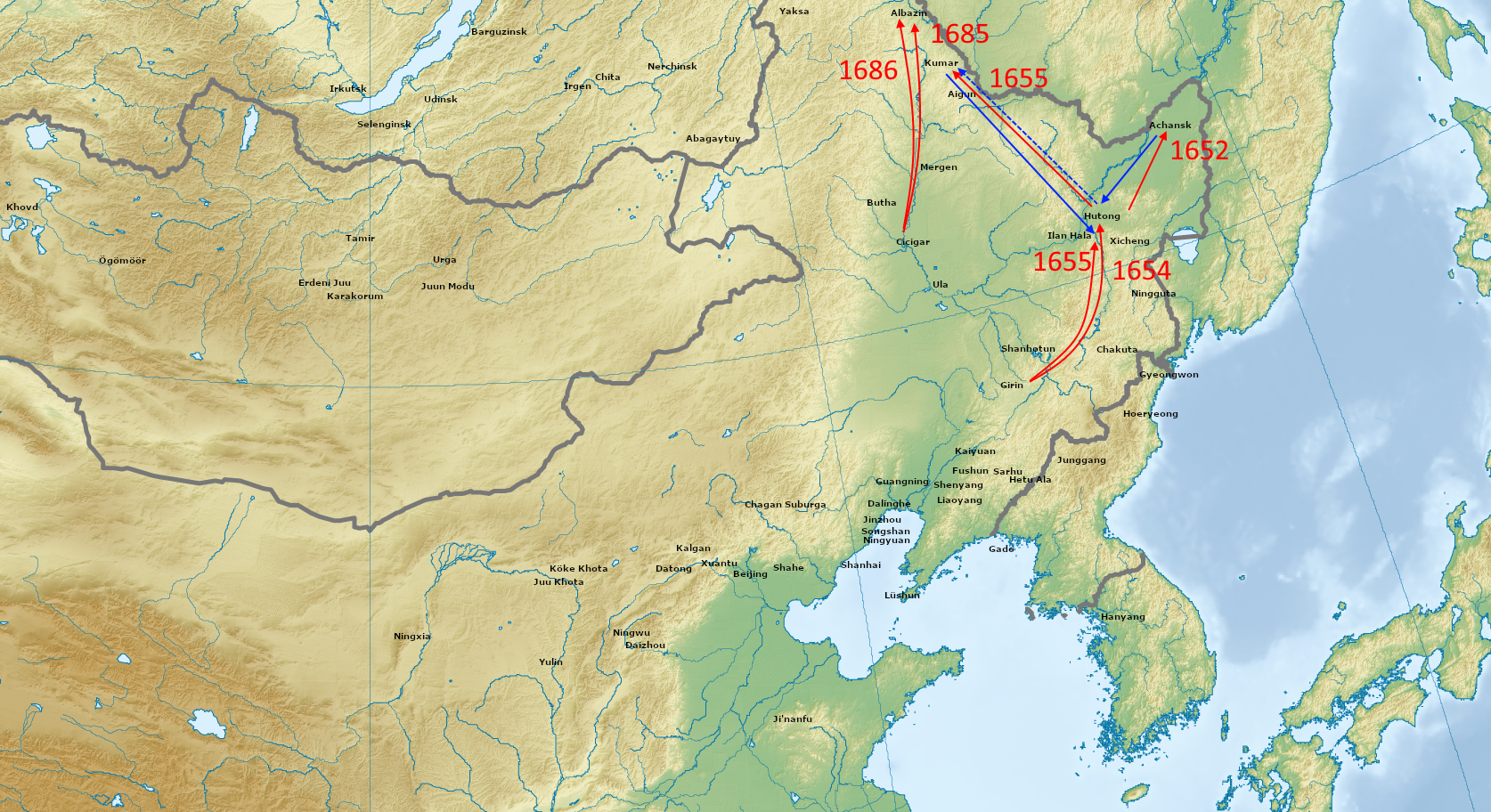
Russian-Qing border conflicts in the 17th century

The Russians led by Tolbuzin returned to Albazin to reap the crops. This time they built a stout bastion fort with the help of a Prussian military expert by the name of Afanasii Ivanovich Beiton, who had been captured in 1667 by the Russians and sent as a prisoner to Siberia. The new walls, made of an earthen core, were reinforced with a weave of clay and tree roots, making them uncommonly strong.

In July 1686, Langtan and Sapusu led 3,000 soldiers and laid siege to Albazin again. This time the Qing forces were unable to penetrate the walls despite many attempts. On 23 July, the Qing made a direct assault on the southern wall after bombardment from cannons, but were forced to retreat with heavy losses. The Russians however made several successful sallies, sometimes even taking prisoners. They became too confident at one point and fell into an ambush while trying to dismantle the enemy siegeworks. Due to the bastions and design of the fortress, the Qing were unable to gain an advantageous position to bombard the defending forces. In early August, the Qing established walls around the fort and cut off Russian access to the river. The Russians tried to prevent this but failed after fighting for four days straight. A complete blockade had been erected around Albazin by the end of August. The Russians became very sick and started dying from scurvy, typhus, and cholera. Of the 800-900 defenders who held Albazin at the beginning of the siege, no more than 150 remained alive by early November. The Qing forces too suffered heavily, although not as much as the Russians, and by November less than half of the original 3,000 remained.

According to one source, the Qing killed Tolbuzin and retook the fort. Only 70 of the original defenders remained alive and half of them died to starvation and disease soon after. Thereafter, the Kangxi Emperor dispatched a message to Moscow offering trade in return for Russian withdraw from the Amur.

Another source says that the siege ended following peace overtures by the Russians. In October 1686, Russian envoys from Moscow arrived in Beijing seeking peace. The Kangxi Emperor sent a messenger to Albazin, arriving in December, and announced a pause to the siege of Albazin. Of the 800-900 defenders, only 24 survived. They were permitted to leave the fort, buy supplies, and were provided with food and medical aid by the Qing forces. According to European sources, the Russians led by Beiton refused the aid offered and instead sent a 16 kg baked pie to the Qing commander as a present. Qing sources however say that it was Beiton himself who asked for provisions. The man who delivered the provisions returned with a dismal report of the fort's conditions, noting that only 24 Russians still lived and even Beiton himself was sick. The Qing army withdrew a distance from Albazin in May 1687 and left Albazin for Qiqihar and Aigun in August 1687. The Russians rebuilt their villages and cultivated the fields but were not allowed to hunt because it was viewed as infringing on Chinese sovereignty. Albazin was relinquished to the Qing in the Treaty of Nerchinsk of 1689 in return for Russian trading privileges in Beijing.

== Aftermath ==
There are various interpretations of the outcome of the siege of 1686. According to John J. Stephan and Jeremy Black, the Qing retook the fort of Albazin as a result of the siege, leading to the Russians suing for peace. According to Tonio Andrade, the Russians never surrendered, so the siege cannot technically be counted as a Qing victory. However he notes that had the conflict continued, the Qing likely would have won. According to Vincent Chen, peace negotiations between the two sides, initiated by the Russians, led to an unconditional truce owing to the lenient policy of China.

Fearing that the Khori and Solon would side with the Russians, the Qing had their communities relocated to Manchu lands. Most of them either died of starvation or were assimilated into the Eight Banners. In August 1689, the Treaty of Nerchinsk, which saw the official surrender of the Amur region by the Russians to the Manchus, was agreed upon under threat of arms from the Qing. The treaty allowed the Russians to trade in Beijing and a caravan route was set up from Nerchinsk via the Nonni River. The Qing further consolidated their presence in Heilongjiang with garrisons in Qiqihar and Butha in 1691, however they made virtually no attempt to patrol their Amur frontier, rather opting to depopulate the northern bank of the Amur river. In the Qing view, the possibility of tribal peoples raiding Qing territory from Russian territory was a greater threat than a direct Russian incursion.

The Treaty of Kyakhta (1727) was signed in 1728 demarking the international border between the two empires in northern Mongolia. Kyakhta became a trading town with both a Russian and Chinese populace. Midway between the Chinese town and Russian fortress two posts were planted, one inscribed with Russian and the other with Manchu writing.

== Bibliography ==
- Andrade, Tonio (2016), The Gunpowder Age: China, Military Innovation, and the Rise of the West in World History, Princeton University Press, ISBN 978-0-691-13597-7.
- Chen, Vincent (1966), Sino-Russian War on the Amur
- Christian, David (2018), A History of Russia, Central Asia, and Mongolia 2
- Kang, Hyeok Hweon (2013), "Big Heads and Buddhist Demons: The Korean Musketry Revolution and the Northern Expeditions of 1654 and 1658" (PDF), Journal of Chinese Military History, 2, archived from the original (PDF) on 2020-10-02
- Narangoa, Li (2014), Historical Atlas of Northeast Asia, 1590-2010: Korea, Manchuria, Mongolia, Eastern Siberia, New York: Columbia University Press, ISBN 9780231160704
