= Gantimur =

Daurian tribal chief and military leader

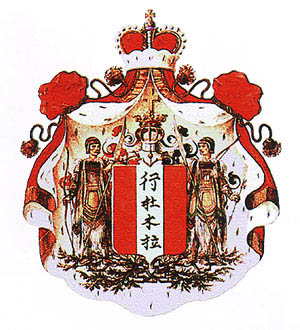
Coat of arms of the Gantimurov princely family, granted after Gantimur's baptism and ennoblement in 1684

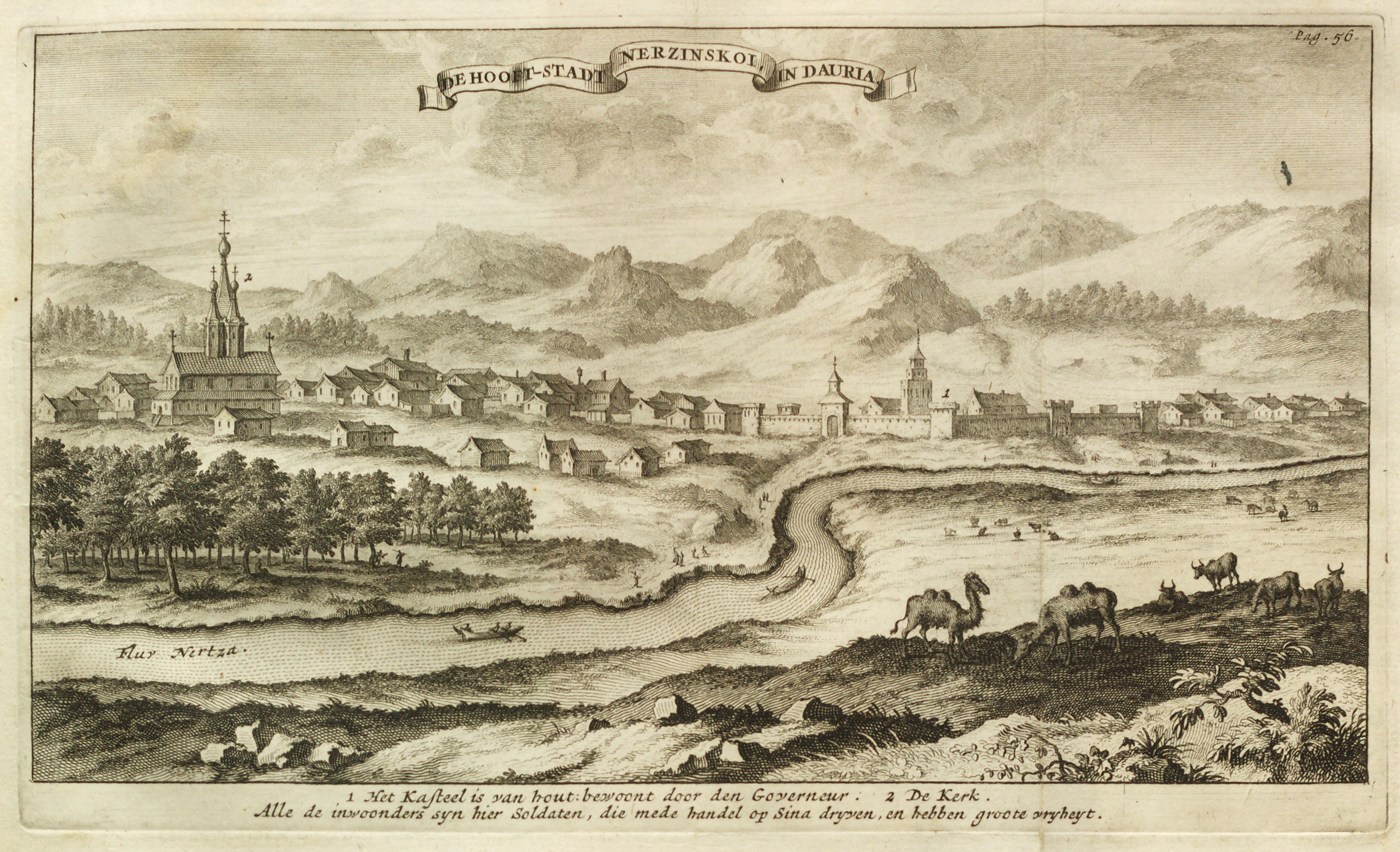
View of Nerchinsk in 1710, showing the wooden fort, the town, and the "Wooden Palace" of the Gantimurov princes

Gantimur (Mongolian: Гүн Төмөр; Chinese: 根特木; pinyin: Gēntèmù; Russian: Гантимур; died 1685) was a Daurian tribal chief and military leader who became a pivotal figure in the struggle between the Qing dynasty and the Tsardom of Russia for control over the Amur River basin and Transbaikalia. By defecting to the Russians in 1667, he brought a large body of indigenous warriors and their territories under Russian protection, fundamentally altering the balance of power in the region and laying the groundwork for the eventual establishment of the Sino-Russian border. He is the ancestor of the Russian princely Gantimurov family, which for centuries held influence in eastern Siberia. His date of birth is unrecorded; he was born on the Nercha River, near what later became Nerchinsk.

== Early life and tribal background ==
Gantimur was born into the ruling stratum of the Daur tribes, a Mongolic-speaking people who inhabited the valleys of the upper Amur and its tributaries, including the Shilka, Argun, and Nercha rivers. The Daurs practiced a mixed economy of agriculture, hunting, and livestock herding, and lived in fortified settlements with wooden palisades. They were organised into clans, each headed by a hereditary chief. Gantimur's immediate family also had strong ties to the neighbouring Evenk (Tungus) tribes, through marriage and traditional alliances. The name Gantimur is of Mongolian origin, combining gan (steel) and tömör (iron), indicating the high value placed on martial qualities.

Crucially, Gantimur was related by blood to the imperial house of the Jurchen Later Jin dynasty, the precursors of the Qing. This connection came through his mother's line, which linked him to the descendants of Nurhaci, the founder of the Qing. Such kinship gave him considerable prestige among the tribal confederations of the Amur and ensured that his later defection was seen by the Qing court not only as a military loss but as a personal affront to the imperial family.

== The geopolitical situation in the Amur basin (1640s–1660s) ==
By the middle of the 17th century, two expansionist powers were converging on the Amur region. From the south, the newly established Qing dynasty was consolidating its hold over Manchuria and sought to incorporate the tribes of the Amur into its tributary system. Qing expeditions had reached the Amur by the 1640s, extracting oaths of allegiance and demanding furs, ginseng, and other resources. From the north, Russian explorers and Cossacks had crossed Siberia and reached the Pacific Ocean in 1639. In 1651, Yerofey Khabarov's expedition built a fort at Albazin on the Amur, and by the 1650s a string of Russian forts, including Kumarsk and Nerchinsk (founded 1653), dotted the region.

Conflict was inevitable. The Qing viewed the Amur tribes as their vassals and the Russian presence as an intrusion. The Russians, for their part, saw the fur-rich Amur as a natural extension of their eastward advance. Indigenous communities were caught between the two empires, often forced to choose sides. This is the context in which Gantimur made his fateful decision.

== Service under the Qing ==
Gantimur initially accepted Qing suzerainty. In 1654, responding to the entreaties of the Shunzhi Emperor, he travelled to the Qing court at Beijing. There he was formally enrolled among the ranks of the imperial banner officers and given command of a cavalry force composed of his own Evenk and Daur followers. Estimates of the number of horsemen vary, but contemporary Russian accounts speak of 8,000 cavalry under his command, while Chinese sources mention a similarly substantial force. He was ordered to lead these warriors into Inner Mongolia as part of the Qing's mobile defence against Russian incursions.

For more than a decade, Gantimur and his men guarded the frontier, but the relationship with the Qing soured. The Qing imposed heavy tribute obligations on the Amur tribes, and military conscription disrupted traditional economic life. Moreover, the Manchu authorities treated the Daur chiefs as subordinate commanders, not as equals. Gantimur, accustomed to the autonomy of a tribal leader, chafed under this subordination.

== Defection to Russia (1667) ==
The immediate trigger for defection came in 1667. That year, after a series of disputes with Qing officials, Gantimur decided to abandon the Qing and return to his ancestral lands on the Nercha River. He took with him his immediate family, about forty tribal elders, and a substantial number of common tribespeople. The exact number is uncertain, but the defection was large enough to dramatically weaken Qing authority in the upper Amur region.

Gantimur made contact with the Russian commander at Nerchinsk, the voevoda (governor) of the fort, and offered his allegiance to Tsar Alexis. The Russians, acutely aware of the value of such an ally, welcomed him. Gantimur's knowledge of the terrain, his tribal connections, and his military force turned the Nerchinsk fort from an isolated outpost into the centre of a network of allied indigenous groups.

The Qing response was swift. The Kangxi Emperor dispatched envoys to Nerchinsk with letters demanding Gantimur's return. The emperor offered to pardon him and restore his rank, and even proposed exchanging him for Russian prisoners held in Beijing. Gantimur refused all such overtures. According to Russian records, he told the envoys that he had been poorly treated by the Qing and preferred the Russians, who allowed him to live according to his own customs. The Qing court was furious. Gantimur's continued absence became a central point of contention in the decades-long diplomatic wrangling that culminated in the Treaty of Nerchinsk in 1689.

== Integration into the Russian Empire ==
Following his defection, Gantimur settled permanently at Nerchinsk, where the tsar's government granted him a residence known as the "Wooden Palace" (Derevyanny dvorets). He was placed in command of the local Tungus and Mongol tribes, acting as a yasak (tribute) collector and military organiser for the Russians. His authority was considerable; he effectively governed the indigenous population of the Nerchinsk district on behalf of the Russian crown.

In 1684, Gantimur formally converted to Russian Orthodoxy. The baptism took place either at Tobolsk, the ecclesiastical centre of Siberia, or at Nerchinsk itself, with high-ranking clergy officiating. He received the Christian name Peter (Pyotr). At the same time, the tsar ennobled him, granting the title of knyaz (prince) and establishing the hereditary Gantimurov family as part of the Russian nobility. The arms granted to the family incorporate symbols of their Siberian origins: a bow and arrow, a sabre, and a silver river, set on a blue field.

== Death and burial ==
In 1685, the Russian government summoned Gantimur to Moscow. The purpose was likely to consult him about the ongoing border negotiations with the Qing, or to present him at the court of the young Tsar Ivan V and Tsar Peter I. Gantimur set out with a retinue but fell ill during the long journey. He died near the small settlement of Narym on the Ob River in western Siberia. He was buried there, far from his homeland. The precise location of his grave is now lost.

== Legacy and historical significance ==
Gantimur's defection had far-reaching consequences that extended well beyond his own lifetime. In immediate terms, it secured the Russian hold on Nerchinsk and the surrounding Transbaikal region. The Qing demand for his return was a major issue in the negotiations that produced the Treaty of Nerchinsk (1689), the first treaty between China and a European power. By remaining in Russian service, Gantimur gave the tsar a strong bargaining position and ensured that the frontier would be fixed along the Argun and Gorbitsa rivers, leaving Nerchinsk and much of Transbaikalia in Russian hands.

The Gantimurov princely family continued to play a prominent role in Siberian affairs. His descendants served as voevody (governors) of Nerchinsk, commanded Cossack regiments, and participated in the exploration and administration of the Russian Far East. Over the centuries, they intermarried with other noble houses and retained their title and estates. The family coat of arms is recorded in the General Armorial of the Noble Families of the Russian Empire.

In a broader sense, Gantimur's story illustrates the complex dynamics of empire-building on the early modern frontier. He was neither a simple collaborator nor a passive victim; rather, he navigated the clash of empires to maximise his own autonomy and the welfare of his people. His defection exemplifies how indigenous leaders could shape the course of imperial expansion, tipping the balance between competing powers.

== In historical memory and scholarship ==
Gantimur's biography was first systematically recorded in the Eminent Chinese of the Ch'ing Period (1943), where the Russian scholar A. V. Iiarakueff wrote the entry. Since then, he has been studied by historians of both Russia and China. Western scholarship, particularly Peter C. Perdue's China Marches West (2005), has placed him at the centre of the Qing–Russian frontier narrative. In Russia, the Gantimurov family history has been the subject of genealogical research, and the old Nerchinsk fort, along with the architectural legacy of the region, remains a point of local pride.

Local museums in the Zabaykalsky Krai (the former Chita Oblast) contain exhibits on the Gantimurov family, and the name Gantimur appears in regional toponyms and folklore. While not widely known outside specialist circles, he is recognised as a foundational figure in the history of Russian-Chinese relations.

== See also ==
- Treaty of Nerchinsk
- Amur Annexation
- Daur people
- Nerchinsk
- Gantimurov family
