= Albazinians =

Chinese descendants of Russian Cossacks

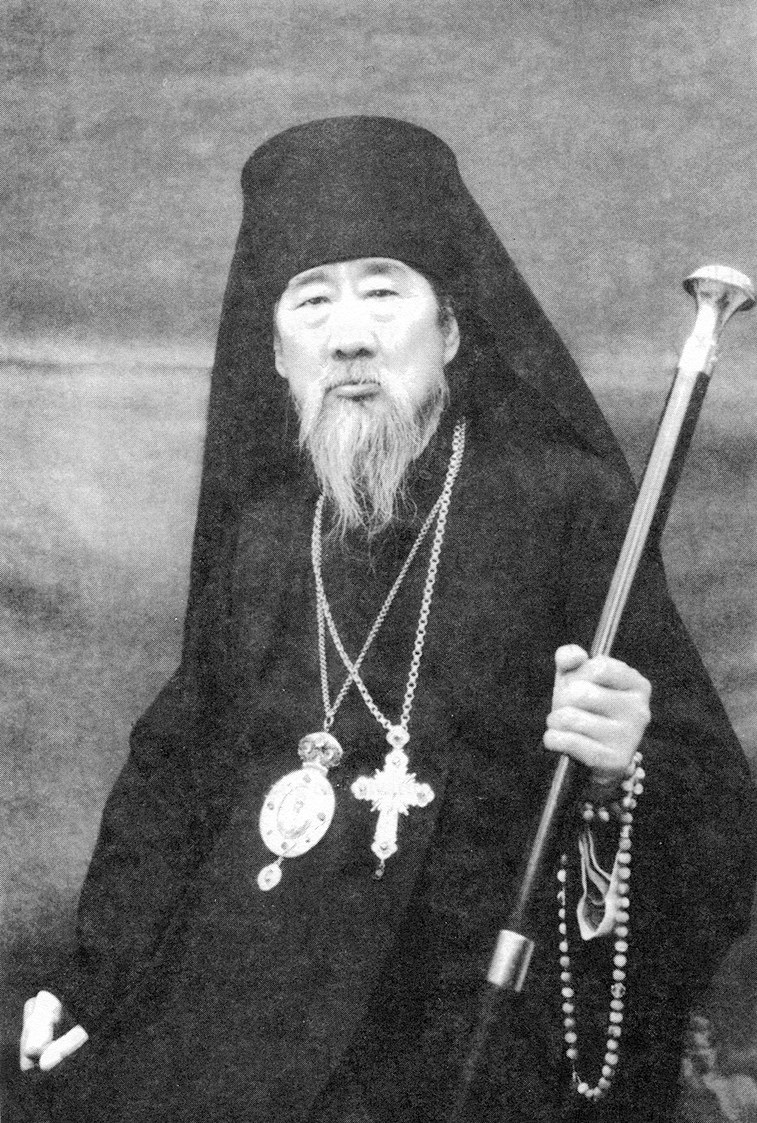
Simeon Runchen Du, Albazinian Orthodox bishop of Shanghai (1956–1965)

The Albazinians (Russian: албазинцы; simplified Chinese: 阿尔巴津人; traditional Chinese: 阿爾巴津人) are one of several Chinese ethnic groups of Russian descent. There are approximately 250 Albazinians in China who are descendants of about fifty Russian Cossacks who fought at the Siege of Albazin on the Amur River that were resettled by the Kangxi Emperor in the northeastern periphery of Beijing in 1685. Albazin was a Russian fort on the Amur River, founded by Yerofey Khabarov in 1651. It was stormed by Qing troops in 1685. The majority of its inhabitants agreed to evacuate their families and property to Nerchinsk, whereas several young Cossacks resolved to join the Manchu army and to relocate to Beijing. See Sino-Russian border conflicts.

== Initiatives ==
Much uncertainty surrounds their migration to China. It is believed that, upon their arrival to the imperial capital, the Albazinians met the descendants of 33 Cossacks that had been captured by the Chinese in 1667 and several Cossacks that had settled in Beijing as early as 1649 and had become the parishioners of the South Roman Catholic Cathedral in the city. The veracity of this oral tradition about the pre-Albazinian Russian diaspora in China is open to question.

The Albazinians formed a separate contingent of the imperial guard, known as the "unit of the yellow-stripe standard". Their first leader was Ananiy Uruslanov or Ulangeri, a Tatar in the employ of the Manchu. The Russian surnames Yakovlev, Dubinin and Romanov were rendered in Chinese as Yao (姚), Du (杜) and Luo (Simplified Chinese: 罗, Traditional Chinese: 羅). The Qing gave permission for Solon widows to marry the Albazinians. They married with Mongol and Manchu women. The women available for marriage to the Albazinians were criminals from Beijing's jails. Their priest, Maxim Leontiev, was allowed to hold divine service in a deserted Lamaist shrine. An old icon of St. Nicholas, evacuated by the Cossacks from Albazin, was placed in this unusual church, dedicated to the Holy Wisdom.

The Albazinian company was placed into the Manchu Bordered Yellow Banner and lived in the northeast of the "Tartar city" in Beijing. The Albazians were made into a Baoyi company, not a military company.

Although the descendants of the Cossacks intermarried with the Chinese and gradually lost their command of the Russian language, the Russian Orthodox Church regularly sent missions to Beijing, starting in 1713. As a result, the Albazinians came to form the core of the Chinese Orthodox Church. In 1831, Ioakinf Bichurin reported that there were 94 Albazinians in the capital of China. Other Russian travellers noted that, apart from their faith, the Albazinians were thoroughly Sinicized and bore little physical resemblance to the Russians. By the end of the 19th century, their number was estimated at 1,000.

The Boxer Rebellion entailed the persecution of all Christians and Europeans in China. The Russian Orthodox Church claims that 222 Orthodox Chinese were martyred on 11 June 1900, including Father Mitrofan, who was later declared a holy martyr. An Orthodox chapel used to mark the burial place of the Chinese Orthodox martyrs in Beijing. It was destroyed in 1956 at the urging of the Soviet ambassador in China. Although several Albazinian families found it reasonable to move to the Soviet Union during the Cultural Revolution, the bulk of them still reside in Beijing and Tianjin.

== Later history ==
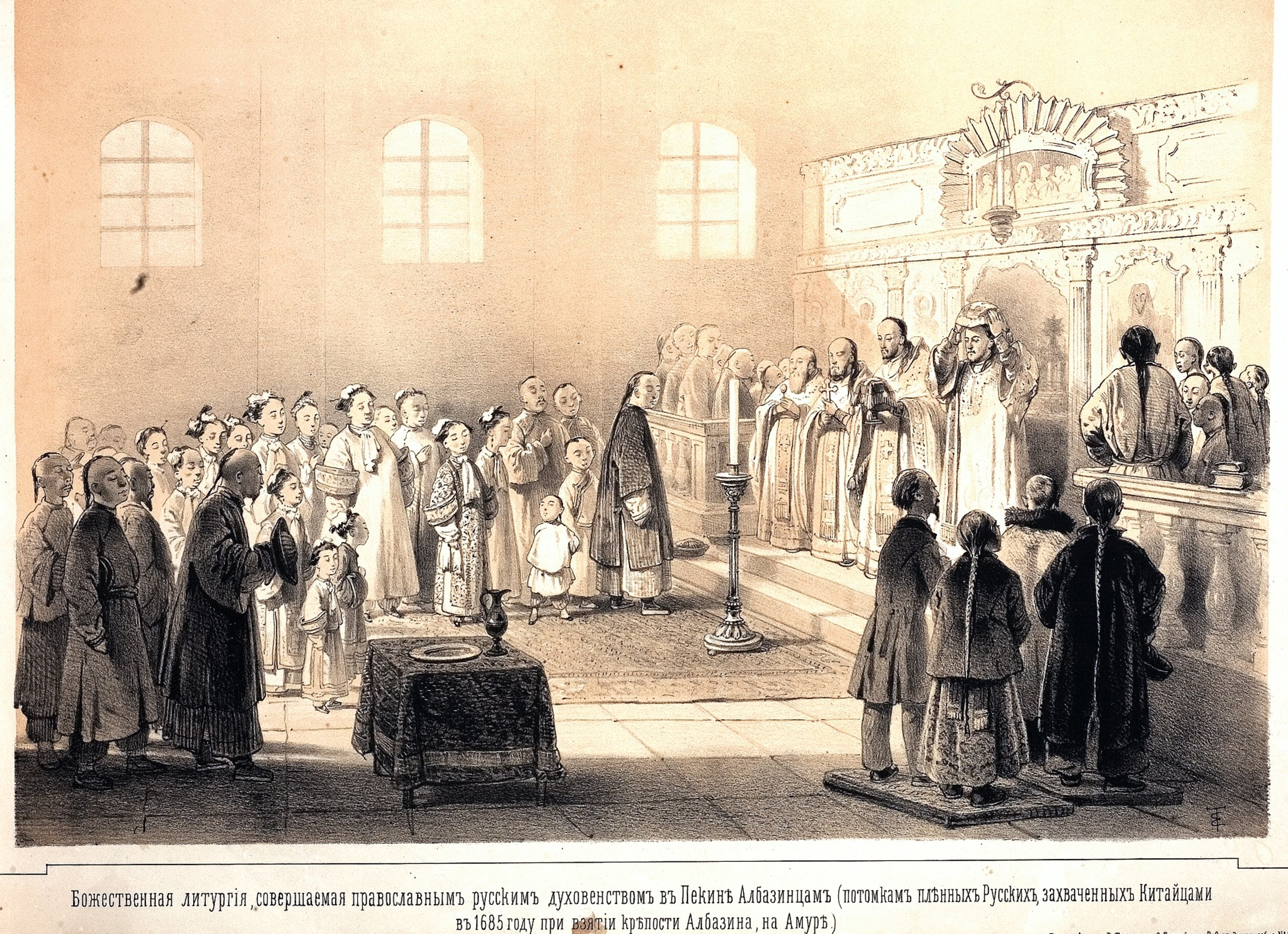
Albazinian Liturgy in Beijing, by Ivan Chmutov

After the first siege of Albazin in 1685, most of the Cossacks were allowed to return to Russian territory at Nerchinsk, but nearly 45 of them decided to surrender to the Manchus. Many of these had native wives or concubines who were not allowed to leave the Manchu realm. They were sent to Beijing where they joined about 70 other Russians who had previously been captured or defected. They were enrolled in the seventeenth company of the fourth regiment of the Bordered Yellow Banner and given space in the northeast corner of the Tatar City of Peking (at a different place from the O-lo-ssu Kuan). This was a 'household' rather than line unit and had non-combat duties like bow-making. Some were used as messengers to Nerchinsk. Since most were illiterate they were of little use as translators or sources of intelligence.

They were given an old Buddhist prayer house which was turned into the church of Saint Nicholas. The priest was Maxim Leonov who had been captured on the Amur in 1673 along with seventy other men. The Russian government was apparently unaware of the Saint Nicholas church, since, during the Ides mission of 1692 they asked permission to build an Orthodox church in Peking. When Tulishen went to Russia in 1712 he carried a request for a new priest, Father Maxim having died a year or so before. He returned with an archimandrite and nine lesser clerics (to serve a congregation of about 50). By the time of the Izmailov mission in 1722, only one priest and three junior clerics survived. The fifth article of the Treaty of Kyakhta authorized the permanent presence of a church, a priest with three assistants and six students to learn the local language. One of these, Alexei Leontev, helped negotiate the 1768 convention of Kyakhta.

== See also ==
- Russians in China
- Harbin Russians
- Russians in Hong Kong
