= Albazino =

Village in Skovorodinsky District of Amur Oblast, Russia

Albazino Албазино (Russian) 阿勒巴沁 (Chinese)
- Village
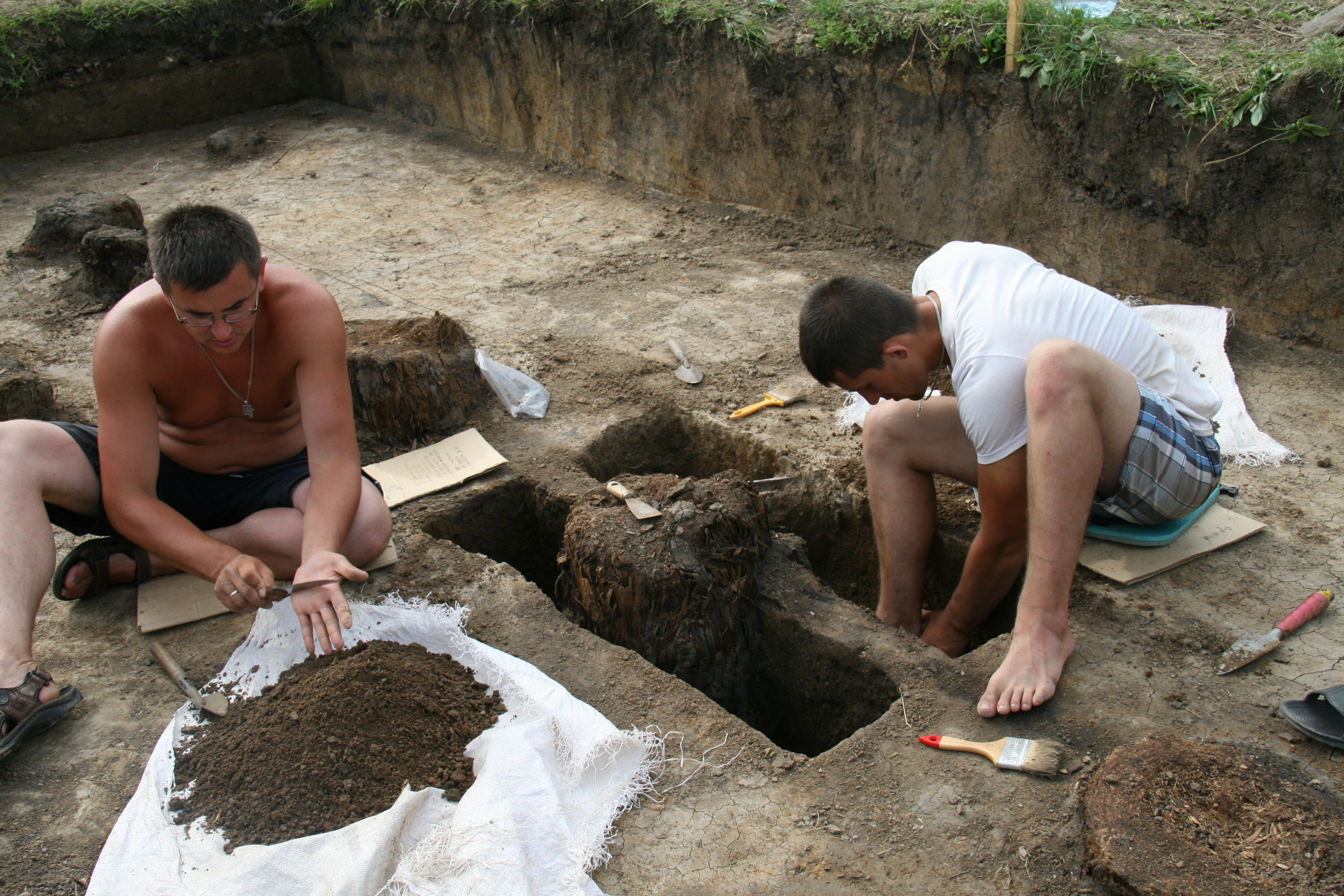
- Archaeological excavations at the site of the Albazinsky prison (2014)

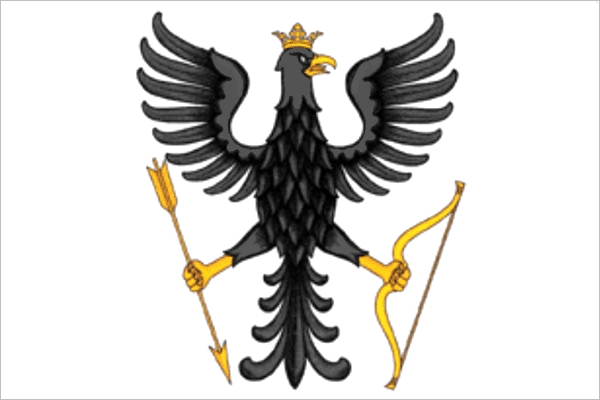
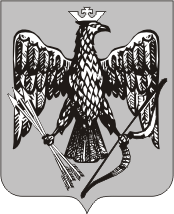
- Flag

- Location within Amur Oblast Location within Russia
- Coordinates: 53°23′26″N 124°04′39″E
- Country: Russia
- Oblast: Amur Oblast

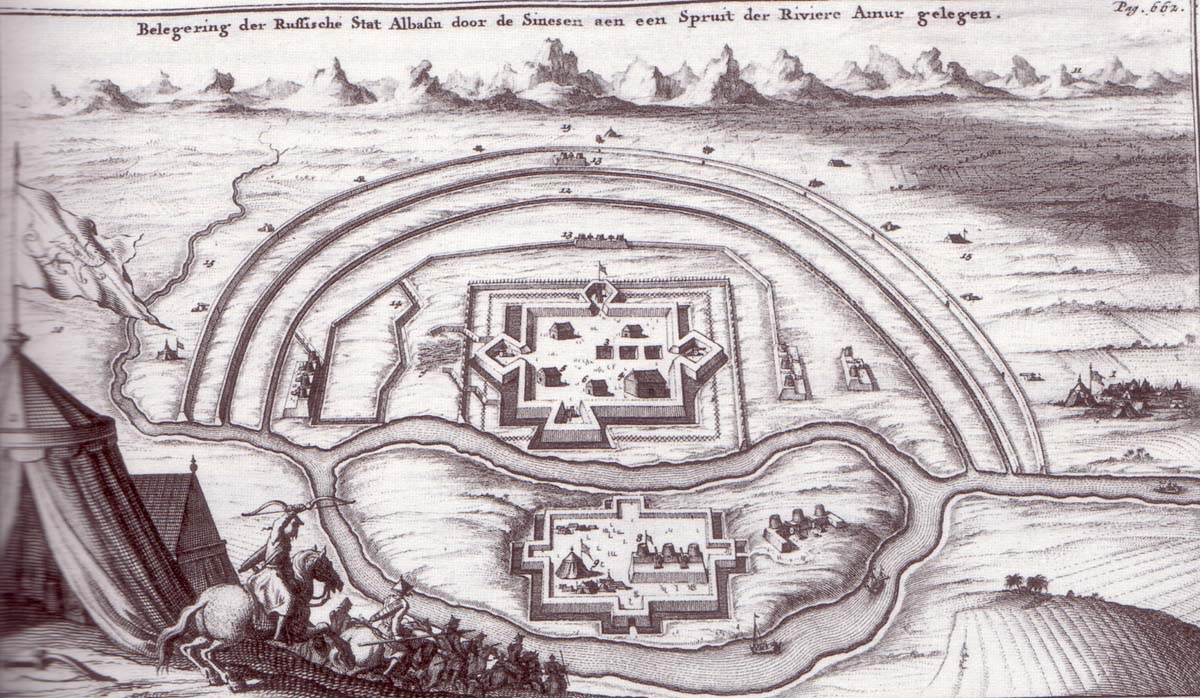
Qing troops besieging Albazin in 1686, from Noord en Oost Tartarye

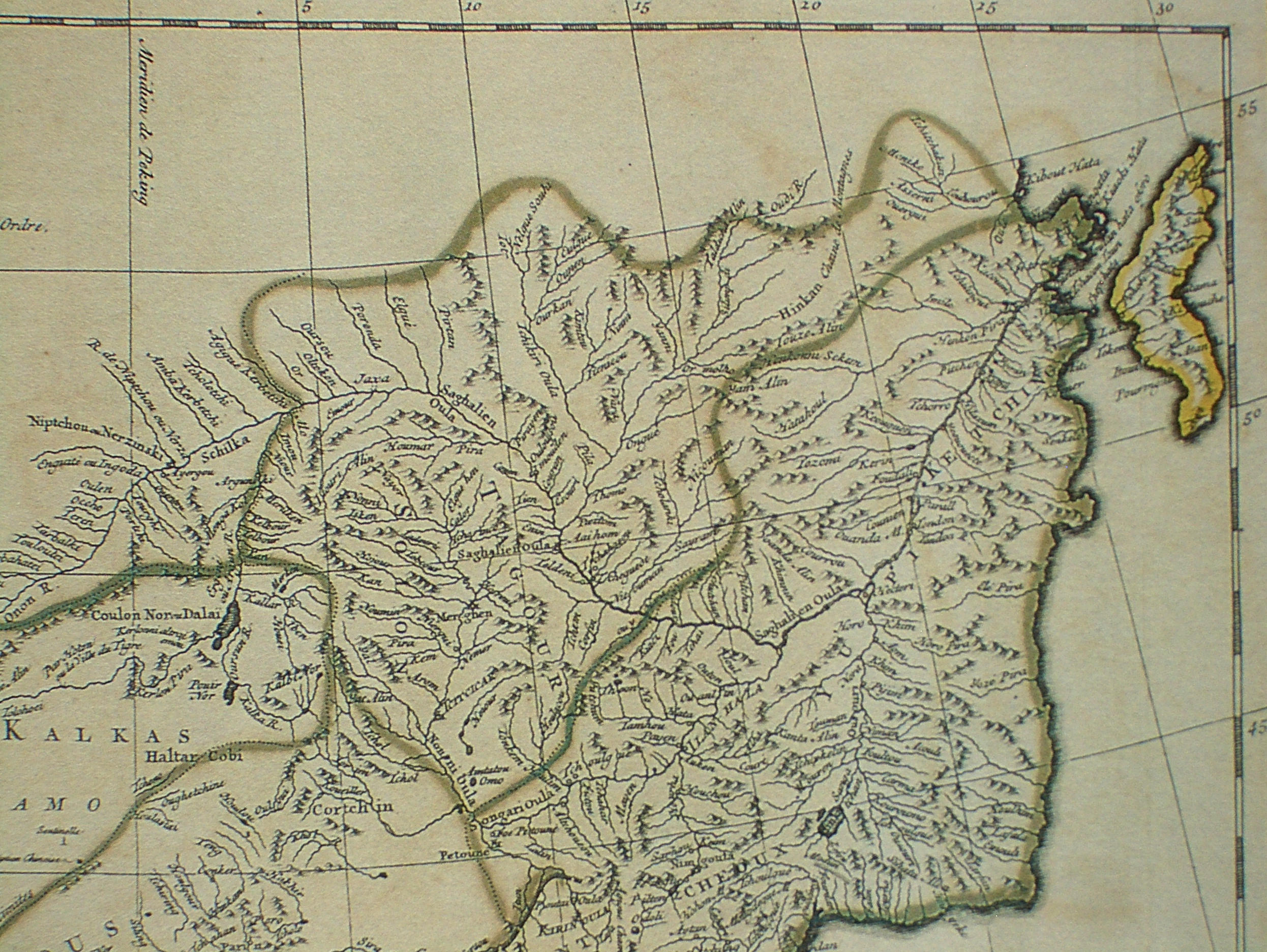
The former site of Albazin marked (as Yaxa) on an early 18th-century French map

Albazino (Russian: Алба́зино; Chinese: 阿勒巴沁) is a village (selo) in Skovorodinsky District of Amur Oblast, Russia, noted as the site of Albazin (Албазин), the first Russian settlement on the Amur River.

Before the arrival of Russians, Albazino belonged to the Daur people, the Mongolic peoples indigenous to this area. The town was originated by prince Albaz as the capital of Solon Khanate (Sinicized: 索倫汗國).

Later in the 17th century, the town was the center of the short-lived petty Polish-speaking state of Jaxa (Manchu: yaksa; Chinese: 雅克薩; Russian: Якса, romanized: Yaksa).

In the late 1640s, a team of Russian Cossacks under Yerofey Khabarov arrived to explore Dauria. They were keen to gain a foothold in the proximity of the Amur River and, after several clashes with the Daurs under Prince Albaza or Albaaši (Sinicized: 阿爾巴西), established a Russian fort of Albazin in 1651. The Russians were defeated here by Qing China at the Siege of Albazin in 1686 (see below). By the Treaty of Nerchinsk the area was assigned to Qing China.

Following the Treaty of Aigun in 1858 a new Amur Cossack stanitsa appeared on the site. A municipal museum is sited among the remains of the 17th-century Russian fort.

== History ==
In late 1650 Albazin was built as winter quarters by Yerofei Khabarov on the northernmost part of the Amur River, 125 miles downstream from the junction of the Argun and Shilka. Thereafter it was little used as the Russians concentrated on the richer grain-growing lands downriver. In 1652 the Manchus drove the Russians out of the Amur country and the land was left to outlaws and adventurers.

=== Foundation of Jaxa ===
In 1655 Nikifor Chernigovsky, a Pole who had been exiled to Siberia after an unsuccessful attempt to run away from the Russian's custody, murdered the voyevoda of Ilimsk in retaliation for the rape of his daughter, and fled to the Amur, where he reoccupied the ruins of Albazin and gathered a band of supporters. Chernigovsky soon gained the support of the local Tungusic population, whom he treated with respect, in contrast to several assaults they had suffered under Russian (Cossack) sovereignty. He made a great stronghold on the ruins of Albazin, giving it the name of Jaxa.

In the coming years, Siberian governors made several failed attempts to regain control over Albazin; however, Chernigovsky was able to keep his position by playing the Russians against the Chinese, and vice versa. From 1669, the Russian tsar received a tribute from the Jaxa country (Albazin and surrounding villages), which impacted the tsar's decision to formally acknowledge Chernigovsky as the lord of Jaxa in 1674. The Chinese government, for its part, communicated with Chernigovsky using Polish as the main language. In 1675, he raided Chinese lands with the help of the local population. This remains the last recorded reference to Chernigovsky in history.

=== Russian–Chinese conflict over Albazin ===
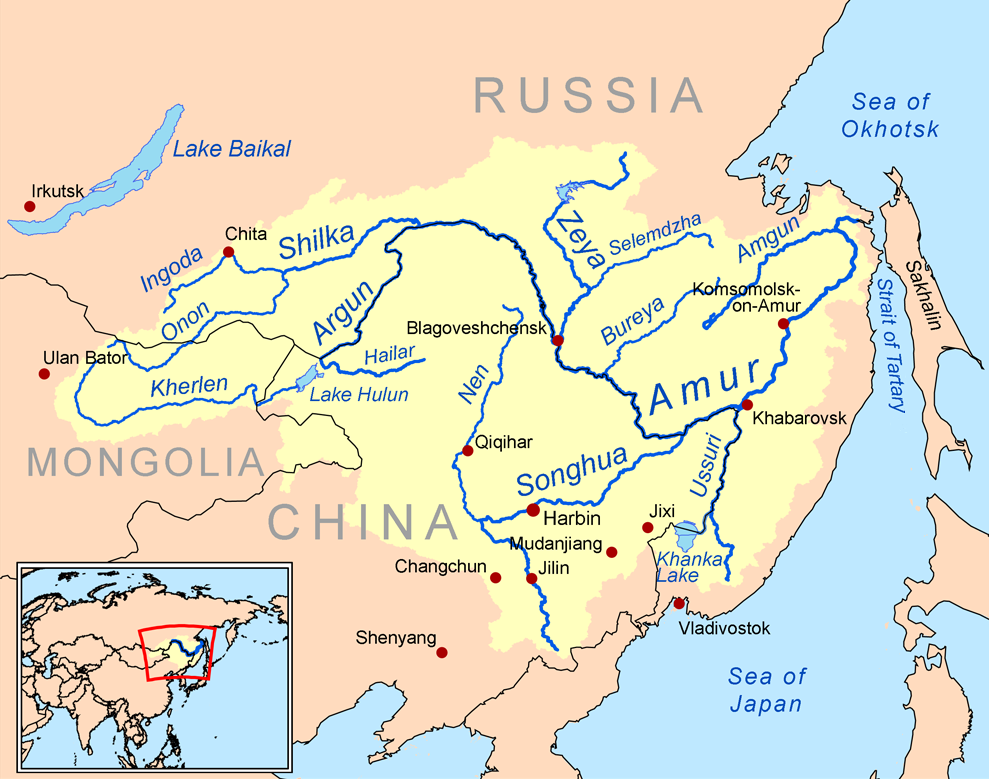
'Albazin is on the northern loop of the Amur. Nerchinsk is on the lower Shilka'

The Qing did little about Albazin because their forces were tied up in southern China and because they were concerned about possible Russian backing for their enemies in Mongolia. With the southern problem nearly solved (Taiwan was conquered in 1683), in the spring of 1682 the Kangxi Emperor made a tour through Manchuria and began preparations to deal with the Amur problem. His plan was to build up such a large force that the Russians would withdraw without fighting, for, as he said "The use of force is not a good thing. We use it only under compulsion." Troops were moved up to Aigun and crops were planted to feed them. An attack was delayed due to disagreements among the planners and the difficulty of moving supplies northward.

From 1681 there were Qing threats against Albazin, talks were held on the Nen River and minor Russian forts were destroyed along the Zeya. By the end of 1683 all Russian bases except Albazin had been eliminated. Moscow responded by making Ivan Vlasov voyevoda of Nerchinsk and appointing Aleksey Tolbuzin to a new voyevodstvo at Albazin (July 1684). An attempt to move men and supplies east failed due to shortages and inefficiency.

1685: The siege began on June 23, 1685. On the 26th there was an indecisive day-long battle. The Qing army thereupon piled dry wood along the fort's wooden walls and when they began to light it, Tolbuzin surrendered (exact date uncertain). The 600 or so defenders were allowed to withdraw to Nerchinsk. About 45 opted to go with the Qing army, then joined the Russian colony in Peking. The Qing army burned the fort and withdrew, but did not destroy the crops. When news of the defeat reached Moscow in November it was decided to abandon the Amur and send an ambassador to Peking. The Qing troops constituted of former Southern Ming marines from Taiwan, renowned for their knowledge of nautical warfare.

1686: One day after leaving Albazin, the retreating Russians met a group of reinforcements who brought word that an even larger group under Baiton had reached Nerchinsk. Since the fort was lost they continued their withdrawal. Some time after July 10, 1685, scouts reported that the Qing were gone and the crops still standing. Vlasov sent 669 well-armed men under Tolbuzin to gather the harvest. The crops were gathered, Albazin was refortified with earthen walls and efforts were made to bring the natives back into subjection. The Qing arrived on July 18, 1686, and began a tight siege and a steady cannonade. On the fifth day of the siege Tolbuzin was killed by a cannon ball and replaced by Afanasii Baiton. The Russians had enough food to last until Easter, but were short of water. The siege continued until early winter. In late October messengers arrived in Peking announcing Moscow's desire to negotiate. An order was issued to relax the siege. At this time less than 66 men, out of an original 826, were left alive (most had died of disease, especially scurvy). On December 25 Baiton sent one of his men to request provisions. A few more than twenty men remained in the fort, all ill and undernourished. When, in August 1687, Kangxi heard (incorrectly) that the Russian ambassador had reached Mongolia, he ordered the Qing troops withdrawn.

By the treaty of Nerchinsk (1689), Albazin was abandoned and destroyed.

== See also ==
- Albazinians
