= Symeon Du =

Last Eastern Orthodox bishop of Shanghai

His Grace Symeon
- Bishop of Shanghai
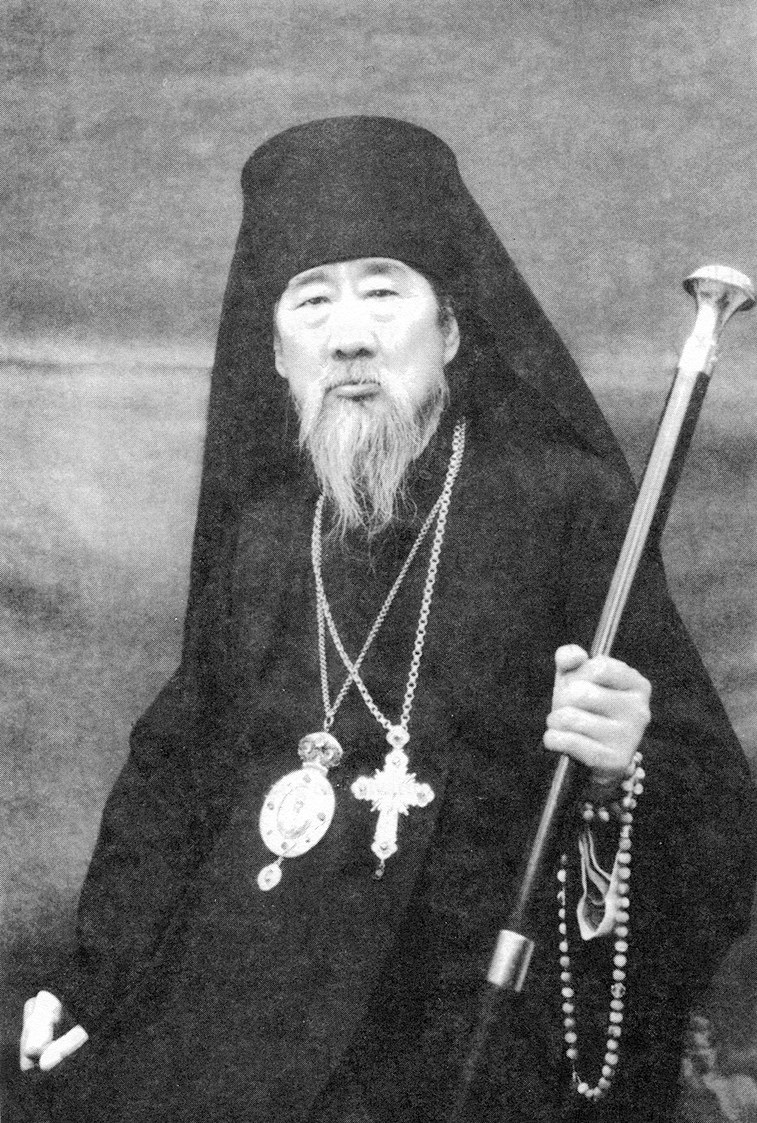
- Native name: Xi mái Du
- Church: Chinese Orthodox Church
- Appointed: 26 September 1950
- Predecessor: John (Maximovitch)
- Successor: Vacant
- Previous post: Bishop of Tianjin (1950)

Orders
- Ordination: 16 September 1941
- Consecration: 30 July 1950 by Alexey I (Simansky)

Personal details
- Born: Du Runchen; 11 February 1886 Beijing, China
- Died: 3 March 1965 (aged 79) Shanghai, People's Republic of China

Bishop Symeon (Chinese: 主敎西麥翁, born Du Runchen, Chinese: 杜潤臣, Russian name Fyodor Semyonovich Du, Russian: Фёдор Семёнович Ду; 11 February 1886 – 3 March 1965) was bishop of the Chinese Orthodox Church. He was the last Eastern Orthodox bishop of Shanghai before the abolition of the see.

== Biography ==
Du was born on 11 February 1886 in Beijing to a family of Albazinian origin. His father was a church reader. He and his family escaped during the Boxer Rebellion.

From 1902, he served as psalm reader at the Church of the Presentation of the Lord at the Russian Embassy in Beijing. In 1904, he graduated from the missionary school at the Russian Orthodox Mission in Beijing and for several years served as a psalm reader and catechist in the Yung-ping-fu area (Peitaiho).

In 1908, Bishop Innocent (Figurovsky), chief of the mission, ordained him a deacon. In 1909 Bishop Innocent appointed him to serve at the mission's metochion, the Annunciation Church, in Harbin. In addition to his duties as deacon, he served as a missionary, the treasurer, and manager of the parish's office in Harbin. With the arrival of many refugee Christians from Russia in 1919, he was active in publishing Russian textbooks for the schools in Harbin.

His life as a missionary took him to many cities in China, including Shanghai, Hankou, Haimen, Kaifeng, Weihou, and Mukden, as well as to localities in Manchuria. In 1932, he was assigned to duties in Tianjin where, in 1934, he was elevated to protodeacon.

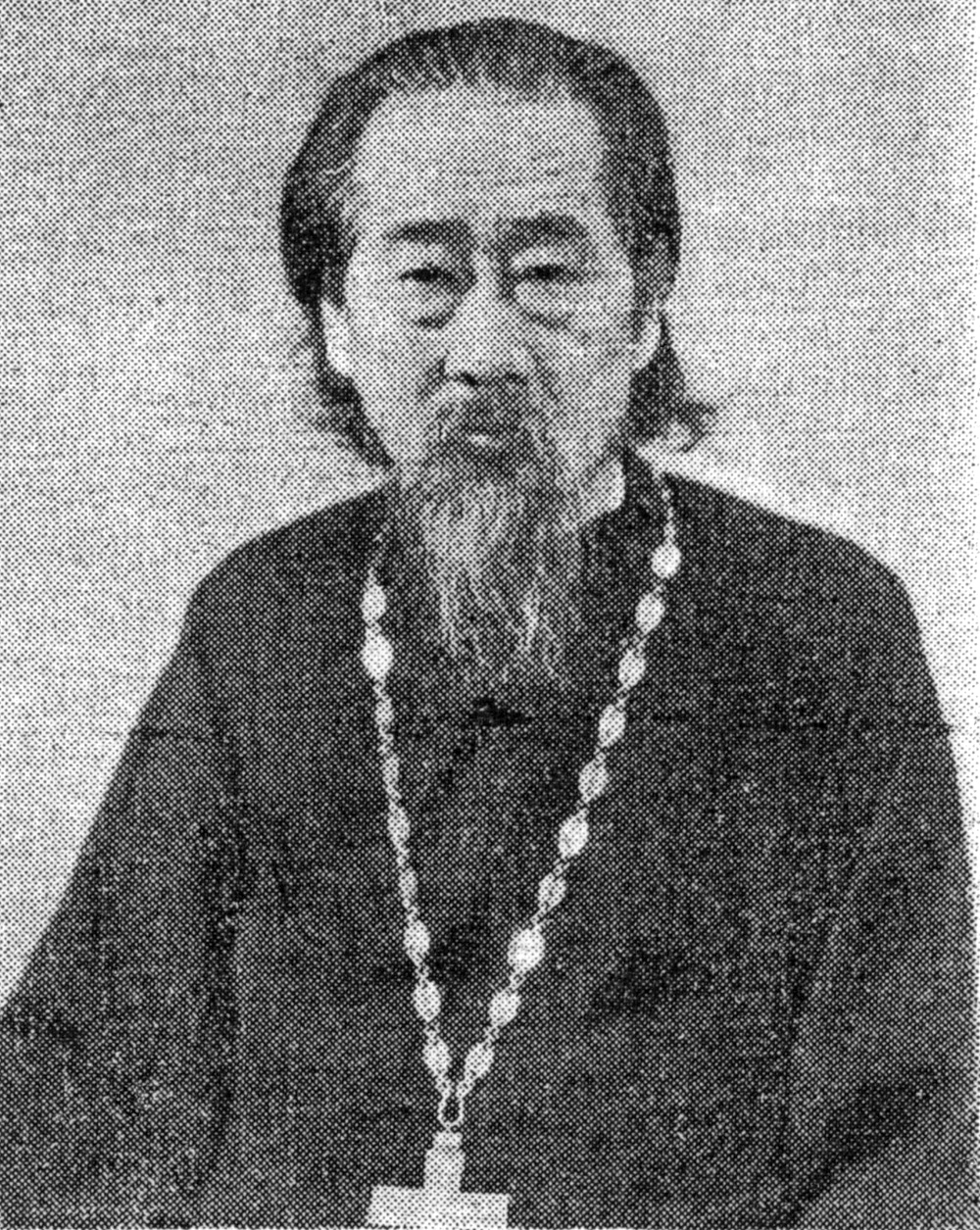
Symeon Du in 1947

On 16 September 1941, he was ordained to the priesthood and made priest-in-charge of the St. Innocent Mission Church in Tianjin. In 1943, he was elevated to archpriest and in 1945, he was awarded a "palitza". In early 1950, he traveled to the Soviet Union, where he accompanied Patriarch Alexey to a conference in Tbilisi, Georgia, of the Russian Orthodox Church, Georgian Orthodox Church, and Armenian Apostolic Church.

On 23 July 1950, at Trinity-Sergius Lavra, he was tonsured a monk with name Symeon. On July 23, he was raised to archimandrite. On 30 July in the Cathedral of the Annunciation in Moscow he was consecrated Bishop of Tianjin.

On 26 September 1950, Bishop Simeon was appointed as Bishop of Shanghai.

He died on 3 March 1965 in Shanghai.
