= Gantimurov family =

Russian family name

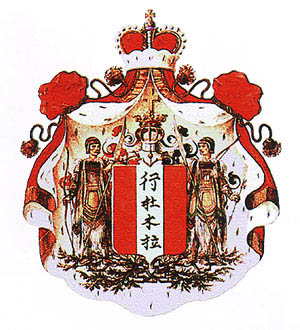
Coat of arms of Princes Gantimurov

The House of Gantimurov (Russian: Гантимуровы) is a Russian princely family of Evenks.

== History ==
The family comes from the eastern Siberian Dauriya and were already tribal chiefs of the Siberian-Transbaikalian Evenks and the Mongolian Daurian tribes in the 16th century. It is named after Gantimur (1610-1685), son of a chief of the Evenks and Daurians, whose name is derived from the Mongolian gan ("steel") and tömör ("iron").

Gantimur and his eldest son Katanai were baptized Russian Orthodox in 1684. In 1685 Katanai was accepted into the Russian nobility. He and his descendants received the title of prince (Knyaz) and were exempt from the yasak tax. They were granted a special salary. In 1686, Tsars Ivan V and Peter I confirmed the family's princely status with an ukase.

In the 1st half of the 18th century, the Gantimurov princes were known throughout Siberia for their wealth. In 1761 they established the village of Karymskoye in Dauria. The titled branch of the family is recorded in Part V of the Noble Genealogy Book of the Irkutsk Province (February 1786). Their heraldic emblem is contained in the 17th part of the Gerbovnik. Wassily Kandinsky's great-grandmother was born Princess Gantimurov.

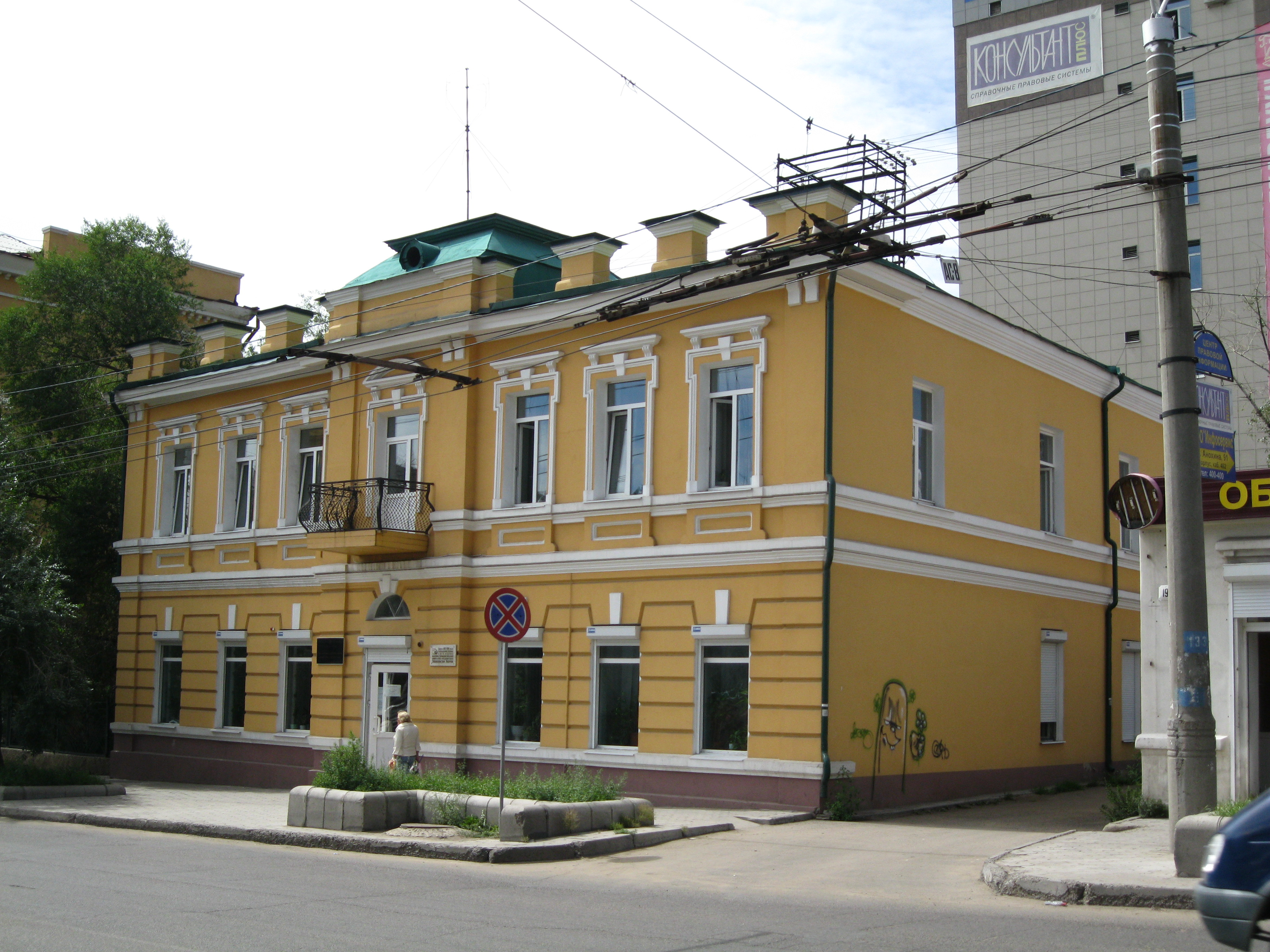
House of the Gantimurov family Chita

== Notable members ==
- Prince Nikolai Gantimurov (1880–1924), a Russian officer, took part in the Siege of Port Arthur.
- Natalia Gantimurova (born 1991), Russian model, is the Miss Russia 2011 titleholder.

== Literature ==
- (in English) Artemyev A. R. The Gantimurov Princes in Russian service // Suomalais-Ugrilaisen Seuran Aikakauskirja. Vol.84. Helsinki, 1992. P.7-8
- (in Russian) Соломин А. В. Князья Гантимуровы.- М., 2013
- (in Russian) Арсеньев Ю.В. Род князей Гантимуровых: Генеалогическая справка. М., 1904
- (in Russian) Дамдинов Д.Г. О предках Гантимуровых (титулованных князьях и дворянах по московскому списку).- Улан-Удэ, 1996
- (in Russian) Думин С.В. Князья Гантимуровы // Дворянские роды Российской империи.- Т.3.- М., 1996.- С.215-217
- (in Russian) Гантимуров Д.В. Историческая справка относительно рода князей Гантимуровых.- Иркутск, 1900
