= Chinese characters for transcribing Slavonic =

Chinese characters for transcribing Slavonic were Chinese characters created for the purpose of transcribing Slavonic sounds into Chinese. The Russian Orthodox Church's mission in China had an interest in translating liturgical texts into Chinese and Japanese, and sought to devise new characters for this purpose.

Many of these new characters were proposed by Archimandrite Gurias, the 14th head of the Russian mission from 1858–1864. They would have transcribed certain syllables normally not valid in standard Chinese phonology, such as vin, gi, or reia. These characters were later used for transcription into Japanese as well, with the character pronunciations changed to account for Japanese phonology. However, in both China and Japan, leaders of the Russian missions eventually decided to translate liturgical texts using standard vernacular Chinese and katakana, respectively.

The majority of the new characters were composed through combining two existing characters side-by-side as radicals, which would also indicate their pronunciation. Unlike the typical rule of pronouncing the character based on the side radical, used in pronouncing phono-semantic compounds, the radicals are presented in initial-rime pairs. In a method similar to Fanqie, the right-hand character would indicate the syllable initial, while the left-hand character would be used as an indicator of the final. This approach to character formation was intended for vertical reading, where the flow of the text is from top-to-bottom, and ordered from right-to-left. Two exceptions were vertically-arranged characters used as abbreviations of "Christ" and "Jesus".

Twenty Slavonic transcription characters were included in Unicode Standard version 10.0, in the range from U+9FD6 to U+9FE9.

== Examples ==
Character	Image	Construction	Unicode	Comment (Note: Small Chinese characters used in transcriptions indicate initial or final Slavonic consonants, while a small circle under Chinese characters indicates a stress on the syllable.)
鿦		⿰英微	U+9FE6; U+9FE6 鿦 CJK UNIFIED IDEOGRAPH-9FE6	Equivalent to vin (вин) as in Навин (Navin; Nun, 那鿦)
鿤		⿰耶格	U+9FE4; U+9FE4 鿤 CJK UNIFIED IDEOGRAPH-9FE4	Equivalent to ge (ге) as in Нигер (Niger; Niger, 尼鿤爾)
鿚		⿰伊格	U+9FDA; U+9FDA 鿚 CJK UNIFIED IDEOGRAPH-9FDA	Equivalent to gi (ги) as in Сергия (Sergiâ; Sergius, 些爾鿚乙)
鿣		⿰耶克	U+9FE3; U+9FE3 鿣 CJK UNIFIED IDEOGRAPH-9FE3	Equivalent to ke (ке) as in Кесария (Kesariâ; Caesarea, 鿣薩鿠亞)
鿙		⿰伊克	U+9FD9; U+9FD9 鿙 CJK UNIFIED IDEOGRAPH-9FD9	Equivalent to ki (ки) as in Езекия (Ezekiâ; Hezekiah, 耶捷鿙亞)
鿜		⿰拉爾	U+9FDC; U+9FDC 鿜 CJK UNIFIED IDEOGRAPH-9FDC	Equivalent to ra (ра) as in Израиль (Izrailʹ; Israel, 伊斯鿜伊利)
鿥		⿰郎爾	U+9FE5; U+9FE5 鿥 CJK UNIFIED IDEOGRAPH-9FE5	Equivalent to ran (ран) as in Аран (Aran; Haran, 哈爾鿥)
鿞		⿰列爾	U+9FDE; U+9FDE 鿞 CJK UNIFIED IDEOGRAPH-9FDE	Equivalent to re (ре) as in Назарет (Nazaret; Nazareth, 那匝鿞特)
鿝		⿰楞爾	U+9FDD; U+9FDD 鿝 CJK UNIFIED IDEOGRAPH-9FDD	Equivalent to ren (рен) as in Терентий (Terentij; Terence, 鐵鿝提乙)
鿨		⿰雷爾	U+9FE8; U+9FE8 鿨 CJK UNIFIED IDEOGRAPH-9FE8	Equivalent to reia (рея) as in назареянин (nazareânin; Nazarene, 那作鿨)
鿠		⿰利爾	U+9FE0; U+9FE0 鿠 CJK UNIFIED IDEOGRAPH-9FE0	Equivalent to ri (ри) as in Христос (Hristos; Christ, 合鿠斯托斯); can also represent a final l in Japanese transcriptions.
鿟		⿰利尔	U+9FDF; U+9FDF 鿟 CJK UNIFIED IDEOGRAPH-9FDF	Simplified variant of 鿟. Same usage as the traditional ri.
鿛		⿰凌爾	U+9FDB; U+9FDB 鿛 CJK UNIFIED IDEOGRAPH-9FDB	Equivalent to rin (рин) as in Коринф (Korinf; Corinth, 适鿛福)
鿡		⿰羅爾	U+9FE1; U+9FE1 鿡 CJK UNIFIED IDEOGRAPH-9FE1	Equivalent to ro (ро) as in романский (romanskij; Roman, 鿡瑪)
鿧		⿰隆爾	U+9FE7; U+9FE7 鿧 CJK UNIFIED IDEOGRAPH-9FE7	Equivalent to ron (рон) as in Аарон (Aaron; Aaron, 阿阿鿧)
鿩		⿰魯爾	U+9FE9; U+9FE9 鿩 CJK UNIFIED IDEOGRAPH-9FE9	Equivalent to ru (ру) as in Иерусалим (Ierusalim; Jerusalem, 耶鿩薩利木)
鿢		⿰耶合	U+9FE2; U+9FE2 鿢 CJK UNIFIED IDEOGRAPH-9FE2	Equivalent to khe (хе) as in Сихем (Sihem; Shechem, 西鿢木)
鿘		⿰伊合	U+9FD8; U+9FD8 鿘 CJK UNIFIED IDEOGRAPH-9FD8	Equivalent to khi (хи) as in Мелхий (Melhij; Melchi, 羋利鿘乙)
鿖		⿱合一	U+9FD6; U+9FD6 鿖 CJK UNIFIED IDEOGRAPH-9FD6	Abbreviation for the word Христос (Hristos; Christ). The full form in Classical Chinese would be 合鿠斯托斯.
鿗		⿳人伊一	U+9FD7; U+9FD7 鿗 CJK UNIFIED IDEOGRAPH-9FD7	Abbreviation for the word Иисус (Iisus; Jesus). The full form in Classical Chinese would be 伊伊穌斯
