= Nicefor Czernichowski =

Polish noble (died 1675)

Nicefor Chernichowski
- Coat of arms: Jaxa
- Born: early 17th century Czerniachów, Polish–Lithuanian Commonwealth (now Cherniakhiv, Ukraine)
- Died: Jaxa (now Albazino, Russia); 1675

Jaxa Coat of Arms

Nicefor Chernichowski (also known as Jaxa-Czernichowski and Czernihowski; Russian: Никифор Романович Черниговский; died 1675) was a Polish noble of Ruthenian origin, who was exiled to Siberia over the course of the Smolensk War. In 1665, he murdered the voivode of Ilimsk for raping his daughter, and fled to the Amur where he reoccupied the ruins of Albazin and gathered a band of supporters, forming a settlement of fugitives called "Jaxa".

== Life ==
Nicefor Czernichowski became a Russian prisoner in 1633 during the battle near Novhorod-Siverskyi (most likely together with his father, Roman); his name was mentioned in the Russian chronicle Razriad. In August 1633 he was exiled to Vologda. Due to a peace treaty ending the Polish-Russian war in 1634 he was entitled to be liberated. As he married a woman from Moscow, he initially intended to stay in Muscovy; he swore loyalty to the Tsar and in 1635 he converted to Orthodoxy.

He later changed his mind and in the company of seven companions, he headed towards the Polish border. He may or may not been aware that he was no longer entitled to return to his homeland, at least in the eyes of the Tsar. On 3 July 1636, he was captured and exiled to Yeniseysk, arriving in 1637 and accompanied by his wife. In 1649, he was sent further east to Ilimsk, then to Ust-Kut and Kirensk. He went on to have three sons and two daughters during this time. In 1656 he became a Cossack leader. His address to Tsar to restore his noble status was left unanswered in 1657.

== Jaxa ==
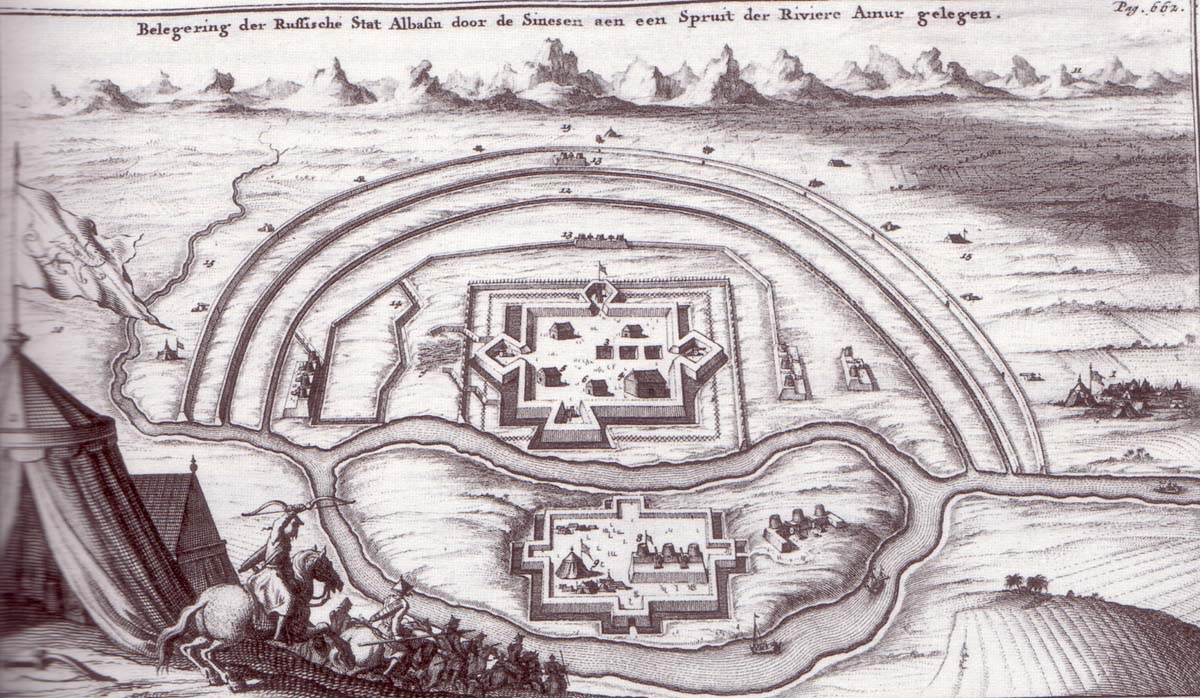
Qing troops besieging Albazin in 1686

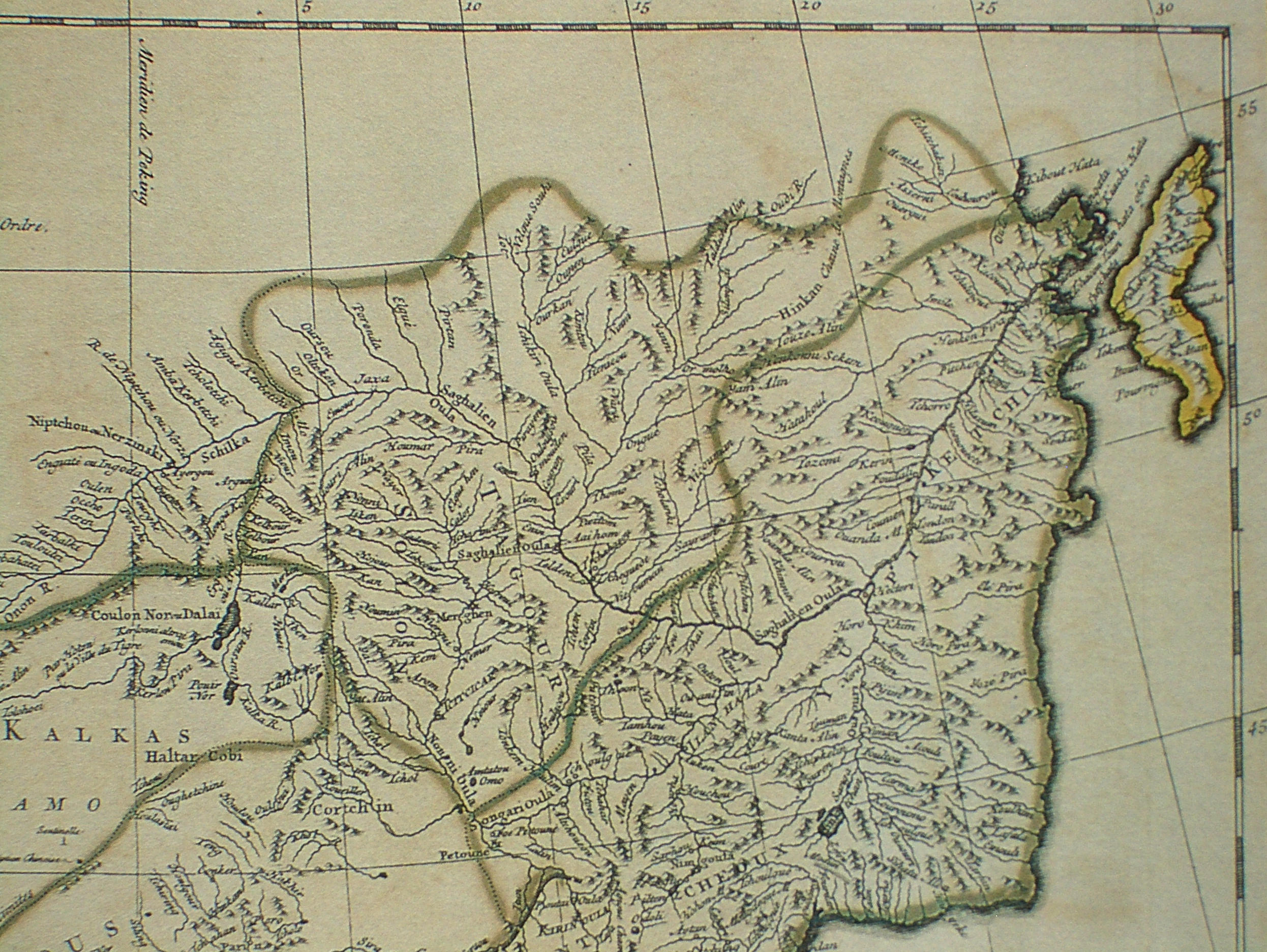
The former site of Albazin marked (as Yaxa) on an early 18th-century French map

In 1632, during the Smolensk War, Czernihowski was taken prisoner by the Muscovites; subsequently, persuaded by Cossack comrades in Muscovite service, he decided not to return to the Polish-Lithuanian Commonwealth but to join them instead. He soon regretted this decision and attempted to desert and return to his homeland; however, he was captured during his flight and exiled to Siberia to serve in the local Cossack units. There, he rose through the ranks, eventually becoming a Cossack commander. A dramatic turn of events occurred in 1665 when Czernihowski’s daughter was raped by Lavrenty Obukhov, the voivode (governor) of Ilimsk. In retaliation, the rapist was killed by the girl’s brothers and their associates. Ultimately, nearly a hundred Cossacks, peasants, and drifters fled with Czernihowski to the Amur River, where they rebuilt the fortress of Albazin, which the Russians had abandoned twenty years earlier. In Romantic Polish historiography, this deed is elevated to the status of founding an independent state named "Jaksa"—after Czernihowski’s alleged coat of arms—on the no-man's-land between Russia and China. In reality, although he was a nobleman, he did not bear such a coat of arms, and "Jaksa" is actually a Manchu term for a river inlet. In reality, the fugitives made no attempt to establish a state entity; instead, they merely collected tribute from local peoples and negotiated with Tsarist officials, offering continued service on the Amur in exchange for a pardon for the voivode's killing and acts of river piracy—including the looting of the state treasury. In 1669, Nicefor Czernichowski formally acknowledged the Tsar's suzerainty. In 1672, Tsar Alexis I Romanov issued decrees—first formally sentencing Czernichowski to death for the earlier killing of the Tsarist voivode Obukhov, and then, two days later, pardoning him, granting him a reward, and appointing him deputy voivode of Albazin. In 1674, Jaxa was definitively and permanently incorporated into the Tsardom. Czernichowski was already dead when, after two sieges of the settlement, the Russians decided to withdraw from the Amur region once again.
