= Ivan Chmutov =

Russian painter

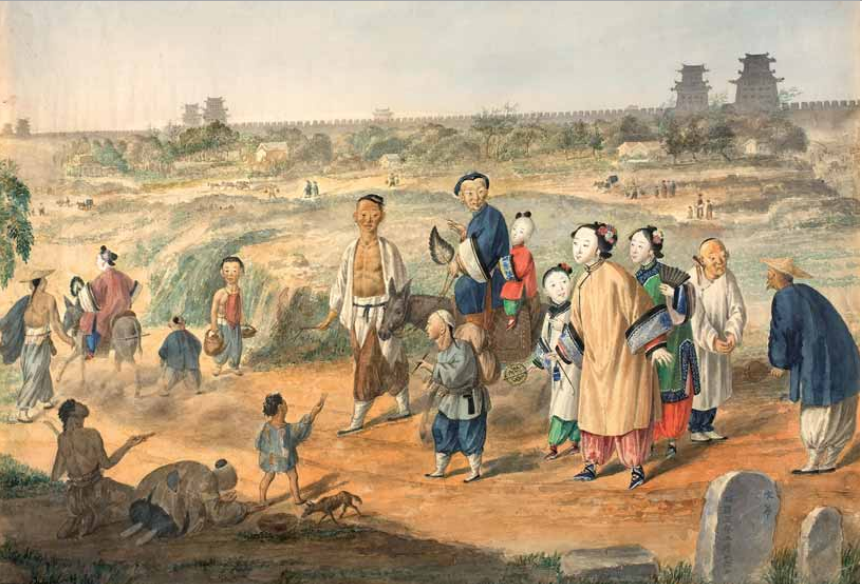
Behind the Walls of Beijing

Ivan Ivanovich Chmutov (Russian: Иван Иванович Чмутов; 17 October 1817, in Saint Petersburg – 31 March 1865, in Saint Petersburg) was a Russian painter in several genres; notably historical and religious scenes.

== Biography ==
It is generally believed that he was born in Saint Petersburg. In 1836, he is listed in the registry of students at the Imperial Academy of Arts; in the history and portrait painting class of Fyodor Bruni. The following year, he was awarded a silver medal for "drawing from nature" and later won a gold medal for his depiction of Joseph interpreting the prisoner's dreams. He continued with Pyotr Basin when Bruni returned to Italy in 1838.

In 1839, he received a gold medal and 1000 Rubles for his painting "Healing the Paralytic" and was awarded the title of "Free Artist". He failed to win the gold medals at exhibitions in 1841 and 1844. Two years later, he travelled to Italy at his own expense, but could not remain long.

In 1848, he was named an "Academician" but, shortly after, he enlisted in the thirteenth Russian Spiritual Mission to Beijing, becoming the mission's official artist. He arrived in China in 1850 and was there for eight years. While there, he made numerous sketches and watercolors of genre scenes. Many of them were made into lithographs and published in two works by Yegor Kovalevsky; "Journey to China" (1853) and "Russian Art Sheets" (1858).

In 1860, he presented an exhibition at the Academy, featuring portraits of various Chinese noblemen, government officials and their wives.
