= General Armorial of the Noble Families of the Russian Empire =

Register of arms of the Russian noble families

General Armorial of the Noble Families of the All-Russian Empire
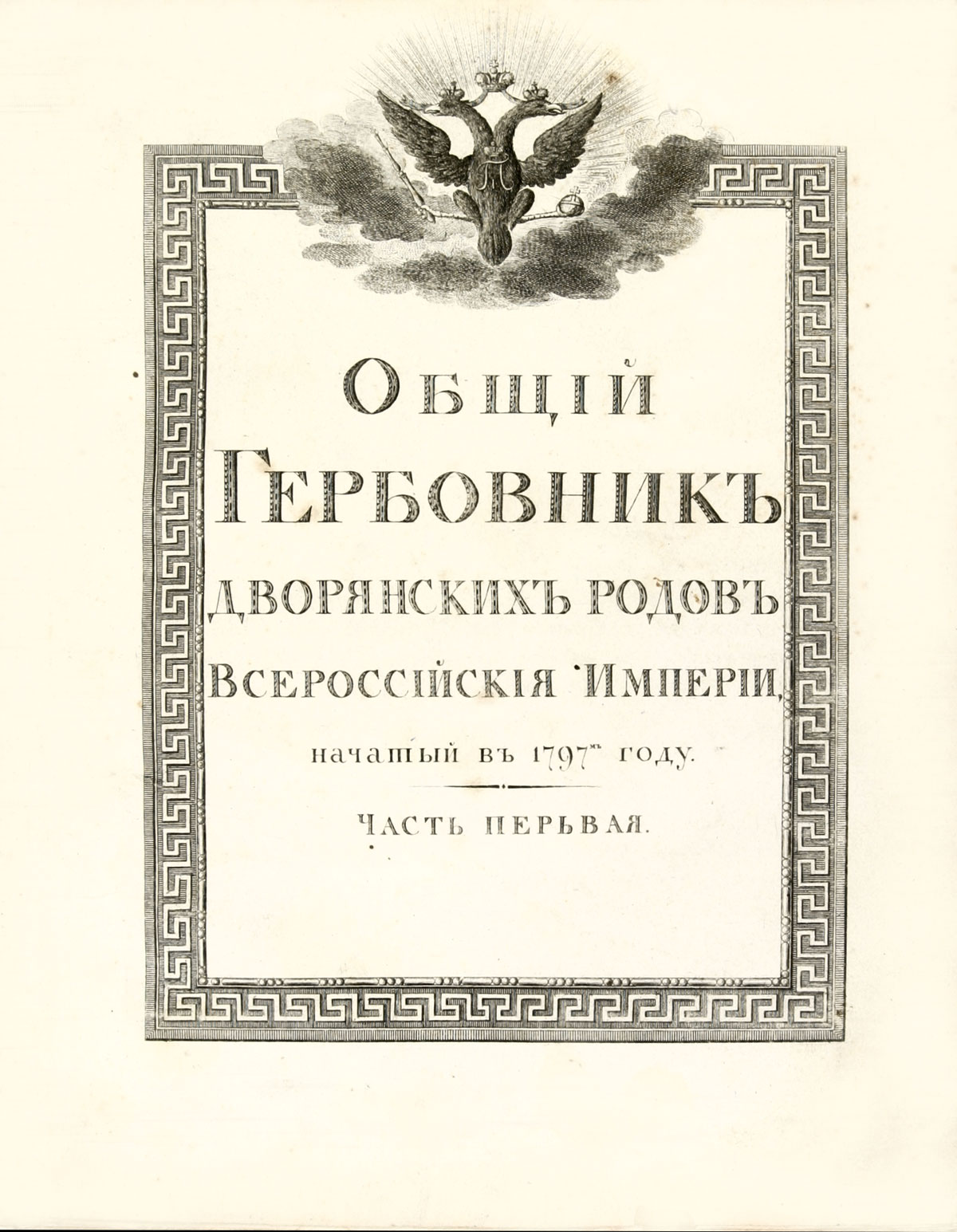
- Original title: Общий Гербовник дворянских родов Всероссийской Империи
- Language: Russian
- Genre: Heraldry reference book
- Publication date: 1798–1917

The General Armorial of the Noble Families of the Russian Empire is the register of arms of the Russian noble families, established by decree of Emperor Paul I of January 31, 1797.

== Manifesto ==
Twenty volumes of the coats of arms include 3,066 inheritable arms and several personal emblems.

1. All emblems entered into the [book of] coat of arms should be left forever indispensable so that without our special command or successors of our command, nothing would be excluded from any of them and again nothing would be added to them.
2. To each nobleman of the kind whose coat of arms is in the Armorial [...] issue exact copies from the coat of arms of its kind and from the description located on the parchment behind the clip.
3. In cases in which the need will prove to someone the dignity of his family, take the Register of Arms compiled by order of our common noble families, which will be stored in our Senate.

— The Manifesto of January 20, 1797

== Parts of the General Armorial ==
Five parts of the General Armorial were approved by Emperor Paul I:

- The first part – January 1, 1798 (150 emblems);
- The second part – June 30, 1798 (150 emblems);
- The third part – January 19, 1799 (150 emblems);
- The fourth part – December 7, 1799 (150 emblems);
- The fifth part – October 22, 1800 (150 emblems).

Emperor Alexander I approved:

- The sixth part – June 23, 1801 (160 emblems);
- The seventh part – October 4, 1803 (180 emblems);
- The eighth part – January 25, 1807 (160 emblems);
- The ninth part – August 5, 1816 (160 emblems).

The tenth part was approved almost twenty years later, on January 3, 1836, by Nicholas I (152 emblems).

The first four parts of the General Armorial were printed in Saint Petersburg in 1803–1809. Parts five through ten were published in 1836–1840 in the amount of 600 copies. The arms were engraved in black and white. A few years ago, a facsimile reprint of the first three parts of the General Armorial was undertaken from the publication of 1803–1809.

The following ten parts have not been published and exist in a single copy.

Emperor Alexander II approved the eleventh part – April 13, 1857 (153 emblems).

Emperor Alexander III approved:

- The twelfth part – May 23, 1882 (152 coats of arms);
- The thirteenth part – January 19, 1885 (186 emblems);
- The fourteenth part – April 11, 1890 (170 emblems).

Emperor Nicholas II approved:

- The fifteenth part – March 29, 1895 (143 emblems);
- The sixteenth part – February 14, 1901 (140 emblems);
- The seventeenth part – January 14, 1904 (140 emblems);
- The eighteenth part – January 9, 1908 (143 emblems);
- The nineteenth part – June 12, 1914 (142 emblems);
- The twentieth part – February 3, 1917 (135 emblems).

A collection of 61 emblems approved by the Governing Senate from June 1 to November 22, 1917, is called the twenty-first part of the General Armorial.

== Armorial decorations ==
The Armorial was supposed to emphasize the importance of entering the emblems of noble families on its pages. It was a highly solemn act of legalization of the emblem of the clan or face. Significance was enhanced by the personal signature of emperors in the approval of each coat of arms. Therefore, the volumes of the General Armorial should look as impressive as possible in order to emphasize this significance. For all volumes the design is characterized by the use of the state coat of arms – a two-headed eagle. The appearance of the originals of the first 10 parts of the General Armorial is as follows: each volume (size 40x25 cm) is bound in dark raspberry velvet (the successor to the Velvet Book), the images of a state eagle are embroidered on the outside of the binding, a silver meander coils along the blue field of the frontispiece enclosed in a frame. On this sheet, an entry is made about the approval of the corresponding part of the Armorial. This is followed by coats of arms, drawn on parchment sheets arranged with green taffeta and the text is placed under the coat of arms. Over time, the appearance of the General Armorial has changed. So, the 11th part looked different than the first 10 parts. The image of the state emblem was embroidered on the top cover, the spine was embroidered with gold and silk. From the 12th part, the sheets are transferred with translucent paper, and in the following parts the parchment is replaced with thick Bristol paper. All volumes are stored in case-boxes, covered in black leather with handles, for convenience and safety during transportation. Volume 21 of the General Armorial part was bound in 1919, and at the same time a case was made for it. This last volume is a red velvet book depicting the coat of arms of the period of the Provisional Government. The sheets of the General Stamp of the 21st part are arranged with taffeta.

== After 1917 ==
In 1992, the Russian Nobility Assembly began to publish the New General Armorial (30 emblems), which was to be a continuation of the General Armorial. The New General Armorial was published in the form of individual newspaper publications; the publication was not completed and stopped already in 1993.

In 2013, Maria Romanova resumed the practice of approving the next parts of the General Armorial, approving:

- The twenty-first – July 16, 2013 (61 emblems);
- The twenty-second – July 16, 2013 (170 emblems);
- The twenty-third – June 11, 2016.

Volume 21 is a collection of emblems approved in 1917 under the Provisional Government (see above), and volume 22 contains emblems approved by the Vladimiroviches (Kirill Vladimirovich, Vladimir Kirillovich and Maria Vladimirovna) in 1933–2012. Also in 2013, Maria Romanova decided to "resume the publication of the General Armorial and, after the publication of this twenty-second part, prepare for publication 11–21 volumes compiled in 1857–1917 and remaining in the manuscript". Volume 22 was published in 2017.

== See also ==
- Gothic Almanac
