= Treaty of Nerchinsk =

1689 border treaty between Russia and Qing China

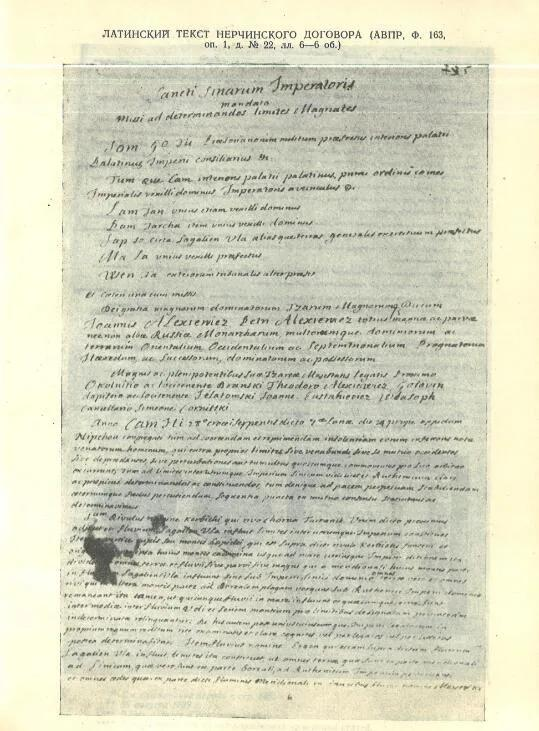
- A copy of the Treaty of Nerchinsk in Latin
- Type: Border treaty
- Signed: 27 August 1689; 337 years ago
- Location: Nerchinsk
- Expiration: 28 May 1858; 168 years ago
- Negotiators: (Tsardom of Russia) Fyodor Alexeyevich Golovin; (Qing dynasty) Songgotu
- Signatories: (Tsardom of Russia) Ivan V; (Qing dynasty) Kangxi Emperor
- Parties: Tsardom of Russia; Qing dynasty
- Languages: Latin; Russian; Manchu

Full text at Wikisource
- la:Pactum Nertschiae; ru:Нерчинский договор (1689); zh:尼布楚條約

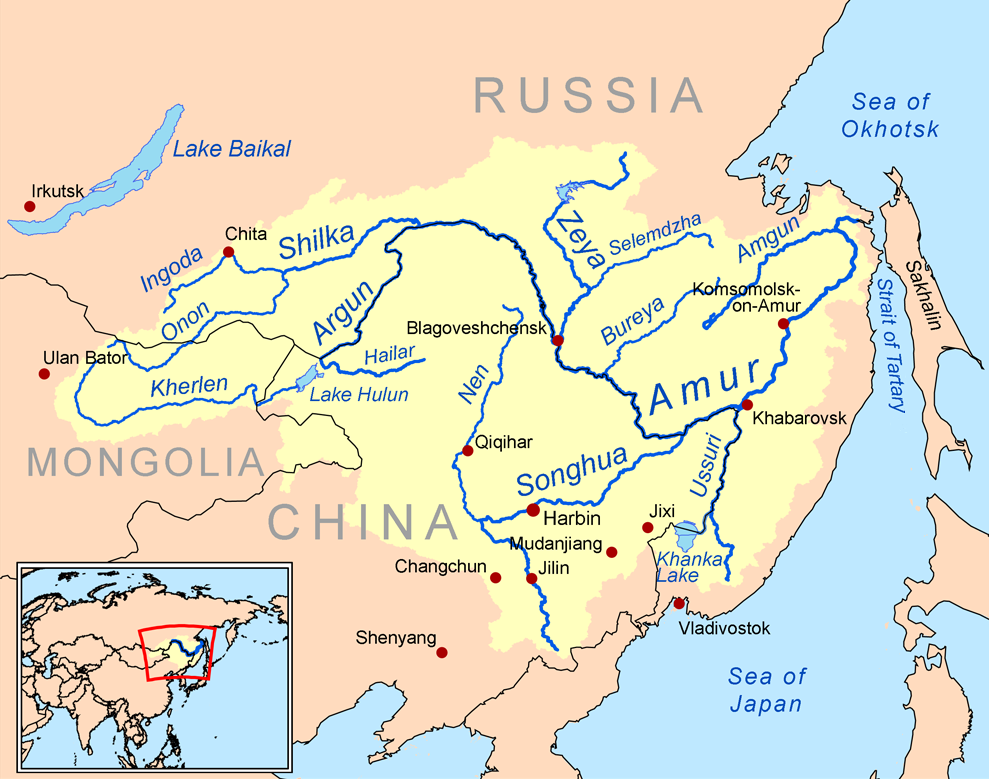
The Amur basin. Nerchinsk is partway up the Shilka. The Stanovoy Range extends along the northern edge of the Amur basin.

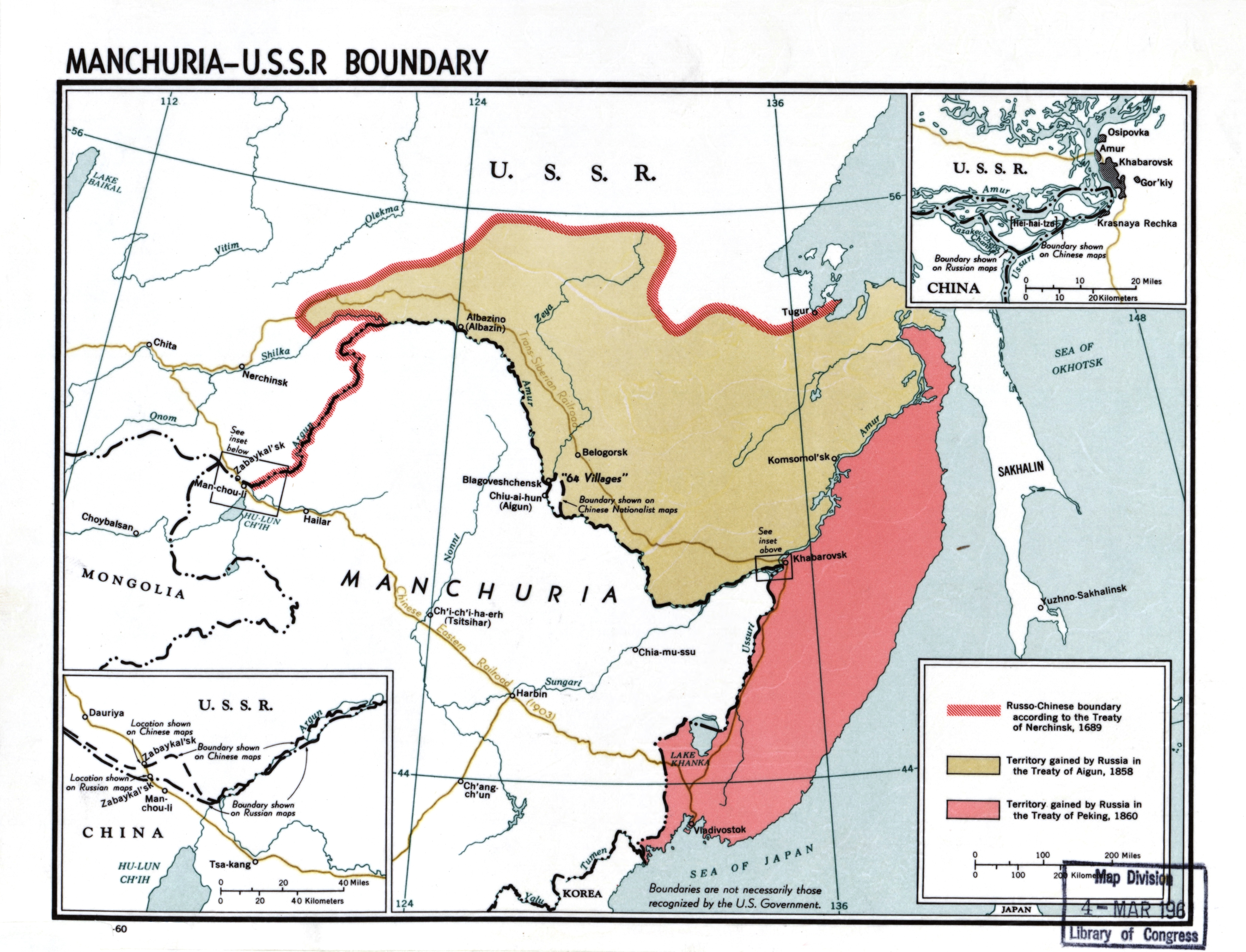
Changes in the Russo-Chinese border in the 17th–19th centuries

The Treaty of Nerchinsk was a peace treaty signed between the Tsardom of Russia and the Qing dynasty following Russia's defeat at the Siege of Albazin. Signed on 27 August 1689 by Songgotu on behalf of the Kangxi Emperor and Fyodor Golovin for Russian Tsars Peter I and Ivan V, it was the first formal treaty China ever signed with a Western power. To bypass translation issues and avoid misinterpretation, the authoritative version was written in Latin, with secondary translations made into Russian and Manchu. While no official Chinese text existed for another two centuries, physical border markers were inscribed in Chinese, Manchu, Russian, and Latin.

The geopolitical terms of the treaty forced the Russians to yield the territory north of the Amur River up to the Stanovoy Range, while allowing them to retain control over the region between the Argun River and Lake Baikal. This established boundary effectively halted Russian expansion in the region for nearly two centuries and opened vital markets for Russian goods in China, granting the Tsardom direct access to Chinese supplies and luxuries. The framework was later reconfirmed and expanded upon by the 1727 Treaty of Kiakhta, which delineated what is now the border of Mongolia west of the Argun River and legally opened up the caravan trade network.

This territorial arrangement lasted until the mid-19th century, when a weakened Qing faced the Amur Annexation by an expanding Russian Empire. Through the Treaty of Aigun in 1858, Russia annexed the lands north of the Amur, and subsequently seized the Pacific coast down to Vladivostok via the Convention of Peking in 1860. Unlike the mutual compromises of 1689, these later agreements were unequal treaties dictated by Russia, stripping China of its regional sovereignty while granting total immunity and control to Russia. Today, the modern international border between the two nations runs along the Argun, Amur, and Ussuri rivers.

== Names ==
Treaty of Nerchinsk is written in other languages as follows:

- Latin: Pactum Nertschiae
- Russian: Нерчинский договор (transliteration: Nerčinskij dogovor)
- Manchu: ᠨᡳᠪᠴᡠ ‍‍ᡳ
  ᠪᠣᠵᡳ
  ᠪᡳᡨᡥᡝ, 'Treaty of Nibuchu', (Möllendorff transliteration: nibcu-i boji bithe)
- simplified Chinese: 尼布楚条约; traditional Chinese: 尼布楚條約; pinyin: Níbùchǔ Tiáoyuē; lit. 'Treaty of Nibuchu'

== History ==
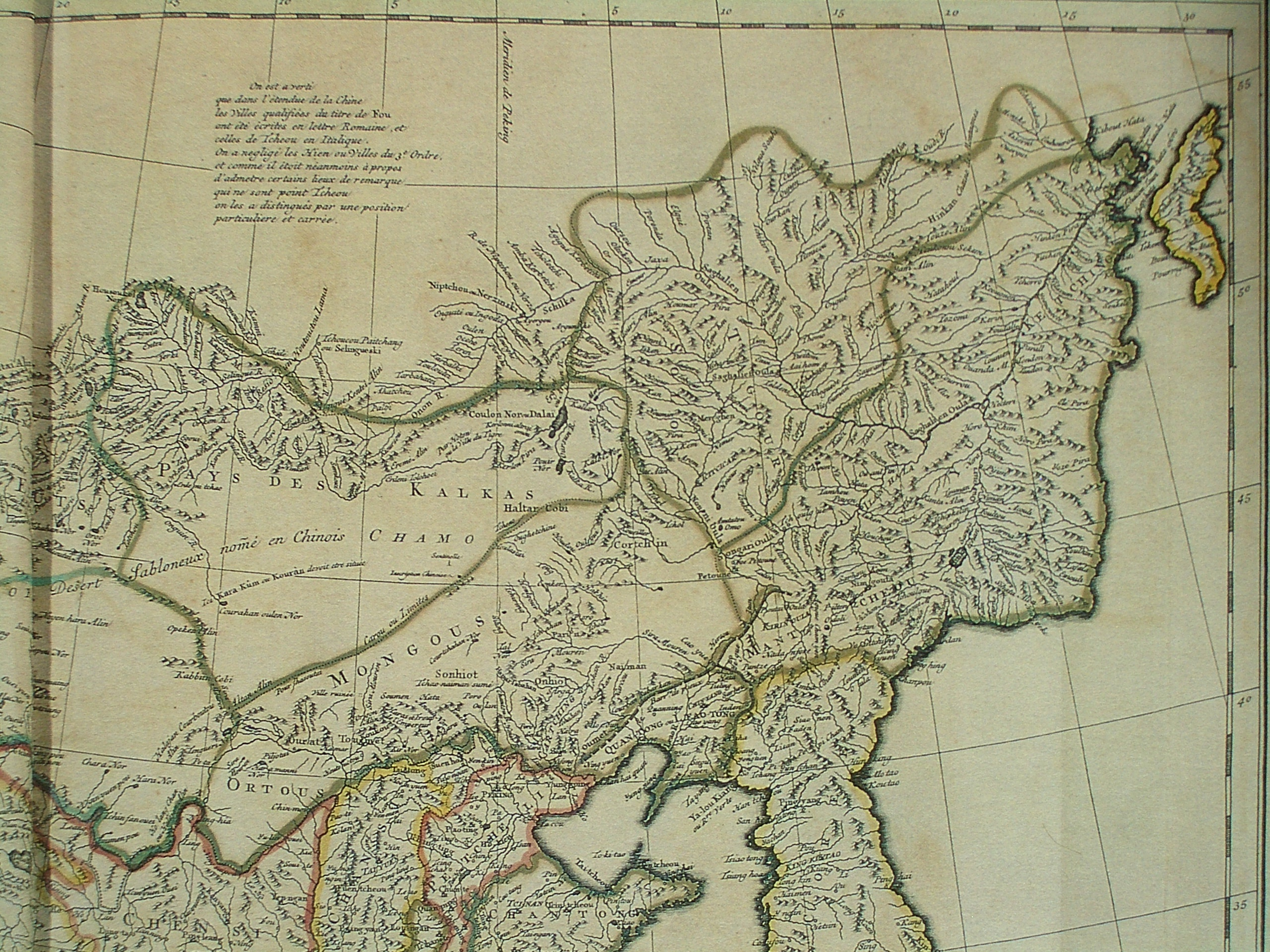
The northern border of "Chinese Tartary", as shown on this map from 1734, was more or less the Sino-Russian border line settled at Nerchinsk. Nerchinsk itself is shown on the map (on the Russian side of the border) as well.

The Qing Empire with provinces in yellow, military governorates and protectorates in green, tributary states in orange.

From about 1640, Russians entered the Amur basin from the north, into land claimed by the Qing dynasty which at this time were just beginning their conquest of the Ming dynasty. The Qing had, by the 1680s, completed the conquest of China proper and eliminated the last Ming successor states in the south. With the Qing dynasty now firmly in control of China, it was in a position to deal with what they saw as Russian encroachment in Manchuria, the ancient homeland of the ruling Aisin Gioro clan. By 1685 most of the Russians had been driven out of the area.

After their first victory at Albazin in 1685, the Qing government sent two letters to the Tsar (in Latin) suggesting peace and demanding that Russian freebooters leave the Amur. The Russian government, knowing that the Amur could not be defended and being more concerned with events in the west, sent Fyodor Golovin east as plenipotentiary. Golovin left Moscow in January 1686 with 500 streltsy and reached Selenginsk near Lake Baikal in October 1687, whence he sent couriers ahead. It was agreed the meeting would be in Selenginsk in 1688. At this point the Oirats (western Mongols) under Galdan attacked the eastern Mongols in the area between Selenginsk and Peking and negotiations had to be delayed. To avoid the fighting Golovin moved east to Nerchinsk where it was agreed that talks would take place. Qing troops with a size of 3,000 to 15,000 soldiers under the command of Songgotu left Peking on June 1689 and arrived in July. Talks went on from August 22 to September 6.

The language used was Latin, the translators being, for the Russians, a Pole named Andrei Bielobocki and for the Chinese the Jesuits Jean-Francois Gerbillon and Thomas Pereira. To avoid problems of precedence, tents were erected side by side so that neither side would be seen as visiting the other. Russian acceptance of the treaty required a relaxation of what had been, in Ming times, an iron rule of Chinese diplomacy, requiring the non-Chinese party to accept language which characterized the foreigner as an inferior or tributary. The conspicuous absence of such language from the Treaty, together with the absence of Chinese language or personnel, suggests that the Kangxi Emperor was using the Manchu language to circumvent his conservative Han bureaucracy. The Yuan dynasty's rule of Mongol tribes living around Lake Baikal was claimed by the Qing, who incited the defection of the Nerchinsk Onggut and Buryat Mongols away from the Russians.

The Qing dynasty wished to remove the Russians from the Amur. They were interested in the Amur since it was the northern border of the original Manchu heartland. They could ignore the area west of the Argun since it was then controlled by the Oirats. The Kangxi Emperor also wished to settle with Russia in order to free his hands to deal with the Dzungar Mongols of Central Asia, to his northwest. The Qing dynasty also wanted a delineated frontier to keep nomads and outlaws from fleeing across the border.

The Russians, for their part, knew that the Amur was indefensible and were more interested in establishing profitable trade, which the Kangxi Emperor had threatened to block unless the border dispute were resolved. Golovin accepted the loss of the Amur in exchange for possession of Trans-Baikalia and access to Chinese markets for Russian traders. The Russians were also concerned with the military strength of the Qing dynasty, who had demonstrated their capability, in 1685 and 1686, by twice overrunning the Russian outpost at Albazin.

At this time, Russia could not send large forces to the Far East, as they were launching a war with the Ottoman Empire. At the same time, the Dzungars captured Mongolia, threatening the Qing dynasty, so Russia and Qing dynasty were inclined to sign a peace treaty as soon as possible.

== The border ==
The agreed boundary was the Argun River north to its confluence with the Shilka River, up the Shilka to the "Gorbitsa River", up the Gorbitsa to its headwaters, then along the east-west watershed through the Stanovoy Mountains and down the Uda River (Khabarovsk Krai) to the Sea of Okhotsk at its southwest corner.

The border west of the Argun was not defined (at the time, this area was controlled by the Oirats). Neither side had very exact knowledge of the course of the Uda River. The Gorbitsa is hard to find on modern maps.

== Articles ==
The treaty had six articles:

- Articles I and II: the border was to follow the Shilka River up to the Gorbitsa River, until it reached its headwaters; it then ran along the watershed. The control over the area between the Uda River and the mountain chain was left to be decided later. The remaining section of the border was defined along the Argun River, until it met the Shilka (forming the Amur).
- Article III: the fortified town of Albazin was to be abandoned and destroyed.
- Article IV: fugitives from either side who had settled before the treaty would stay, while those arriving after the treaty had to be handed back.
- Article V: travel and trade across the frontier would to be allowed with proper documents.
- Article VI: if subjects of either nation crossed the frontier for unlawful purposes, they were to be sent back and prosecuted by their respective country.

The treaty concluded with both parties agreeing to place boundary stones along the new border.

== Economic aspects ==
The treaty was "a triumph of intercultural negotiation" that gave Russians access to Chinese markets for expensive furs; Russians purchased porcelain, silk, gold, silver, and tea as well as provisions for the northern garrisons. The cross-border trade gave a multiethnic character to Nerchinsk and Kyakhta in Siberia. They became locales for the interaction of Russian, Central Asian, and Chinese cultures. The trade extended European economic expansion deep into Asia. Profitable trade fell off in the 1720s because the policies of Peter I limited private initiative and ended Siberia's role as a major economic link between the West and East.

== Later developments ==
Russian interest in the Amur River was revived in the 1750s. In 1757 Fedor Ivanovich Soimonov was sent to map the area. He mapped the Shilka, which was partly in Chinese territory, but was turned back when he reached its confluence with the Argun. In 1757 Vasili Fedorovich Bradishchev was sent to Peking to investigate the possibility of using the Amur. He was received cordially and given a definite no. After that the matter was dropped.

In 1799, when Adam Johann von Krusenstern visited Canton he saw an English ship that had brought furs from Russian America in five months as opposed to the two years or more for the Okhotsk–Yakutsk–Kyakhta route. He saw that this could replace the overland trade. He submitted a memoir to the Naval Ministry which led to his command of the first Russian circumnavigation. He was able to sell American furs at Canton after some official resistance. Only when he returned to Kronstadt did he learn that his presence in Canton had provoked an edict making clear that Russian trade with the Middle Kingdom would be confined to Kyakhta.

For the rest see Treaty of Kyakhta and Amur Annexation.

== See also ==
- Foreign relations of imperial China
- History of Sino-Russian relations
- Sino–Russian border conflicts
