= List of major power stations in Heilongjiang =

This article lists the major power stations located in Heilongjiang province.

== Non-renewable ==
=== Coal-based ===
Station	Name in Chinese	Coordinates	Capacity (MW)	Operational units	Under construction units
Guoneng Harbin Thermal Power Station	国家能源哈尔滨热电厂	45°32′40″N 126°39′36″E	2,020	2×350 MW	2×660 MW
Qitaihe Power Station	七台河电厂	45°45′33″N 131°03′13″E	1,900	2×350 MW, 2×600 MW	
Harbin No3 Power Station	哈尔滨第三电厂	45°57′56″N 126°39′48″E	1,600	2×200 MW, 2×600 MW	1×660 MW
Fulaerji Power Station	富拉尔基发电厂	47°11′22″N 123°36′19″E 47°09′53″N 123°35′01″E	1,550	1×350 MW, 6×200 MW	
Jixi Power Station	鸡西电厂		1320		2×660 MW
Shuangyashan Power Station	双鸭山电厂	46°33′48″N 131°40′04″E	1,200	2×600 MW	
Hegang Power Station	鹤岗电厂	47°05′45″N 130°18′03″E	1,200	2×300 MW, 1×600 MW	
Baoqing Power Station	宝清电厂	46°15′06″N 132°32′47″E	1,200	2×600 MW	
Harbin Thermal Power Station	哈尔滨热电厂	45°42′36″N 126°41′43″E	950	2×300 MW, 1×350 MW	
Daqing Power Station	大庆电厂	46°42′15″N 124°50′54″E	700	2×350 MW	
Yichun Power Station	伊春电厂	47°44′18″N 128°45′16″E	700	2×350 MW	
Suihua Thermal Power Station	大唐绥化热电	46°39′29″N 127°02′07″E	700	2×350 MW	
Harbin No1 Thermal Power Station	哈尔滨第一热电厂	45°42′40″N 126°27′56″E	600	2×300 MW	
Mudanjiang No2 Power Station	牡丹江第二电厂	44°39′19″N 129°38′59″E	600	2×300 MW	
Jiamusi Power Station	佳木斯电厂	46°49′56″N 130°24′12″E	600	2×300 MW	
Qiqihar Thermal Power Station	齐齐哈尔热电厂	47°22′42″N 124°03′07″E	600	2×300 MW	
Xinhua Power Station	新华电厂	46°8′6″N 124°36′5″E	530	1×200 MW, 1×330 MW	
Shuangyashan Datang Thermal Power Station	大唐双鸭山热电厂	46°40′45″N 131°10′08″E	400	2×200 MW	

== Renewable ==
=== Hydroelectric ===
==== Conventional ====
Station	Name in Chinese	Coordinates	River	Capacity (MW)	Dam height (meters)	Status	Operational units	Under construction units	Planned units
Nierji Hydropower Station	尼尔基水利枢纽	48°29′36″N 124°31′53″E	Neng River	250	40.55	Operational	4×62.5 MW		
Lianhua Hydropower Station	莲花水电站	45°25′38″N 129°47′42″E	Mudan River	550	71.8	Operational	4×137.5 MW		

==== Pumped-storage ====
Station	Name in Chinese	Coordinates	Status	Capacity (MW)	Rated head (meters)	Operational units	Under construction units
Huanggou Pumped Storage Power Station	荒沟抽水蓄能电站	45°22′42″N 129°37′44″E	Operational	1,200	410	4×300 MW	
Shangzhi Pumped Storage Power Station	尚志抽水蓄能电站		UC	1,200	240		4×300 MW

== See also ==
- List of power stations in China
