= Xi'an District, Mudanjiang =

Xi'an District 西安区
- District
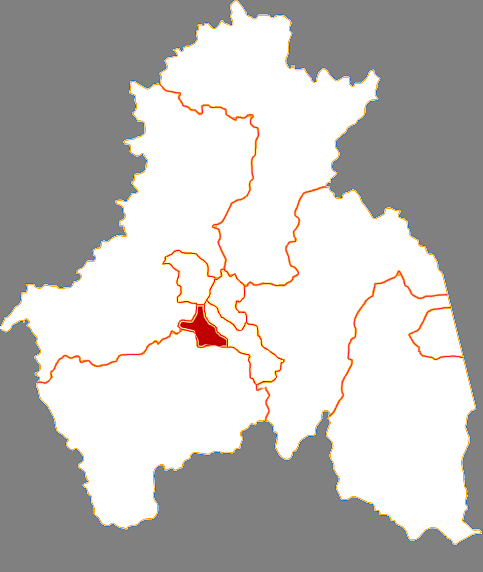
- Location of Xi'an District in Mudanjiang

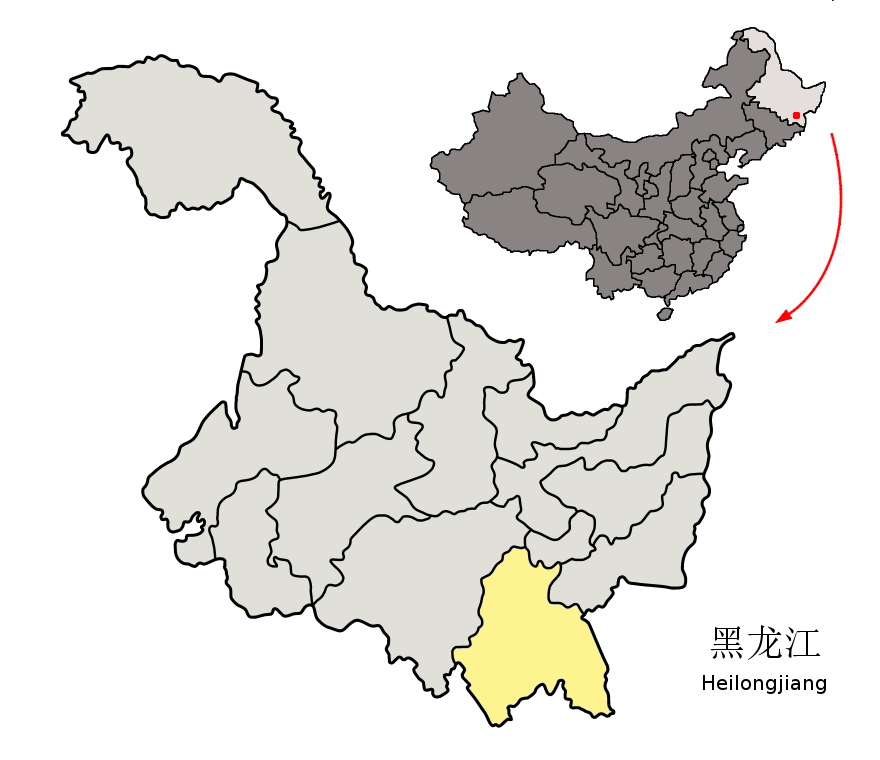
- Mudanjiang in Heilongjiang
- Coordinates: 44°34′39″N 129°36′58″E
- Country: People's Republic of China
- Province: Heilongjiang
- Prefecture-level city: Mudanjiang
- District seat: No.58, West Chang'an Street (西长安街58号)

Area
  - Total: 445 km^{2} (172 sq mi)

Population (2017)
  - Total: 249,000
  - Density: 560/km^{2} (1,450/sq mi)
- Time zone: UTC+8 (China Standard)
- Postal code: 157000
- Website: mdjxa.gov.cn

Xi'an District (Chinese: 西安区; pinyin: Xī'ān Qū) is a district of the city of Mudanjiang, Heilongjiang Province, China. Spanning an area of 445 square kilometres (172 mi^{2}), the district makes up the southwest portion of Mudanjiang's urban area. Xi'an District is notable for its large Korean community, and is home to more than 24,000 Koreans.

== Geography ==
Xi'an District is located in the southwest of Mudanjiang's urban area, bound by Taiping Road (Chinese: 太平路) in Dong'an District to the east, the county-level city of Ning'an to the south, the county-level city of Hailin to the west, and the Harbin–Suifenhe railway in Aimin District to the north.

The Hailang River flows through the district. Other major natural features in the district include Baoshan Lake (Chinese: 宝山湖), Heilong Mountain (Chinese: 黑龙山), and Jiangxin Island (Chinese: 江心岛).

== Administrative divisions ==
Xi'an District administers six subdistricts, one town, and one ethnic township.

=== Subdistricts ===
The district's six subdistricts are Xianfeng Subdistrict (先锋街道; 'Pioneer Subdistrict'), Huoju Subdistrict (火炬街道; 'Torch Subdistrict'), Lixin Subdistrict (立新街道), Mudan Subdistrict (牡丹街道; 'Peony Subdistrict'), Jiangbin Subdistrict (江滨街道), and Yanjiang Subdistrict (沿江街道).

=== Towns ===
The district's sole town is Wenchun (温春镇).

=== Ethnic townships ===
The district's sole township is Hainan Korean Ethnic Township (海南朝鲜族乡).

== Demographics ==
The district has a population of approximately 249,000 people.

Xi'an District's population comprises 16 different ethnic minorities, and is home to a sizable Korean population, numbering around 24,500. About 12,000 Koreans live along the Korean Folk Culture Street (Chinese: 朝鲜民俗风情街; pinyin: Cháoxiǎn Mínsú Fēngqíng Jiē) neighborhood of the district.

== Economy ==
Taiping Road (Chinese: 太平路), which forms the eastern border of Xi'an District, is a major commercial center in Mudanjiang, hosting a number of major retail outlets, such as a Dashang Xinmate (Chinese: 大商新玛特), Tiantian Department Store (Chinese: 甜甜百货), and Guanghui Home Appliances (Chinese: 广汇家电).

Approximately 180 industrial enterprises are located in Xi'an District, many of which are located in the Hainan SME Park (Chinese: 海南中小企业园区) and the Wenchun Pharmaceutical Park (Chinese: 温春药业园区), two major industrial parks in the district. Major industrial companies in the district include the Beichun Group (Chinese: 北纯集团), Futong Air Conditioning (Chinese: 富通空调), and Xinxiang Petroleum (Chinese: 新翔石油).

Agriculture is also practiced throughout the district, which grows 7,580 hectares (18,700 acres) of corn, 2,733 hectares (6,750 acres) of rice, and 1,220 hectares (3,000 acres) of other crops.

== Culture ==
The district is home to the Korean Folk Culture Street (Chinese: 朝鲜民俗风情街; pinyin: Cháoxiǎn Mínsú Fēngqíng Jiē), a neighborhood predominantly along West Chang'an Street (Chinese: 西长安街; pinyin: Xī Cháng'ān Jiē), bordered by West Shiyitiao Road (Chinese: 西十一条路; pinyin: Xī Shíyītiáo Lù) to the west, and by West Santiao Road (Chinese: 西三条路; pinyin: Xī Sāntiáo Lù) to the east. The Korean Folk Culture Street is approximately 1.9 kilometres (1.2 mi) long, and covers an area of 100,000 square metres (120,000 sq yd). The neighborhood, which the People's Daily reports as having more than 400 Korean businesses, has Korean-run offices, Korean schools, Korean museums, and a number of Korean cultural groups. The district's government has promoted the use of Chinese-Korean bilingual signs in the area, and has installed Korean-inspired art pieces and decorations throughout the neighborhood.

In addition, the Zhongshan Korean Folk Culture Park (Chinese: 中兴韩国民俗风情园).
