= Huanggou Pumped Storage Power Station =

- Interactive map of Huanggou Pumped Storage Power Station
- Country: China
- Location: Hailin County, Mudanjiang, Heilongjiang Province
- Coordinates: 45°20′35.09″N 129°42′4.17″E
- Status: Completed
- Construction began: 2014
- Opening date: 29th June 2022
- Operator: State Grid Corporation of China

Upper reservoir
- Creates: Huanggou Upper
- Total capacity: 11,610,000 m^{3} (9,410 acre⋅ft)

Lower reservoir
- Creates: Lianhua Reservoir
- Total capacity: 4,180,000,000 m^{3} (3,390,000 acre⋅ft)

Power Station
- Hydraulic head: 434.5 m (1,426 ft)
- Turbines: 4 x 300 MW Francis pump turbines
- Installed capacity: 1,200 MW
- Annual generation: 1.2 TWh (est.)

The Huanggou Pumped Storage Power Station is a 1,200 MW pumped-storage hydroelectric power station currently under construction about 90 km (56 mi) north of Mudanjiang in Hailin County of Heilongjiang Province, China. Construction on the project began on 8 May 2014. The first generator is scheduled to be commissioned in January 2019 and the project complete in January 2020. The station began full operation on 29 June 2022. The power station operates by shifting water between an upper and lower reservoir to generate electricity. The lower reservoir, Lianhua Reservoir, is located on the Mudan River and the upper reservoir is located in a valley above the north side of the lower reservoir. During periods of low energy demand, such as at night, water is pumped from Huanggou Lower Reservoir up to the upper reservoir. When energy demand is high, the water is released back down to the lower reservoir but the pump turbines that pumped the water up now reverse mode and serve as generators to produce electricity. The process is repeated as necessary and the plant serves as a peaking power plant. It is operated by the State Grid Corporation of China.

The lower Lianhua Reservoir is created by the 71.8 m (236 ft) tall and 902 m (2,959 ft) long Lianhua Dam, a rock-fill dam on the Mudan River. It can withhold up to 4,180,000,000 m^{3} (3,390,000 acre⋅ft) of water. The upper reservoir is created by an 80 m (260 ft) tall and 744.2 m (2,442 ft) long concrete-face rock-fill dam. It can withhold up to 11,610,000 m^{3} (9,410 acre⋅ft) of water, of which 10,280,000 m^{3} (8,330 acre⋅ft) can be used for power production. Water from the upper reservoir is sent to the underground power station down near the lower reservoir through headrace/penstock pipes. The power station contains four 300 MW Francis pump turbines. The difference in elevation between the upper and lower reservoir affords a hydraulic head (water drop) of 434.5 m (1,426 ft).

== See also ==
- List of pumped-storage power stations
