= Hualin =

Hualin could refer to the following locations in China:

- Hualin Township (桦林乡), Wushan County, Gansu
- Hualin Road Subdistrict (化林路街道), Fuxing District, Handan, Hebei
- Hualin, Heilongjiang (桦林镇), town in Yangming District, Mudanjiang
- Hualin, Jiangxi (华林镇), town in Xingzi County
- Hualin Temple (disambiguation)
