= Hailang River =

Tributary of the Mudan river

Coordinates: 44°32′50″N 129°32′46″E

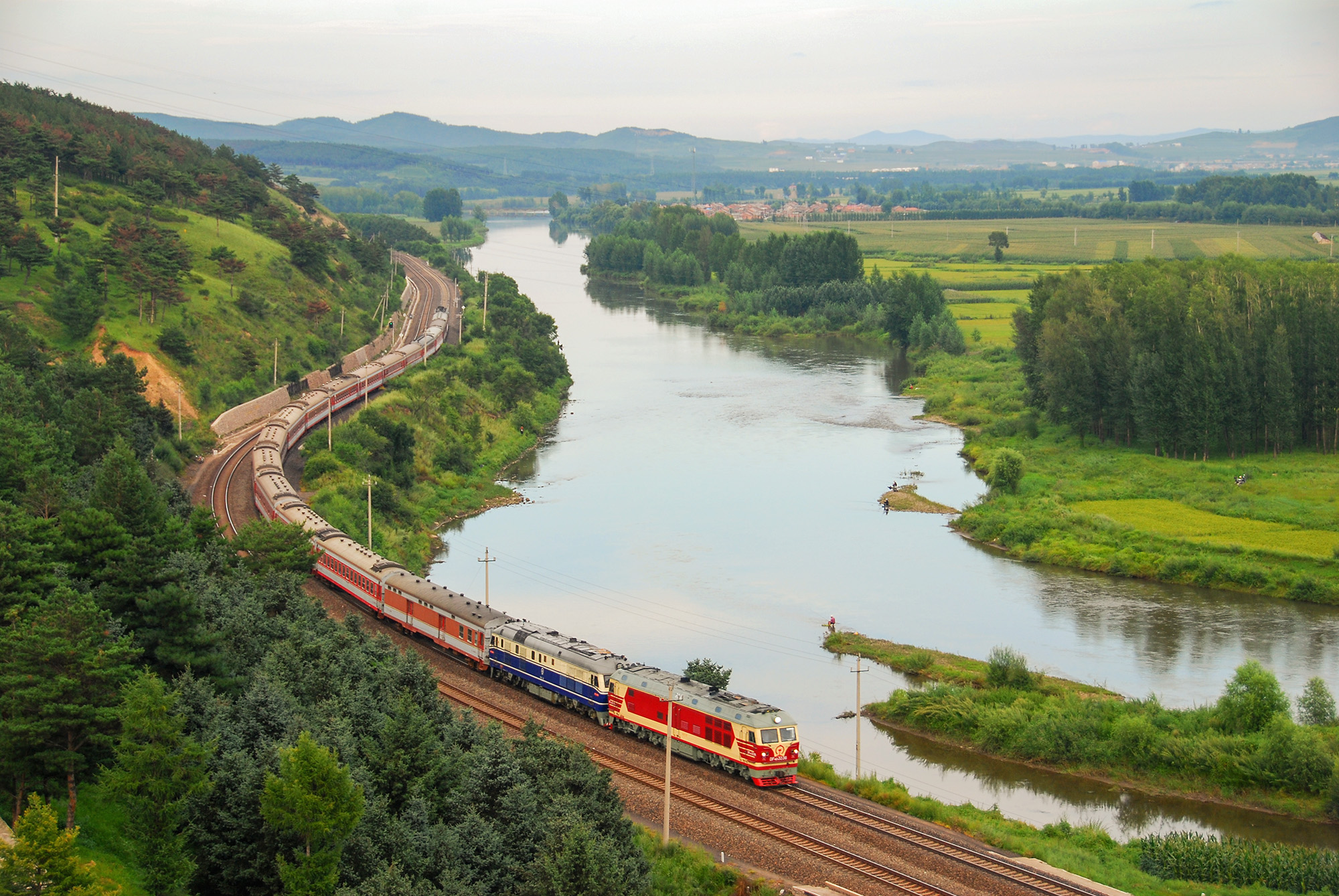
Hailang River near Hailin City in Heilongjiang.

The Hailang River (Chinese: 海浪河; pinyin: Hǎilàng Hé) is a left-bank tributary of the Mudan River in Northeast China. It starts from Haiyuan Tree Farm, Dunhua, Jilin Province, runs 222.3 kilometres through Hailin City and empties into the Mudan River at southwestern Mudanjiang City. The lower course of the Hailang River is fertile soil and ample products in Hailin City.
