= Hualin, Heilongjiang =

Hualin 桦林镇
- Town
- Location within Heilongjiang Location within China
- Coordinates: 44°41′13″N 129°41′16″E
- Country: China
- Province: Heilongjiang
- Prefecture-level city: Mudanjiang
- District: Yangming District
- Elevation: 230 m (750 ft)
- Time zone: UTC+8 (China Standard)
- Postal code: 157013

Hualin (simplified Chinese: 桦林; traditional Chinese: 樺林; pinyin: Huàlín) is a town in southern Heilongjiang, People's Republic of China, bounded to the northwest by the Mudan River and to the east by Linkou County. It is under the administration of Yangming District located 12 kilometres (7.5 mi) north-northeast of downtown Mudanjiang.
