= Mudanjiang (disambiguation) =

Mudanjiang is a prefecture-level city in Heilongjiang province, China.

Mudanjiang may also refer to:

- Mudan River, a river in Heilongjiang, China
- Songjiang Province, or Mudanjiang province, China
