= Hainan Korean Ethnic Township =

Hainan Korean Ethnic Township 海南朝鲜族乡 해남조선족향
- Ethnic township
- Location in Heilongjiang Hainan Korean Ethnic Township (China)
- Coordinates: 44.56369°N 129.49078°E
- Country: China
- Province: Heilongjiang
- Prefecture-level city: Mudanjiang
- District: Xi'an
- Time zone: UTC+8 (China Standard)

Hainan Korean Ethnic Township (simplified Chinese: 海南朝鲜族乡; traditional Chinese: 海南朝鮮族鄉; pinyin: Hǎinán Cháoxiǎnzú Xiāng; Korean: 해남조선족향) is a Korean ethnic township under the administration of Xi'an District, Mudanjiang, in Heilongjiang, China. As of 2018, it has 11 villages and one forest area under its administration.
