= Lianhua Dam =

Dam in Heilongjiang Province, China

- Location within China
- Country: China
- Location: Linkou County of Heilongjiang Province
- Coordinates: 45°25′38.52″N 129°47′42.53″E
- Purpose: Power, flood control, irrigation
- Status: Operational
- Construction began: 1992
- Opening date: 1996; 30 years ago

Dam and spillways
- Type of dam: Embankment, concrete-face rock-fill
- Impounds: Mudan River
- Height: 71.8 m (236 ft)
- Length: 902 m (2,959 ft)
- Width (crest): 8 m (26 ft)
- Dam volume: 3,900,000 m^{3} (5,100,000 cu yd)
- Spillway type: Controlled chute
- Spillway capacity: 18,570 m^{3}/s (656,000 cu ft/s)

Reservoir
- Creates: Lianhua Reservoir
- Total capacity: 4,180,000,000 m^{3} (3,390,000 acre⋅ft)
- Catchment area: 30,200 km^{2} (11,700 mi^{2})
- Normal elevation: 218 m (715 ft)

Lianhua Hydropower Plant
- Operator: Mudanjiang General Hydropower Plant
- Commission date: 1996-1998
- Type: Conventional
- Turbines: 4 x 137.5 MW Francis-type
- Installed capacity: 550 MW

The Lianhua Dam is a concrete-face rock-fill dam on the Mudan River in Linkou County of Heilongjiang Province, China. It is located about 95 km (59 mi) north of Mudanjiang. The 71.8 m (236 ft) tall dam serves several purposes to include hydroelectric power generation, flood control and water supply for irrigation. The dam withholds a large 4,180,000,000 m^{3} (3,390,000 acre⋅ft) capacity reservoir and supports a 550 MW power station. Construction on the dam began in November 1992 and its first 137.5 MW Francis turbine-generator was operational in December 1996. Two more generators were commissioned on 12 December 1997 and the remaining generator was commissioned on 28 September 1998. It is the first large modern water conservancy project in Heilongjiang. The dam's reservoir displaced 40,000 people and will serve as the lower reservoir for the Huanggou Pumped Storage Power Station when it is complete.

== See also ==
- List of dams and reservoirs in China
