= Xiangyang Subdistrict, Mudanjiang =

Xiangyang Subdistrict 向阳街道
- Subdistrict
- Location in Heilongjiang Xiangyang Subdistrict (China)
- Coordinates: 44°35′41″N 129°35′1″E
- Country: People's Republic of China
- Province: Heilongjiang
- Prefecture-level city: Mudanjiang
- District: Aimin District
- Time zone: UTC+8 (China Standard)

Xiangyang Subdistrict (Chinese: 向阳街道; pinyin: Xiàngyáng Jiēdào) is a subdistrict in Aimin District, Mudanjiang, Heilongjiang, China. As of 2018, it has 3 residential communities under its administration.

== See also ==
- List of township-level divisions of Heilongjiang
