= Yangming District =

Coordinates: 44°35′46″N 129°38′08″E

Yangming District 阳明区
- District
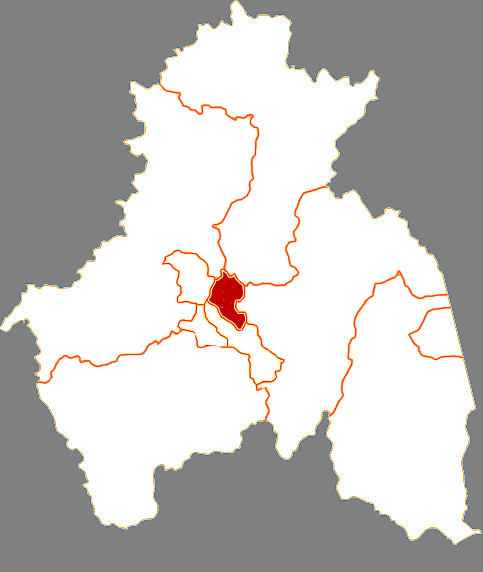
- Location of Yangming District in Mudanjiang

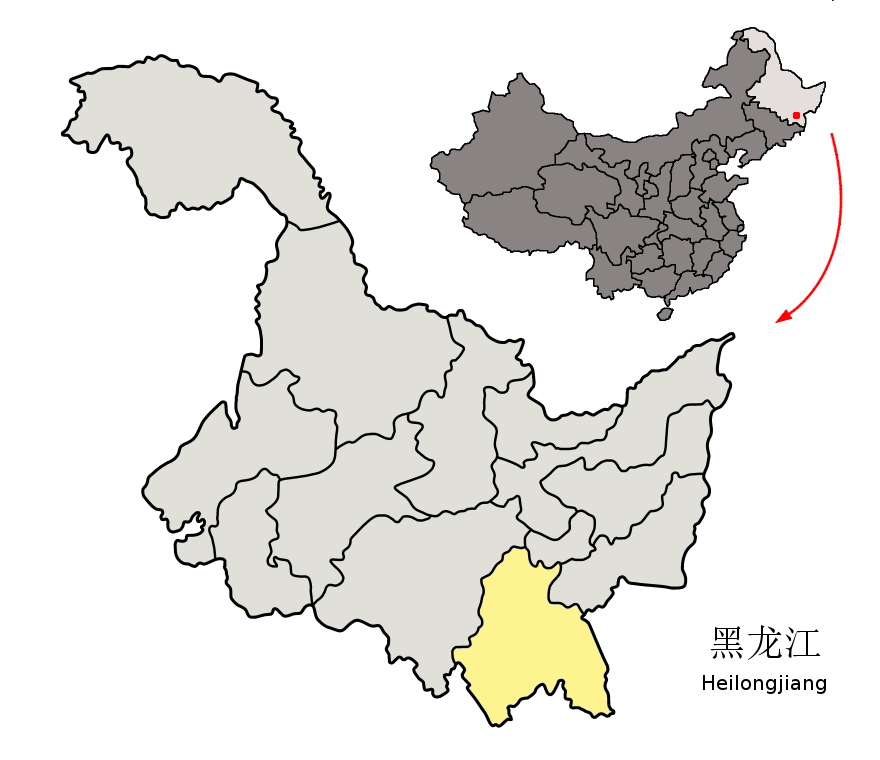
- Mudanjiang in Heilongjiang
- Country: People's Republic of China
- Province: Heilongjiang
- Prefecture-level city: Mudanjiang
- District seat: No.68, Guanghua Street (光华街68号)

Area
  - Total: 1,345 km^{2} (519 sq mi)

Population (2017)
  - Total: 253,000
  - Density: 188/km^{2} (487/sq mi)
- Time zone: UTC+8 (China Standard)
- Postal code: 157000
- Website: yangming.gov.cn

Yangming District (simplified Chinese: 阳明区; traditional Chinese: 陽明區; pinyin: Yángmíng Qū) is a district of the prefecture-level city of Mudanjiang, Heilongjiang province, China.

== Administrative divisions ==
Yangming District is divided into 4 subdistricts and 4 townships.

3 subdistricts

- Yangming (阳明街道), Qianjin (前进街道), Xinxing (新兴街道) and Hualinxiangjiaochang (桦林橡胶厂街道)

4 towns

- Tieling (铁岭镇), Hualin (桦林镇), Modaoshi (磨刀石镇) and Wulin (五林镇)
