= Hualin Temple =

Hualin Temple (simplified Chinese: 华林寺; traditional Chinese: 華林寺; pinyin: Huálín Sì), may refer to:

- Hualin Temple (Guangzhou), in Guangzhou, Guangdong, China
- Hualin Temple (Fuzhou), in Fuzhou, Fujian, China
