= Aimin District =

Aimin District 爱民区
- District
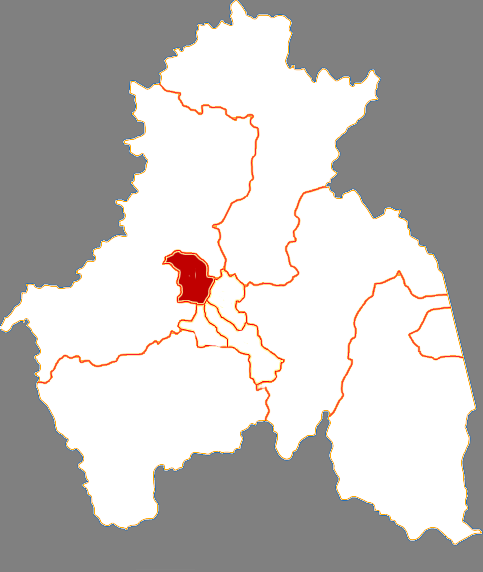
- Location of Aimin District in Mudanjiang

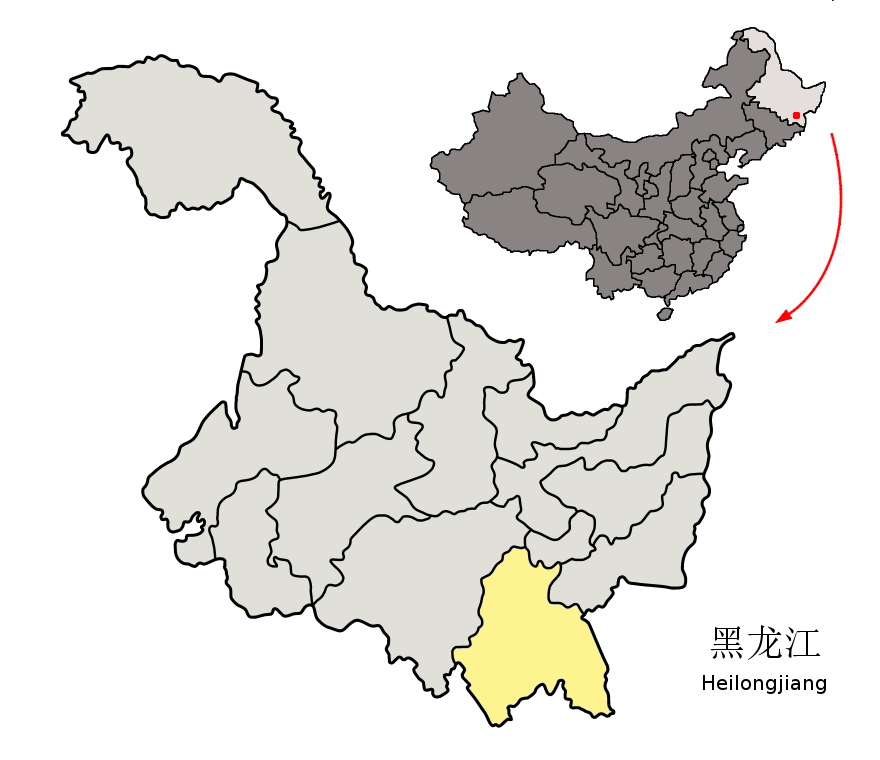
- Mudanjiang in Heilongjiang
- Coordinates: 44°35′48″N 129°35′27″E
- Country: China
- Province: Heilongjiang
- Prefecture-level city: Mudanjiang
- Township-level divisions: 7 subdistricts 1 town
- District seat: Xiangyang Subdistrict

Area
  - Total: 389 km^{2} (150 sq mi)
- Elevation: 244 m (801 ft)

Population (2020 census)
  - Total: 275,436
  - Density: 708/km^{2} (1,830/sq mi)
- Time zone: UTC+8 (China Standard)
- Postal code: 157009
- Website: www.aimin.gov.cn

Aimin District (simplified Chinese: 爱民区; traditional Chinese: 愛民區; pinyin: Àimín Qū) is a district of Mudanjiang, Heilongjiang, China.

== Administrative divisions ==
Aimin is divided into seven subdistricts and one town:

7 Subdistricts are: Xiangyang Subdistrict (向阳街道), Huanghua Subdistrict (黄花街道), Tiebei Subdistrict (铁北街道), Xinhua Subdistrict (新华街道), Daqing Subdistrict (大庆街道), Xingping Subdistrict (兴平街道), Beishan Subdistrict (北山街道).

The only town is Sandaoguan Town (三道关镇).
