= Linkou County =

Linkou County 林口县
- County
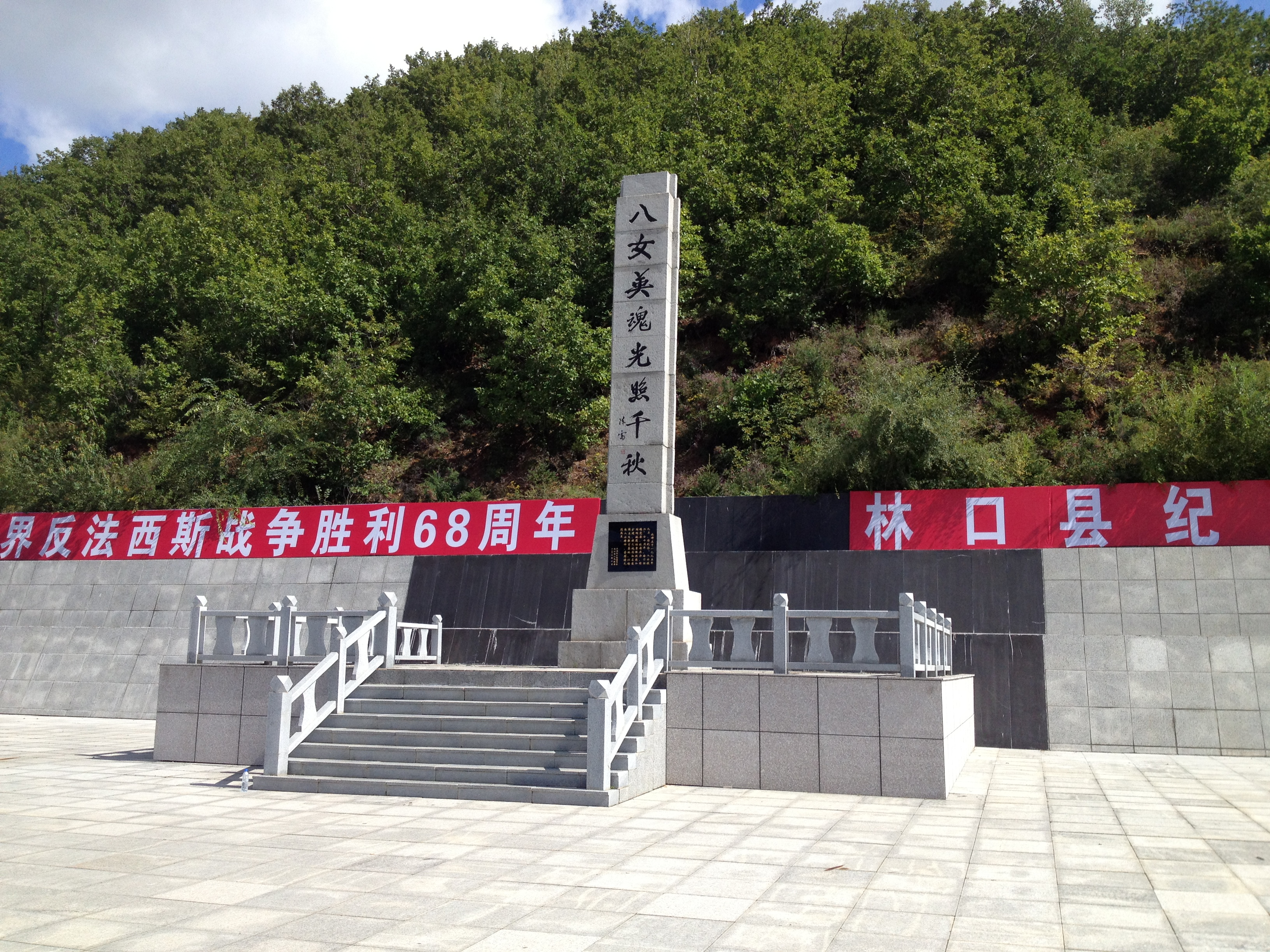

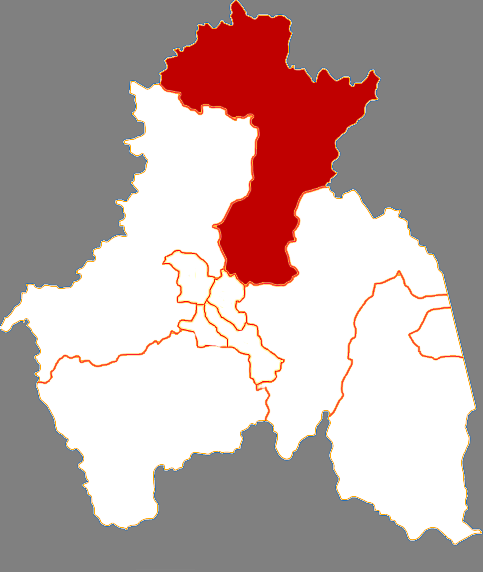
- Linkou in Mudanjiang

- Location of the seat in Heilongjiang
- Coordinates: 45°21′N 130°08′E
- Country: People's Republic of China
- Province: Heilongjiang
- Prefecture-level city: Mudanjiang

Area
  - Total: 7,191 km^{2} (2,776 sq mi)

Population (2020)
  - Total: 238,193
  - Density: 33.12/km^{2} (85.79/sq mi)
- Time zone: UTC+8 (China Standard)
- Website: www.linkou.gov.cn

Linkou County (Chinese: 林口县; pinyin: Línkǒu Xiàn) is a county in the southeast of Heilongjiang Province, China. It is under the jurisdiction of the prefecture-level city of Mudanjiang.

== Administrative divisions ==
Linkou County is divided into 11 towns.

11 towns

- Linkou (林口镇), Gucheng (古城镇), Diaoling (刁翎镇), Zhujia (朱家镇), Liushu (柳树镇), Sandaotong (三道通镇), Longzhua (龙爪镇), Lianhua (莲花镇), Qingshan (青山镇), Jiantang (建堂镇) and Kuishan (奎山镇)

== Demographics ==
The population of the district was 238,193 in 2020.

== Climate ==
Climate data for Linkou, elevation 275 m (902 ft), (1991–2020 normals, extremes 1981–2010)
Month	Jan	Feb	Mar	Apr	May	Jun	Jul	Aug	Sep	Oct	Nov	Dec	Year
Record high °C (°F)	4.7 (40.5)	9.5 (49.1)	18.6 (65.5)	29.6 (85.3)	32.6 (90.7)	37.8 (100.0)	37.7 (99.9)	35.8 (96.4)	31.5 (88.7)	26.7 (80.1)	16.8 (62.2)	8.2 (46.8)	37.8 (100.0)
Mean daily maximum °C (°F)	−10.2 (13.6)	−5.1 (22.8)	2.6 (36.7)	12.9 (55.2)	20.4 (68.7)	25.2 (77.4)	27.6 (81.7)	26.1 (79.0)	21.2 (70.2)	12.4 (54.3)	0.5 (32.9)	−8.6 (16.5)	10.4 (50.7)
Daily mean °C (°F)	−17.6 (0.3)	−12.6 (9.3)	−3.7 (25.3)	6.1 (43.0)	13.6 (56.5)	19.1 (66.4)	22.0 (71.6)	20.3 (68.5)	14.0 (57.2)	5.5 (41.9)	−5.2 (22.6)	−14.9 (5.2)	3.9 (39.0)
Mean daily minimum °C (°F)	−23.4 (−10.1)	−19.2 (−2.6)	−9.8 (14.4)	−0.4 (31.3)	7.0 (44.6)	13.4 (56.1)	17.2 (63.0)	15.8 (60.4)	8.1 (46.6)	−0.3 (31.5)	−10.1 (13.8)	−19.9 (−3.8)	−1.8 (28.8)
Record low °C (°F)	−36.1 (−33.0)	−37.4 (−35.3)	−28.2 (−18.8)	−10.0 (14.0)	−4.9 (23.2)	1.6 (34.9)	9.9 (49.8)	6.2 (43.2)	−4.6 (23.7)	−15.6 (3.9)	−28.9 (−20.0)	−35.1 (−31.2)	−37.4 (−35.3)
Average precipitation mm (inches)	6.0 (0.24)	3.5 (0.14)	12.2 (0.48)	23.9 (0.94)	59.8 (2.35)	86.2 (3.39)	124.3 (4.89)	127.4 (5.02)	57.5 (2.26)	32.7 (1.29)	15.3 (0.60)	6.5 (0.26)	555.3 (21.86)
Average precipitation days (≥ 0.1 mm)	4.8	4.1	6.2	8.2	13.3	14.9	14.8	14.3	10.7	7.9	6.3	5.7	111.2
Average snowy days	7.1	6.2	8.7	4.4	0	0	0	0	0	2.5	7.7	8.7	45.3
Average relative humidity (%)	69	64	59	55	60	69	77	81	74	65	65	69	67
Mean monthly sunshine hours	170.3	194.5	230.9	229.9	242.7	245.6	235.2	221.7	229.4	202.8	164.4	153.5	2,520.9
Percentage possible sunshine	60	66	62	57	53	53	50	51	62	60	58	57	57
Source: China Meteorological Administration
