= Hailin =

Hailin 海林市
- County-level city
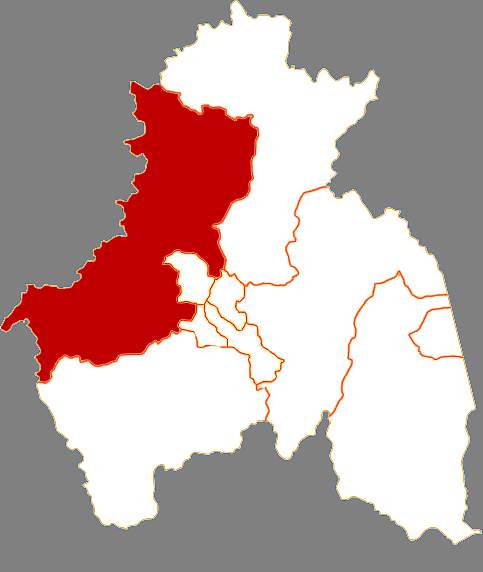
- Hailin in Mudanjiang

- Location of the city center in Heilongjiang
- Coordinates: 44°35′38″N 129°22′48″E
- Country: People's Republic of China
- Province: Heilongjiang
- Prefecture-level city: Mudanjiang

Area
  - Land: 9,877 km^{2} (3,814 sq mi)

Population (2003)
  - Total: 440,000
  - Density: 45/km^{2} (120/sq mi)
- Time zone: UTC+8 (China Standard)
- Postal code: 157100
- Area code: 0453
- Climate: Dwa
- Website: www.hailin.gov.cn

Hailin (Chinese: 海林; pinyin: Hǎilín) is a county-level city, under the administration of the prefecture-level city of Mudanjiang, in the southeast of Heilongjiang province, China, bordering Jilin province to the southwest. It has an area of 8,816 km^{2} (3,404 sq mi), and a population of 422,000 (as reported in 2012). Ethnic groups include the majority Han Chinese as well as significant numbers of Manchu and ethnic Koreans.

== Name and meaning ==
The name Hailin in English means "sea forest". Some people guess the meaning is "boundless forest", but the city was a merger of two counties, "Xinhai" and "Wulin", and its name was chosen by Chinese character in each of the old counties, and combined as"Hailin". In this sense, Hailin shares a name with the "boundless" Linhai Snowfield (林海雪原; Línhǎi Xuěyuán).

Hailin is today known by several descriptive names - "forest sea and snow plain", "hometown of Manchurian tigers", and "hometown of Chinese north medicine". However, in the past many knew Hailin from the story of people's revolutionary hero Yang Zi Rong (杨子荣), the real life hero Zhang Zonggui. His story was made into a modern, revolutionary Beijing opera Taking Tiger Mountain by Strategy, based the 1957 novel 林海雪原 (Línhǎi Xuěyuan) by Qü Bo. Various movies have been made of the same story.

== History ==
Hailin must have been inhabited even in the ancient times of the Shang dynasty, if not the Neolithic era. Historic sites include ancient Qunli rock paintings, Jiangdong ancient cemeteries of Jin dynasty, the early site of the Qing dynasty Ninguta city (from which a structure called Ninggu Ta - "Ninngu Tower" - remains), a wooden Russian Orthodox cathedral, a depot of the Chinese Eastern Railway constructed in 1903, and the Yang Zirong martyrs' cemetery.

During Second Sino-Japanese War, the Japanese established a military airport at Hailin. Even recently (2005) aircraft bombs continue to be discovered during construction and other projects.

The present day administrative division traces its recent history to Xinhai county established in 1946. The division was changed to city-grade in 1992.

== Administrative divisions ==
Nowadays, there are 8 towns and 123 administrative villages in Hailin City. The towns include:

- Hailin Town (海林镇), Zhangting Town (长汀镇), Chaihe Town (柴河镇), Sandao Town (三道镇), Erdao Town (二道镇), Hengdao Town (横道镇), Xin'an Korean Ethnic Town (新安朝鲜族镇) and Shanshi Town (山市镇)

== Geography and resources ==
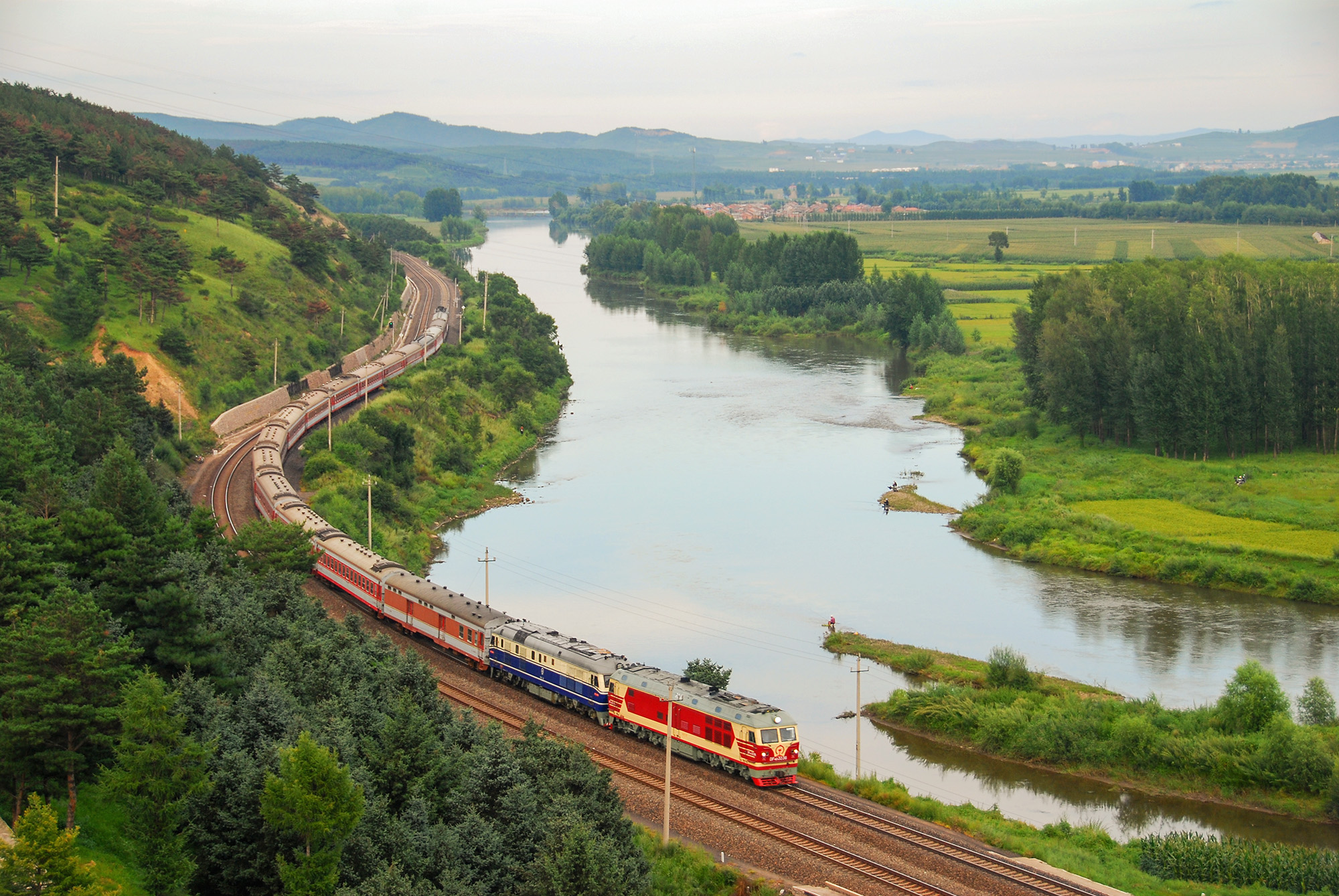
The K1452 Train on the Harbin-Suifenhe Railway along the Hailang River near Hailin.

90% of the Hailin City administrative area is mountainous. Principal geographic features of Hailin include Shen Mountain, Qian Mountain, Qiulingman Mound, Haigu Plain, Zhangguancai Ridge, and 140 streams or rivers of the Mudanjiang water system (74 belonging to the Hailang drainage basin and 66 belonging to the Mudanjiang drainage basin). The larger rivers are the Mudanjiang River, the Hailang River, Sandao River, Erdao River, Toudao River, Shanshi River, Mijang River, Hongdian River, and Douyin River.

71% of the county is covered by forest. Important products include timber, medicinal herbs such as ginseng and eleutherococcus senticosus, and forest foods such as edible mushrooms, which are farmed in large quantities.

== Climate ==
Climate data for Hailin, elevation 292 m (958 ft), (1991–2020 normals, extremes 1981–2010)
Month	Jan	Feb	Mar	Apr	May	Jun	Jul	Aug	Sep	Oct	Nov	Dec	Year
Record high °C (°F)	4.1 (39.4)	11.0 (51.8)	19.0 (66.2)	29.9 (85.8)	33.0 (91.4)	35.6 (96.1)	37.6 (99.7)	35.9 (96.6)	30.8 (87.4)	27.0 (80.6)	19.4 (66.9)	9.4 (48.9)	37.6 (99.7)
Mean daily maximum °C (°F)	−10.0 (14.0)	−5.2 (22.6)	3.2 (37.8)	13.3 (55.9)	20.8 (69.4)	25.6 (78.1)	27.8 (82.0)	26.6 (79.9)	21.5 (70.7)	13.0 (55.4)	0.7 (33.3)	−8.5 (16.7)	10.7 (51.3)
Daily mean °C (°F)	−17.1 (1.2)	−12.7 (9.1)	−3.3 (26.1)	6.1 (43.0)	13.7 (56.7)	19.0 (66.2)	21.9 (71.4)	20.7 (69.3)	14.2 (57.6)	5.3 (41.5)	−5.4 (22.3)	−14.8 (5.4)	4.0 (39.2)
Mean daily minimum °C (°F)	−22.8 (−9.0)	−19.4 (−2.9)	−10.0 (14.0)	−0.9 (30.4)	6.9 (44.4)	13.0 (55.4)	16.9 (62.4)	16.0 (60.8)	8.2 (46.8)	−1.0 (30.2)	−10.8 (12.6)	−19.9 (−3.8)	−2.0 (28.4)
Record low °C (°F)	−34.0 (−29.2)	−33.8 (−28.8)	−24.4 (−11.9)	−12.6 (9.3)	−3.6 (25.5)	4.9 (40.8)	9.3 (48.7)	7.5 (45.5)	−4.6 (23.7)	−14.7 (5.5)	−26.0 (−14.8)	−32.0 (−25.6)	−34.0 (−29.2)
Average precipitation mm (inches)	4.7 (0.19)	4.6 (0.18)	11.2 (0.44)	26.8 (1.06)	64.3 (2.53)	86.0 (3.39)	129.2 (5.09)	118 (4.6)	62.1 (2.44)	29.6 (1.17)	17.0 (0.67)	5.6 (0.22)	559.1 (21.98)
Average precipitation days (≥ 0.1 mm)	3.8	3.9	6.7	8.0	13.8	15.0	14.4	15.2	10.5	8.1	6.3	5.5	111.2
Average snowy days	6.8	6.2	9.0	3.9	0.1	0	0	0	0	2.6	7.8	8.4	44.8
Average relative humidity (%)	68	62	57	53	60	70	77	80	74	66	65	68	67
Mean monthly sunshine hours	152.0	179.1	216.9	216.3	237.5	234.8	225.5	203.4	217.6	198.8	156.8	140.7	2,379.4
Percentage possible sunshine	53	60	58	53	52	51	48	47	59	59	55	51	54
Source: China Meteorological Administration

== Tourism ==
Tourist activities include skiing. Other attractions include two national forest parks (Roaring Tiger Mountain and China Snowland), the largest artificial lake in northeast China (the Lotus Lake), and the largest animal raising center in China, if not the world (the Hengdaohezi Northeast Tiger Center). Hengdaohezi Northeast Tiger Park is the largest breeding center for Siberian tigers in the country. It was established in 1986 with 8 tigers, and has a population of some 256 tigers (as of 2006).
