= Mudan River =

River in Heilongjiang, China

Coordinates: 46°19′13″N 129°32′13″E

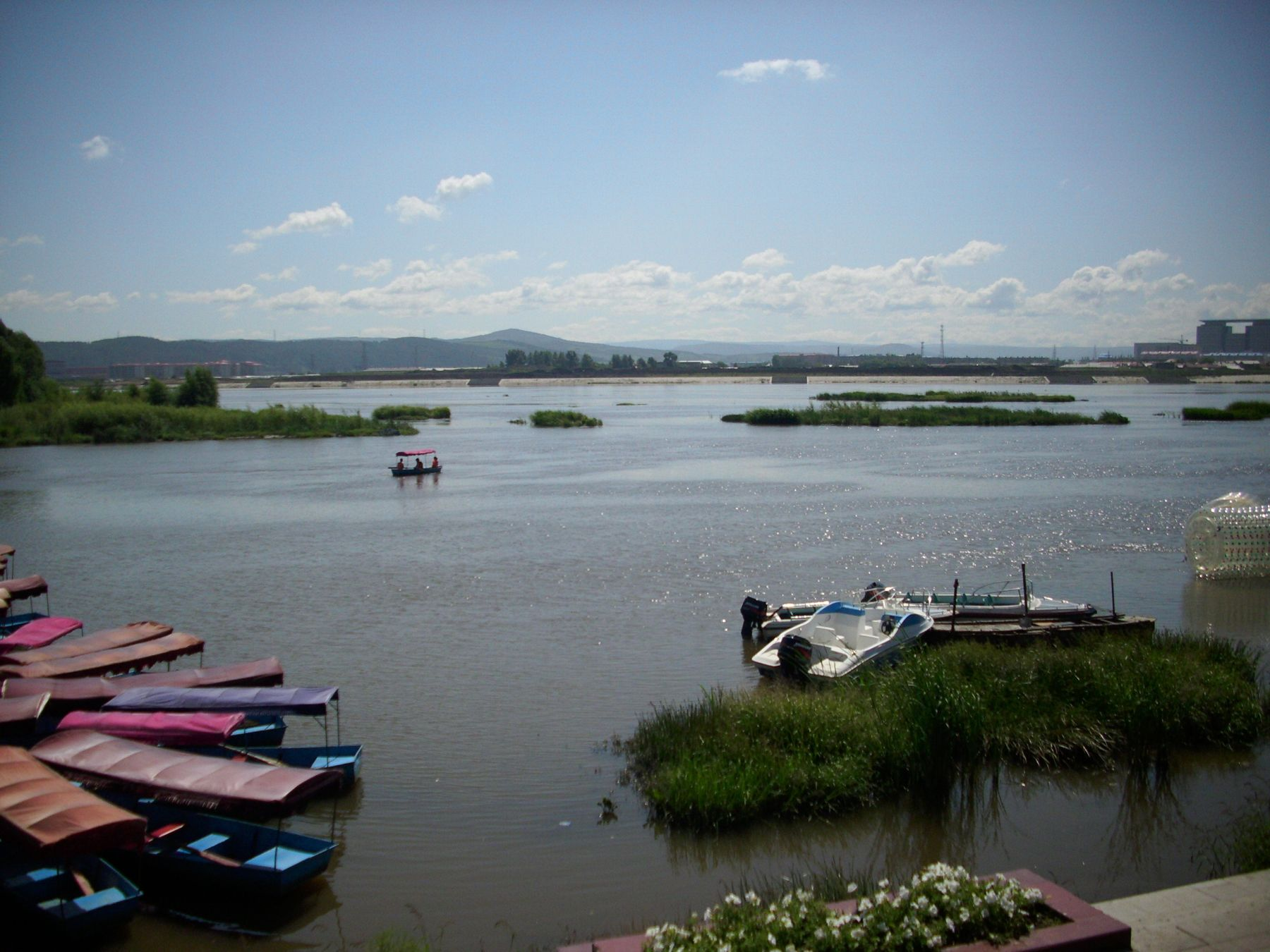
- Panoramic view on the Mudanjiang river

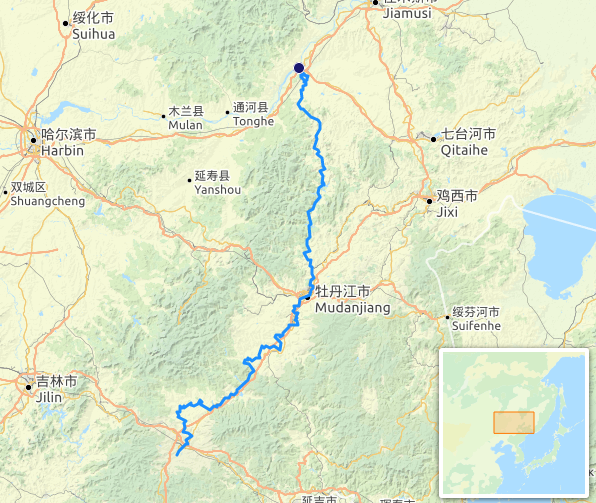
- Path of the Mudan
- Native name: ᠮᡠᡩᠠᠨ ᡠᠯᠠ (Manchu)

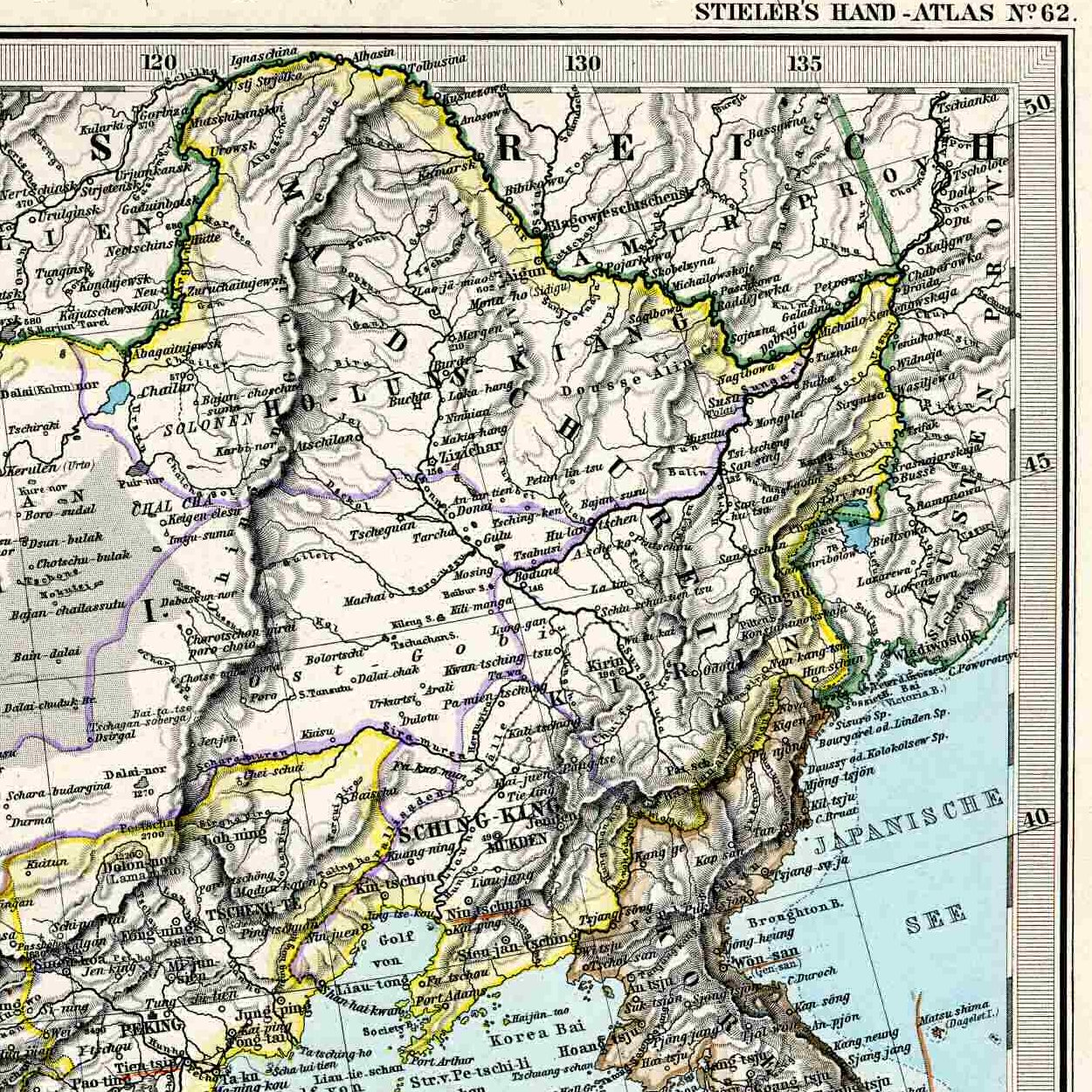
The Hurka River on a German 1891 map

The Mudan River (Chinese: 牡丹江; pinyin: Mǔdānjiāng; IPA: [mù.tán.tɕjáŋ]; Manchu: ᠮᡠᡩᠠᠨ
ᡠᠯᠠ, romanized: mudan ula) is a river in Heilongjiang province in China. It is a right tributary of the Sunggari River.

Its modern Chinese name can be translated as the "Peony River". In the past it was also known as the Hurka or Hurha River (Chinese: 瑚爾哈; pinyin: Hú'ěrhā; [xǔ.àɚ.xá]).

The river flows into Lake Jingpo, and then continues north, flowing by Ning'an and Mudanjiang City (which is named after the river), then into Lianhua Reservoir before falling into the Sungari River at Yilan (formerly known as Sanxing).
