= Mudanjiang =

Mudanjiang 牡丹江市 Mutankiang
- Prefecture-level city
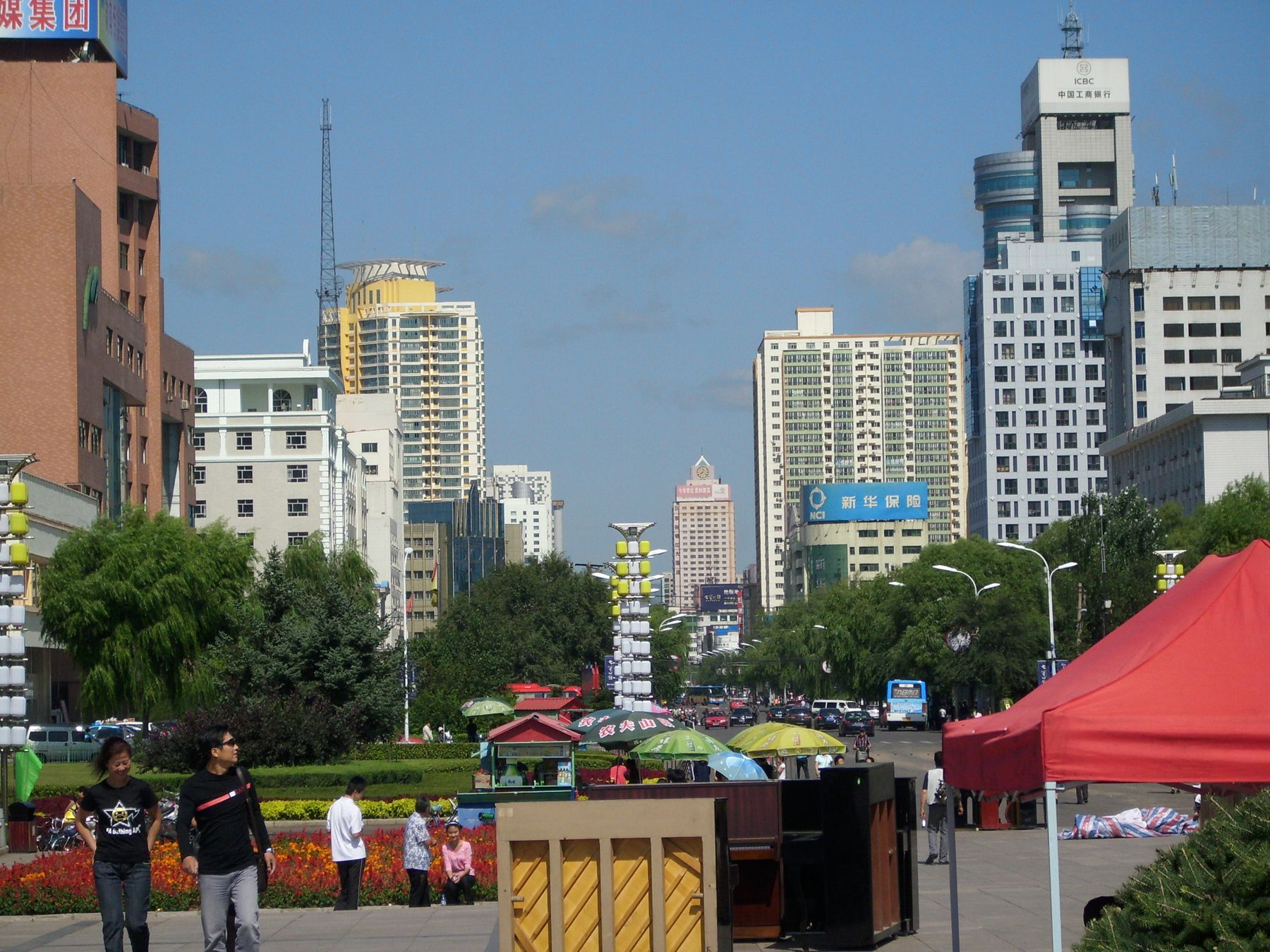
- Riverside Park Mudanjiang Railway Station street view Mudanjiang Grand Theater Beishan Park 11 Golden Horse Sculpture Ningan Mudan River

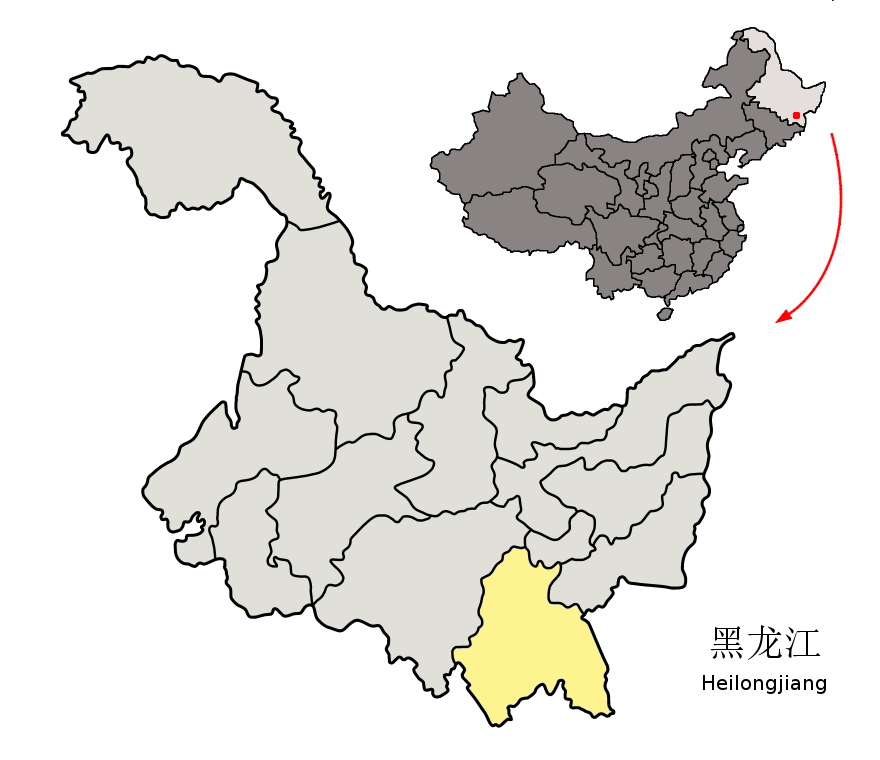
- Location of Mudanjiang City (yellow) in Heilongjiang (light gray)

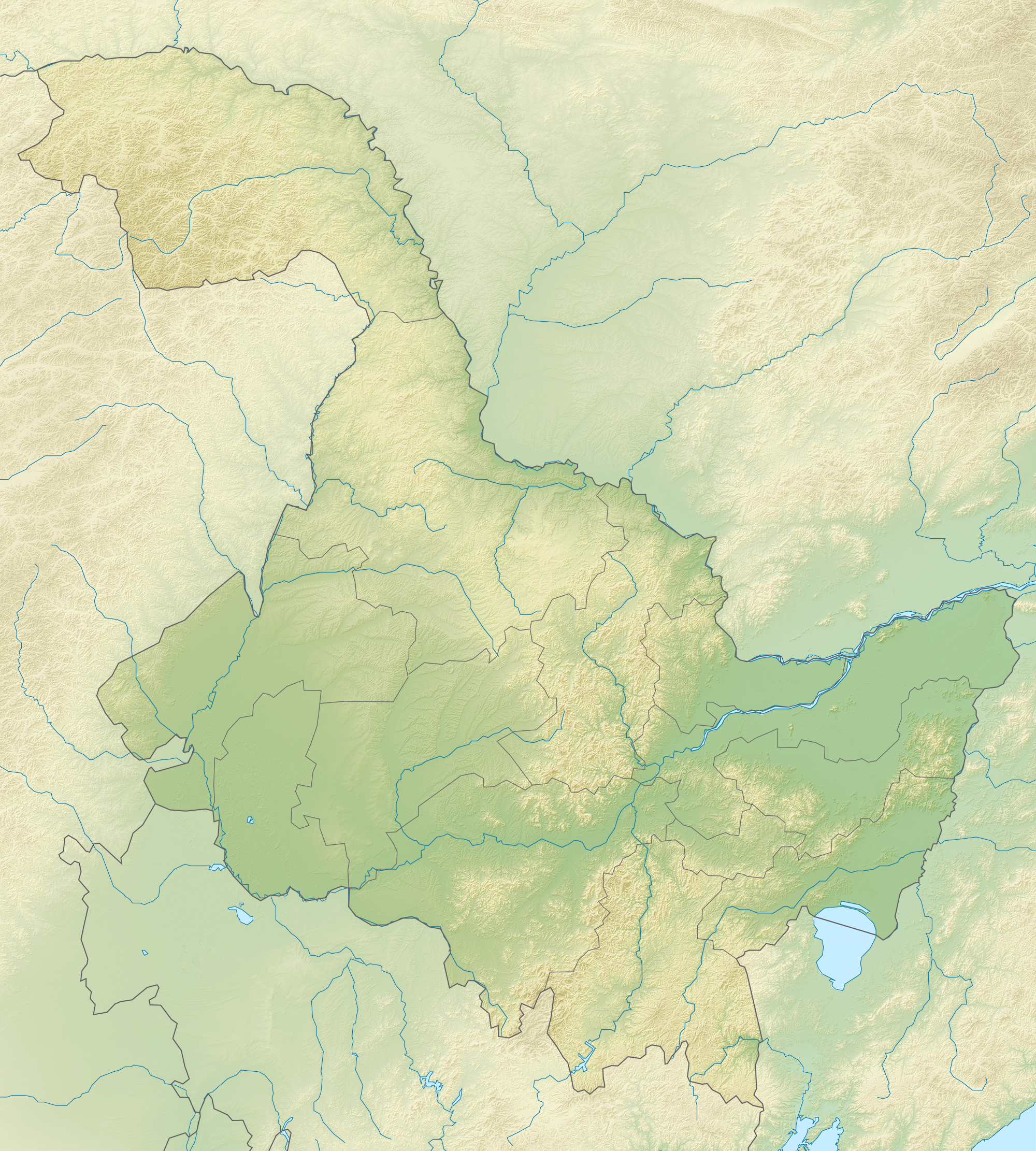
- Location of the city center in Heilongjiang Mudanjiang (China)
- Coordinates (Mudanjiang municipal government): 44°33′05″N 129°37′58″E
- Country: China
- Province: Heilongjiang
- County-level divisions: 10
- Named for: Mudan River
- Municipal seat: Dong'an District

Government
  - Type: Prefecture-level city
  - CPC Mudanjiang Secretary: Zhang Jingchuan (张晶川)
  - Mayor: Lin Kuanhai (林宽海)

Area
  - Prefecture-level city: 40,233 km^{2} (15,534 sq mi)
  - Urban: 2,495 km^{2} (963 sq mi)
  - Metro: 2,495 km^{2} (963 sq mi)
- Elevation: 233 m (764 ft)

Population (2020 census)
  - Prefecture-level city: 2,290,208
  - Density: 56.924/km^{2} (147.43/sq mi)
  - Urban: 930,015
  - Urban density: 372.8/km^{2} (965.4/sq mi)
  - Metro: 930,105
  - Metro density: 372.8/km^{2} (965.5/sq mi)

GDP
  - Prefecture-level city: CN¥ 131 billion US$ 21 billion
  - Per capita: CN¥ 49,876; US$ 8,008
- Time zone: UTC+8 (China Standard)
- Postal code: 157000
- Area code: 453
- ISO 3166 code: CN-HL-10
- Licence plates: 黑C
- Website: www.mudanjiang.gov.cn

Mudanjiang
- "Mudanjiang", as written in Chinese

Chinese name
- Chinese: 牡丹江
Transcriptions
Standard Mandarin
- Hanyu Pinyin: Mǔdānjiāng

Manchu name
- Manchu script: ᠮᡠᡩ᠋ᠠᠨ ᠪᡳᡵᠠ ᡥᠣᡨᠣᠨ
- Romanization: Mudan bira hoton

Russian name
- Russian: Муданьцзян

Mudanjiang (Chinese: 牡丹江; pinyin: Mǔdānjiāng; Manchu: Mudan bira; Russian: Муданьцзян), alternately romanized as Mutankiang, is a prefecture-level city in the southeast part of Heilongjiang province, People's Republic of China. It was called Botankou under Japanese occupation. It serves as a regional transport hub with a railway junction and an international airport connecting with several major Chinese cities as well as Incheon International Airport serving Seoul, South Korea. Mudanjiang is located 248 km (154 mi) from Vladivostok, Russia. In 2011, Mudanjiang had a GDP of RMB 93.48 billion with a 15.1% growth rate. In 2015, Mudanjiang had a GDP of RMB 118.63 billion.

As of the 2020 census Mudanjiang had a population of 2,290,208, of whom 930,051 lived in the 4 urban districts comprising the built-up area of the city. In 2007, the city was listed as one of China's top ten livable cities by Chinese Cities Brand Value Report, which was released at the 2007 Beijing Summit of China Cities Forum.

== History ==
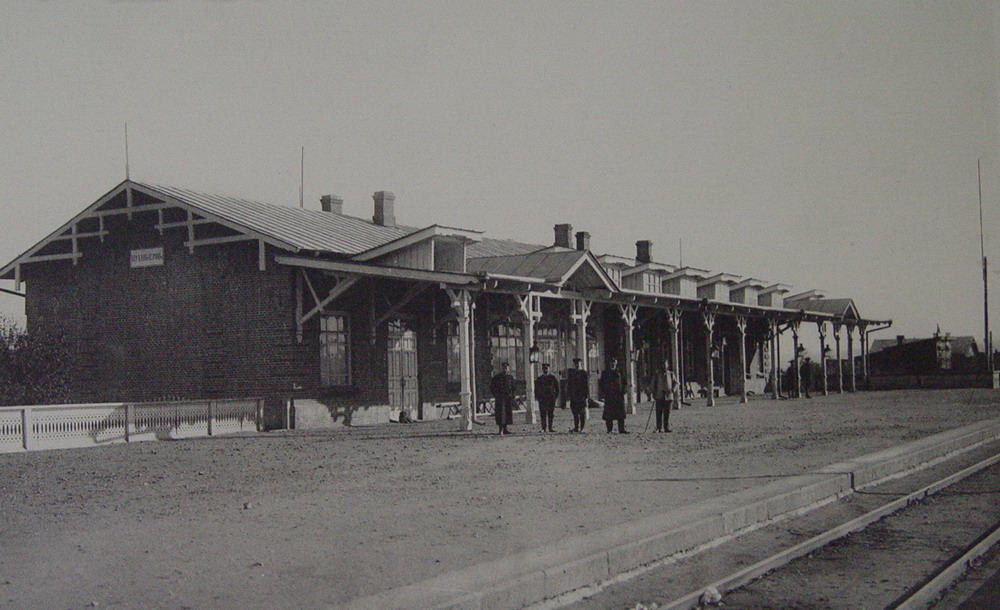
Mudanjiang Railway Station during the 1900s

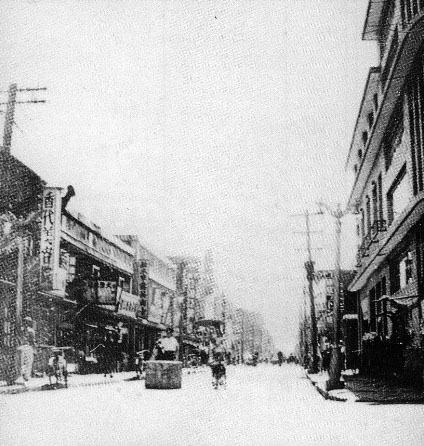
Ginza street of Mudanjiang, 1942

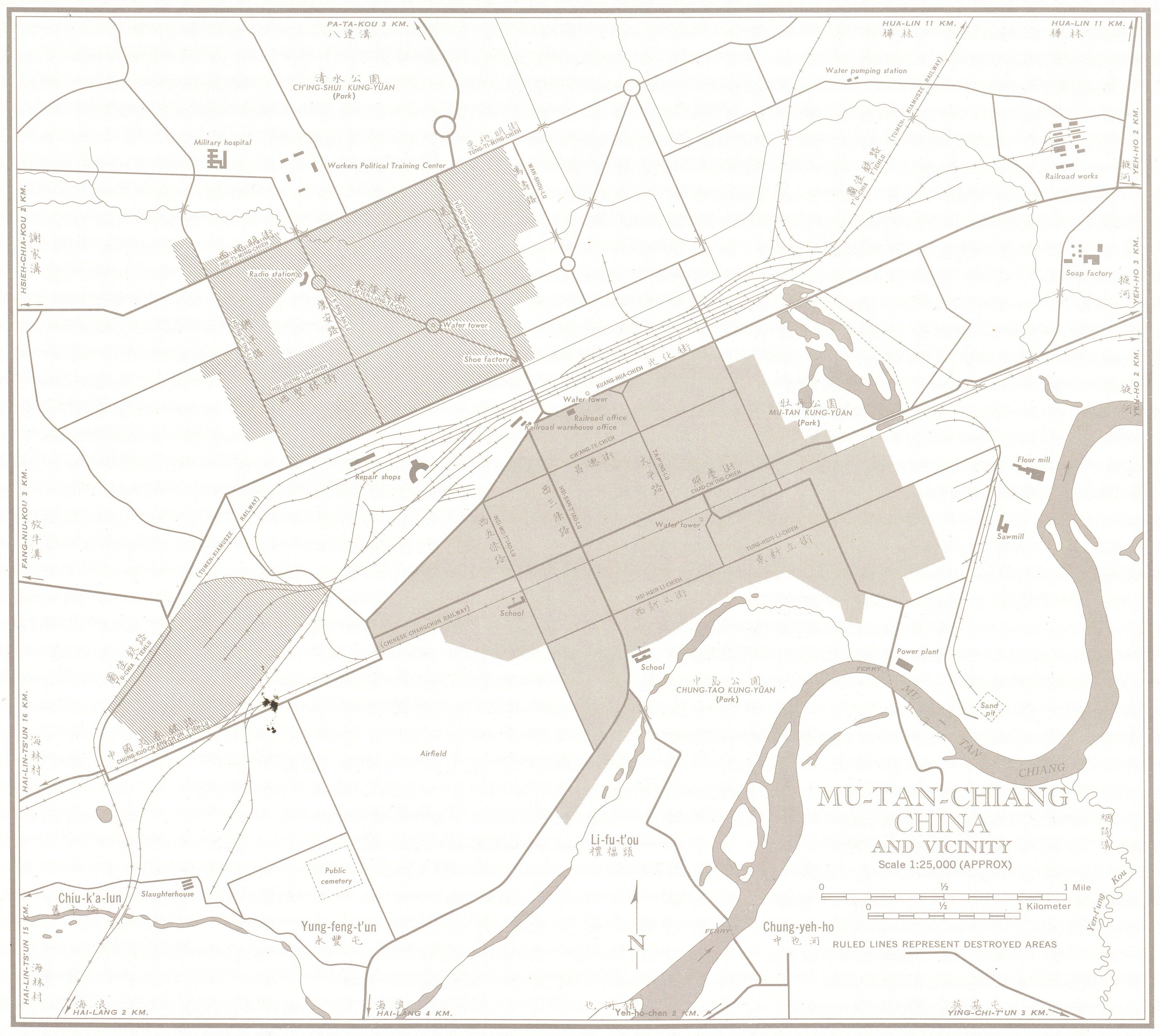
Mudanjiang (labeled as MU-TAN-CHIANG), 1950s

Mudanjiang was originally populated by the Sushen 2,300 years ago. They lived in the valley of the Mudan River, and established the State of Mo (貊國). During the Tang dynasty, Balhae established their Upper capital Longquan Fu (Yongcheon bu) near Lake Jingpo south of Mudanjiang around 755 AD. On January 14, 926, Yongcheon fell while Balhae was defeated by the Khitans.

Mudanjiang is named after the eponymous Mudan River (literally, "Peony River") flowing through it. Imperial Russia built a train station for the Chinese Eastern Railway in Mudanjiang in 1903, after which local development started boosting. Both Chinese and Russian settlers established themselves here. Mudanjiang was little more than a large village until the 1920s. By that time, Mudanjiang was strongly overshadowed by the nearby county town of Ningan (Former Ninguta). However, merchants from several countries including France, Russia, Britain and Denmark set up sub-agencies in Mudanjiang during this period, which led the trade area of the city to a rapid expansion.

After the Japanese invasion of Manchuria began on September 19, 1931, the whole Manchuria was seized by Japan following the Mukden Incident. Mudanjiang experienced a substantial growth in the 1930s under the Japanese occupation. Mudanjiang also became a military and administrative center going by the name Botankou, particularly after the railway from Tumen to Jiamusi was constructed in 1933. By that time several light industries including light engineering, lumbering, and food processing was established in the town. On December 1, 1937, Botankou City was established by the Manchukuo government, administering five counties. On October 15, 1938, Japanese Government set up a consulate in Botankou and promoted Botankou as a municipality directly under the Manchukuo Government. As Manchukuo collapsed, Mudanjiang was captured by the Soviet Army on August 16, 1945.

Mudanjiang was controlled by the Communist forces and became the capital of Songjiang Province in 1948. However, after Songjiang Province was merged into Heilongjiang Province on June 19, 1954, Mudanjiang was reduced to a prefecture-level city. The historic Beishan Stadium is located in the city. The 15,000-capacity stadium is used mostly for association football matches.

== Geography ==
Mudanjiang

Climate chart (precipitation, max. and min. temperature)
J	F	M	A	M	J	J	A	S	O	N	D
6.6 −10 −22	5.5 −5 −17	13 3 −9	26 14 1	58 21 8	85 26 14	137 28 18	122 27 17	55 22 9	31 13 1	14 1 −9	8 −8 −18
- █ Average max. and min. temperatures in °C
- █ Precipitation totals in mm
- Source: CMA
Imperial conversion
J	F	M	A	M	J	J	A	S	O	N	D
0.3 14 −7	0.2 24 1	0.5 38 17	1 58 34	2.3 70 46	3.4 78 57	5.4 82 64	4.8 81 63	2.2 71 49	1.2 56 33	0.5 35 16	0.3 18 0
- █ Average max. and min. temperatures in °F
- █ Precipitation totals in inches

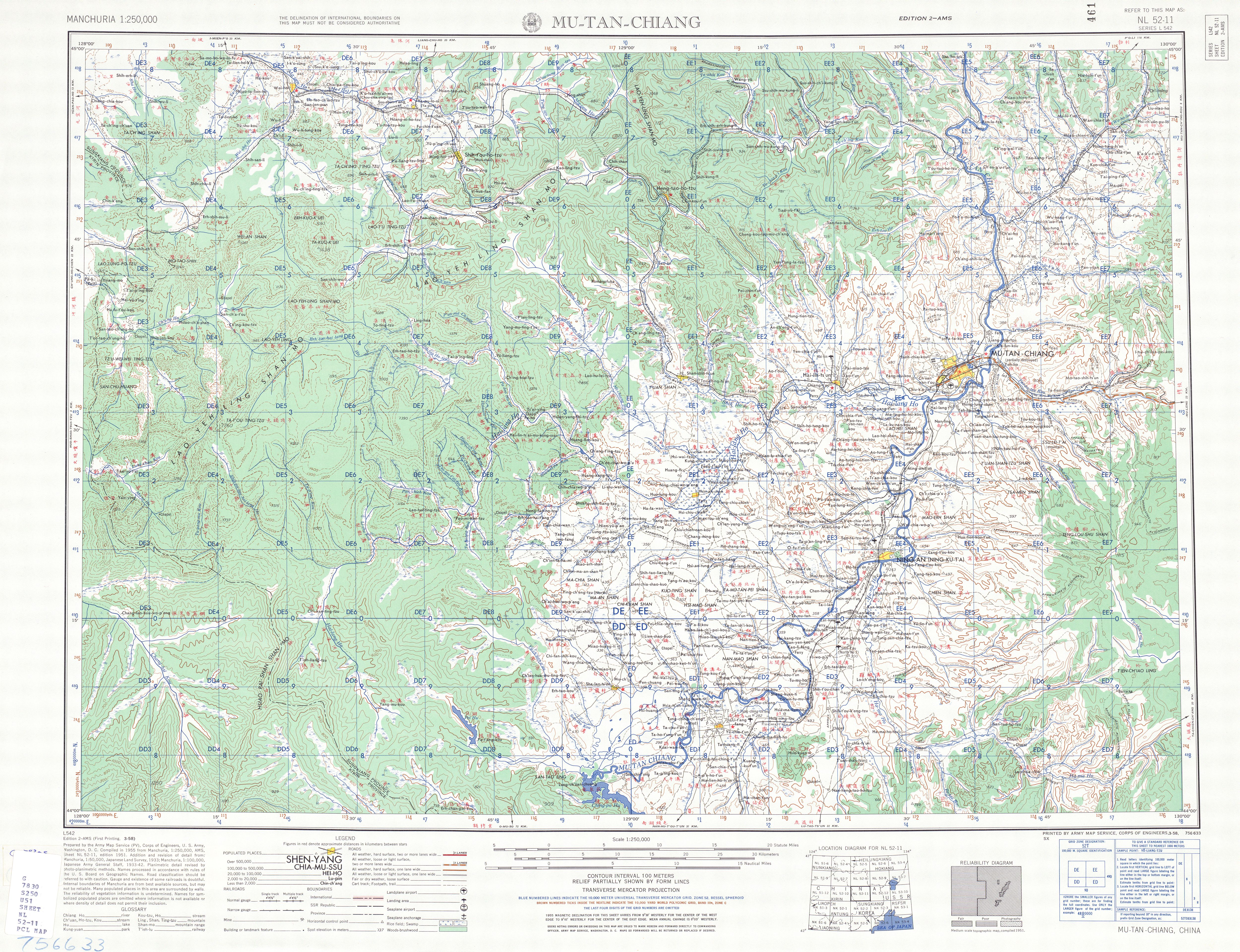
Map including Mudanjiang (labeled as MU-TAN-CHIANG (partially destroyed)) (AMS, 1955)

Mudanjiang, spanning from 128° 02' to 131° 18' E longitude and 43° 24' to 45° 59' N latitude, is located in southeastern Heilongjiang province. It is also the province's southernmost prefecture. Neighboring prefectures are:

- Harbin (W)
- Jixi (NE)
- Qitaihe (N)
- Yanbian, Jilin (S)

It also borders Russia's Primorsky Krai to the east. The average elevation in the prefecture is 230 meters (755 ft), with the terrain primarily consisting of mountains and hills. The east of the prefecture begins to ascend to the Changbai Mountains, while the central parts belong to the Hegu Basin. The lowest part of the prefecture is Suifenhe City, bordering Russia, at a minimum elevation of 86.5 meters (283.8 ft), while the highest point is Zhangguangcai mountain, at 1,686.9 meters (5,534 ft).

=== Climate ===
Mudanjiang features a monsoon-influenced, humid continental climate (Köppen Dwa) with hot, humid summers and very cold and dry winters; spring and autumn are brief. However, winter temperatures here are far warmer than much of the rest of the province, and the city's basin location helps protect it from biting winds. The monthly 24-hour average temperature ranges from −16.7 °C (1.9 °F) in January to 22.3 °C (72.1 °F) in July; the annual mean is 4.78 °C (40.6 °F). Close to three-fifths of the annual rainfall occurs from June to August. With monthly percent possible sunshine ranging from 46% in July to 62% in February and March, the city receives 2,368 hours of bright sunshine annually. Extreme temperatures have ranged from −38.3 °C (−37 °F) on January 3, 1963, to 38.4 °C (101 °F) on July 24, 1998.

Climate data for Mudanjiang, elevation 306 m (1,004 ft), (1991–2020 normals, extremes 1951–present)
Month	Jan	Feb	Mar	Apr	May	Jun	Jul	Aug	Sep	Oct	Nov	Dec	Year
Record high °C (°F)	4.6 (40.3)	13.2 (55.8)	20.4 (68.7)	30.3 (86.5)	34.5 (94.1)	37.9 (100.2)	38.4 (101.1)	36.0 (96.8)	31.9 (89.4)	29.1 (84.4)	19.5 (67.1)	9.4 (48.9)	38.4 (101.1)
Mean daily maximum °C (°F)	−10.0 (14.0)	−4.3 (24.3)	3.7 (38.7)	14.0 (57.2)	21.2 (70.2)	26.1 (79.0)	28.3 (82.9)	27.0 (80.6)	22.0 (71.6)	13.4 (56.1)	1.4 (34.5)	−8.0 (17.6)	11.2 (52.2)
Daily mean °C (°F)	−16.3 (2.7)	−11.3 (11.7)	−2.4 (27.7)	7.3 (45.1)	14.5 (58.1)	19.8 (67.6)	22.7 (72.9)	21.3 (70.3)	15.1 (59.2)	6.5 (43.7)	−4.2 (24.4)	−13.6 (7.5)	4.9 (40.9)
Mean daily minimum °C (°F)	−21.4 (−6.5)	−17.2 (1.0)	−8.1 (17.4)	1.1 (34.0)	8.3 (46.9)	14.3 (57.7)	18.0 (64.4)	16.9 (62.4)	9.5 (49.1)	0.8 (33.4)	−8.8 (16.2)	−18.1 (−0.6)	−0.4 (31.3)
Record low °C (°F)	−38.3 (−36.9)	−35.3 (−31.5)	−30.7 (−23.3)	−16.4 (2.5)	−5.8 (21.6)	2.9 (37.2)	8.0 (46.4)	6.2 (43.2)	−5.1 (22.8)	−14.2 (6.4)	−27.3 (−17.1)	−35.6 (−32.1)	−38.3 (−36.9)
Average precipitation mm (inches)	6.7 (0.26)	5.5 (0.22)	14.8 (0.58)	28.0 (1.10)	64.5 (2.54)	83.5 (3.29)	130.8 (5.15)	122.8 (4.83)	58.7 (2.31)	33.6 (1.32)	20.5 (0.81)	7.7 (0.30)	577.1 (22.71)
Average precipitation days (≥ 0.1 mm)	4.7	4.2	7.1	8.3	13.7	15.3	13.9	14.1	10.3	8.0	6.6	5.9	112.1
Average snowy days	7.9	7.2	9.3	4.0	0.1	0	0	0	0.1	2.4	8.1	9.5	48.6
Average relative humidity (%)	67	61	56	52	58	67	74	77	73	65	65	67	65
Mean monthly sunshine hours	157.9	182.4	211.3	203.0	221.1	220.4	207.8	193.8	211.1	188.5	148.5	142.5	2,288.3
Percentage possible sunshine	55	62	57	50	48	48	45	45	57	56	52	52	52
Source: China Meteorological Administration extremes all-time February high

== Administrative divisions ==
Map
#	Name	Hanzi	Hanyu Pinyin	Population (2003 est.)	Area (km^{2})	Density (/km^{2})
1	Aimin District	爱民区	Àimín Qū	230,000	359	641
2	Dong'an District	东安区	Dōng'ān Qū	180,000	566	318
3	Yangming District	阳明区	Yángmíng Qū	160,000	358	447
4	Xi'an District	西安区	Xī'ān Qū	210,000	325	646
5	Muling City	穆棱市	Mùlíng Shì	330,000	6,094	54
6	Suifenhe City	绥芬河市	Suífēnhé Shi	60,000	427	141
7	Hailin City	海林市	Hǎilín Shì	440,000	9,877	45
8	Ning'an City	宁安市	Níng'ān Shì	440,000	7,870	56
9	Dongning City	东宁市	Dōngníng Shì	210,000	7,368	29
10	Linkou County	林口县	Línkǒu Xiàn	450,000	7,191	63

== Economy ==
In 2010, the city's GDP rose 18.5% to RMB 78.1 billion, ranked fourth in Heilongjiang Province after Harbin, Daqing and Qiqihar. Tourist industry and light manufacturing are the mainstays of Mudanjiang's economy. Mudanjiang's pillar industries include accessory industry for automobiles, paper making, forest industry, petrochemicals, new materials, pharmacy and energy industry. The foreign trade value increased 71.8% to US$9 billion in 2010, making up three-fourths of Heilongjiang Province's gross.

=== Development zones ===
- Mudanjiang to Russia Economic and Technological Development Zone
- Sino-Russian Information Industrial Garden
- Mudanjiang Jiangnan Economic and Technological Development Area
- Mudanjiang Bioindustry Development Zone
- Heilongjiang Northern Pharmaceutical Technological Development Zone

== Transport ==
=== Railway ===
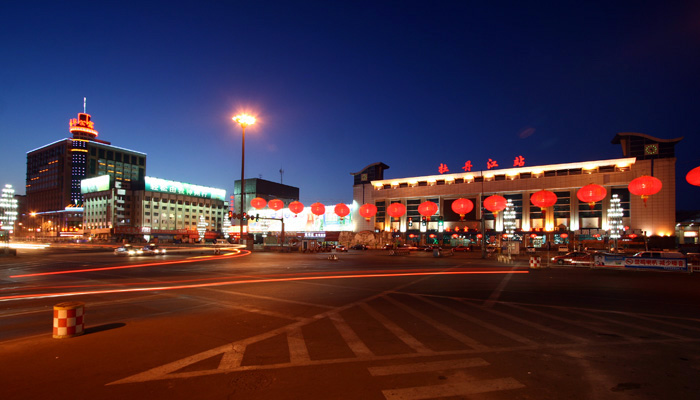
Mudanjiang railway station, lunar new year 2008

Mudanjiang is a railway hub in eastern Heilongjiang Province. Binsui (Harbin-Suifenhe) Railway and Tujia (Tumen-Jiamusi) Railway meet here. Trains from Mudanjiang Railway Station connect the city with Beijing, Jinan, Dalian, Harbin, Changchun and several other cities in China.

=== Air ===
Mudanjiang Hailang International Airport is the second largest international airport in Heilongjiang Province. It currently does not operate any flights as it is closed for renovation works.

=== Highway ===
Mudanjiang is linked to the national highway network through the G11 Hegang–Dalian Expressway and G10 Suifenhe-Manzhouli Expressway.

== Education ==
Mudanjiang Normal University is a provincial higher education institution in Heilongjiang Province. The predecessor of the college is the Nenjiang Branch of Northeast Agricultural College. It was founded in September 1958 and was closed in 1964. The Bei'an Teachers' College was established on the basis of the closed Nenjiang branch. The State Council approved in January 1965. In 1964, Bei'an Normal College moved to the original Ning'an County Breeding Farm, renamed Ning'an Teachers' College of Heilongjiang Province. It was approved by the Heilongjiang Provincial Revolutionary Committee in December 1970 and expanded into Mudanjiang Teachers College. The school has now developed into a master's degree. Full-time undergraduate students, international students, adult education, and other comprehensive teachers' colleges with more than 22,000 students. The school covers an area of 1.05 million square meters, and the school building area is nearly 390,000 square meters. It is a provincial-level garden-style unit. The school recruits students nationwide and now has 15 secondary colleges. In 2015, Mudanjiang Teachers College will be renamed Normal University. On February 26, 2023, Soft Science 2023 "China's Best University Ranking" was released, and Mudanjiang Teachers College ranked 459.

Mudanjiang University was founded in 1983 and is the first batch of 100 local universities in the country. The school consists of three parts: the school headquarters, the Hailin campus and the industrial park training base. It covers an area of 500,000 square meters and a building area of 186,000 square meters. The total value of fixed assets is 450 million yuan, the total value of teaching equipment is 90 million yuan, and the library has 644,800 books. At present, there are more than 10,000 students in the school, 10 secondary schools and 43 majors. Among them, there are 2 key construction majors supported by the central government and 6 key construction majors supported by the provincial finance. The school is well equipped and the school conditions are good. There are 104 on-campus laboratories and training bases, and 125 off-campus training bases. The major in mechatronics, animation design and production, and computer information security storage was identified by the Ministry of Education as a national backbone teacher training base. Mudanjiang No. 1 High School, referred to as Mudanjiang Yizhong, is located in Mudanjiang City, southeast of Heilongjiang Province, and is the first demonstration high school in Heilongjiang Province. Founded in September 1945, it was originally named Mudanjiang Municipal High School; in 2001, it was renamed Mudanjiang No. 1 High School; in September 2007, the school moved to the new campus as a whole. The new campus covers an area of 218,000 square meters and the construction area is 9.3. 10,000 square meters, green area of 73,000 square meters, sports area of 70,000 square meters. In 2009, it was awarded the National 100 High School Construction Project Experimental School; in 2011, it was identified as a pilot school for provincial science projects. As of February 2015, there were 359 faculty members, 123 teachers with master's degree, 8 special teachers, 144 senior teachers, 107 national, provincial and municipal academic leaders and backbone teachers, and more than 5,200 students.

== International relations ==
Mudanjiang is twinned with:

- Ussuriysk, Primorsky Krai, Russia
- Municipality of Mosman, Sydney, New South Wales, Australia
- Paju, Gyeonggi-do, South Korea
- Ōtsu, Shiga, Japan
- Jyväskylä, Finland
- Potsdam, Brandenburg, Germany
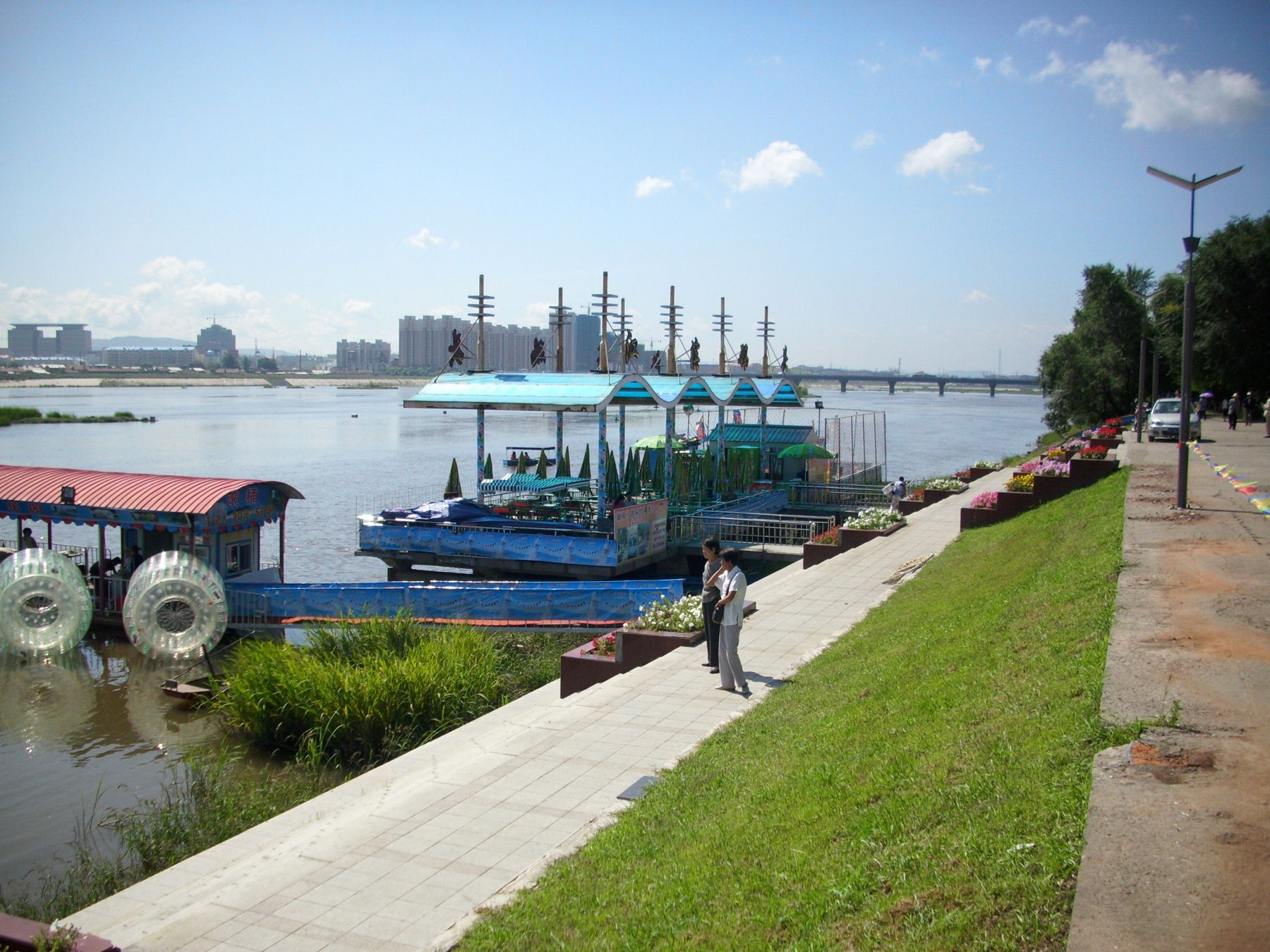
Walking along the Mudan River

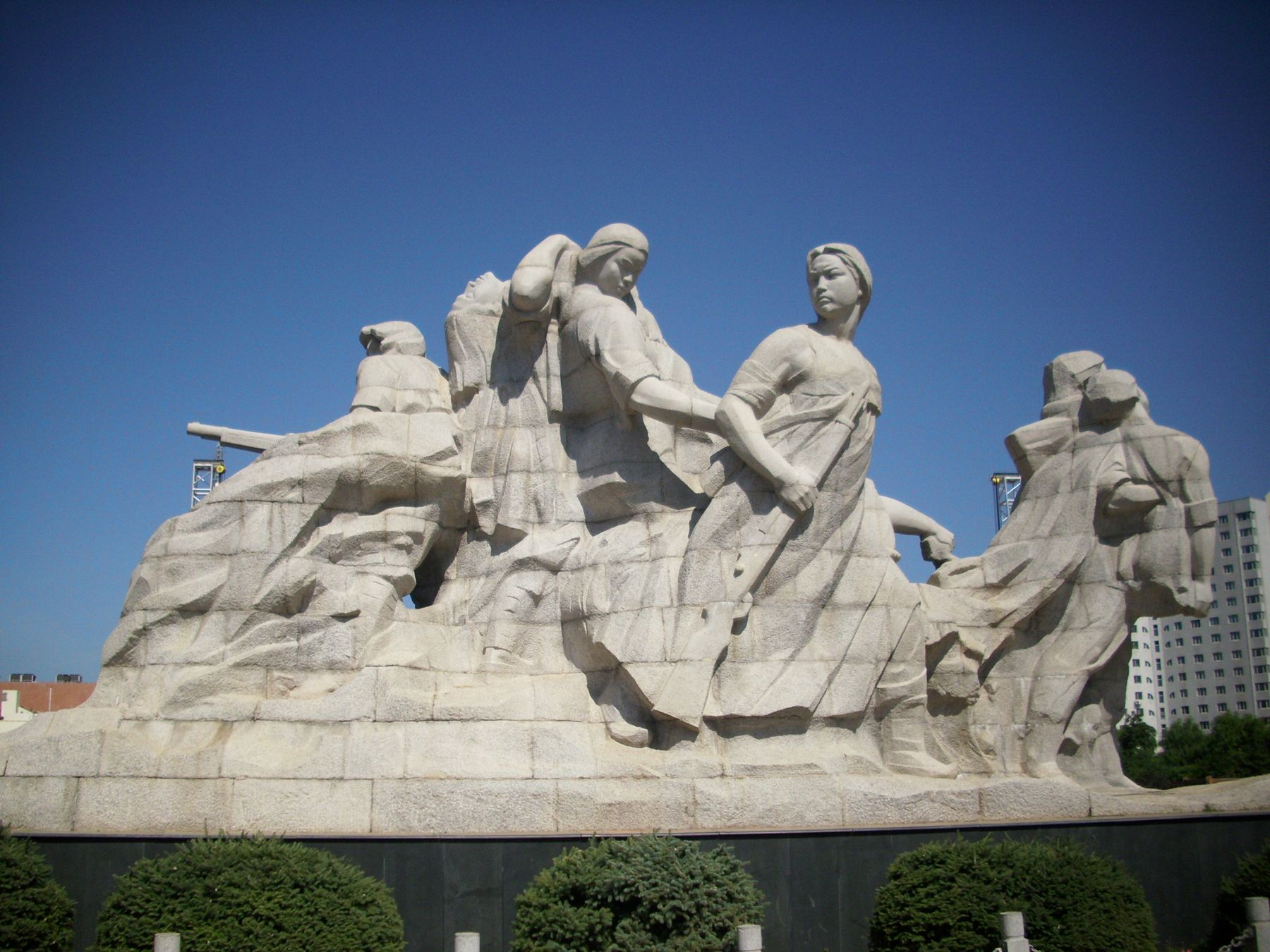
Monument to the women fallen in war

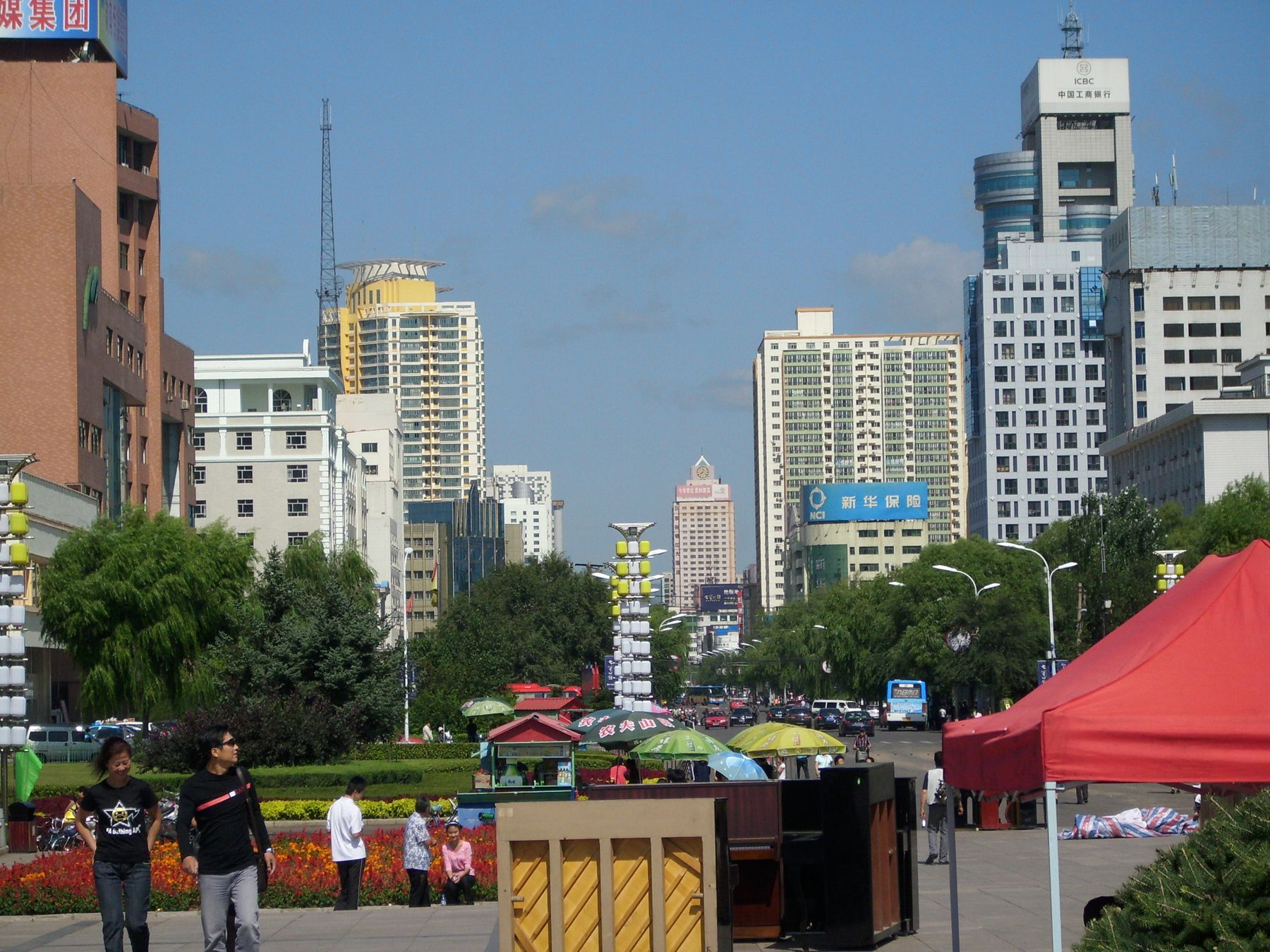
The main street of the city

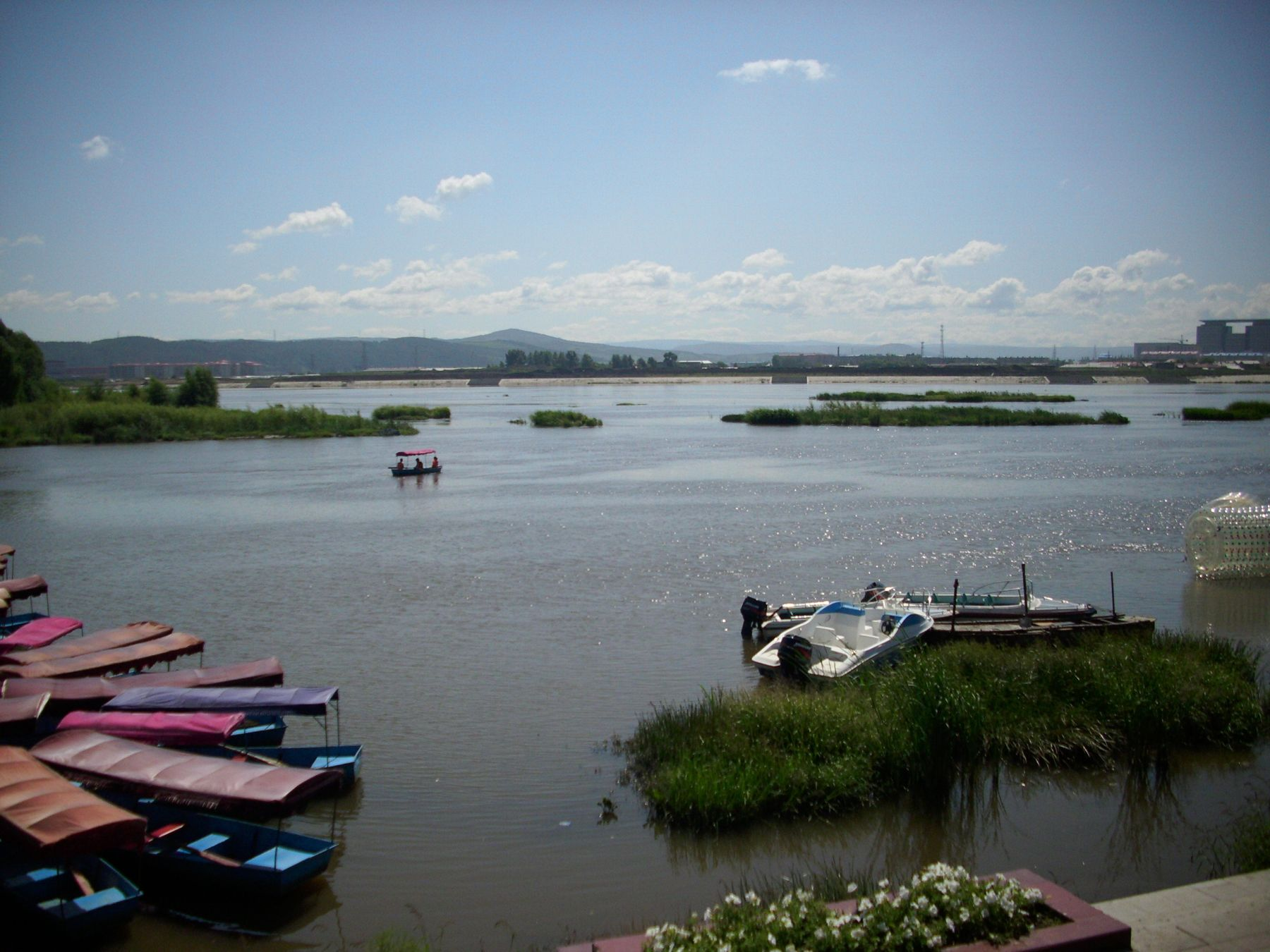
Panoramic view on the river

== Notable people ==
- Zhang Guimei (born 1957), Secretary of the Party Branch and Principal of the Huaping Girls' Senior High School in Lijiang
- Ning Zhongyan (born 3 November 1999), is a Chinese speed skater. On 19 February 2026, he won gold medal in the 1500 metres, with an Olympic record time of 1:41.98.
