= Manchurian mixed forests =

Ecoregion in Korea, China, and Russia

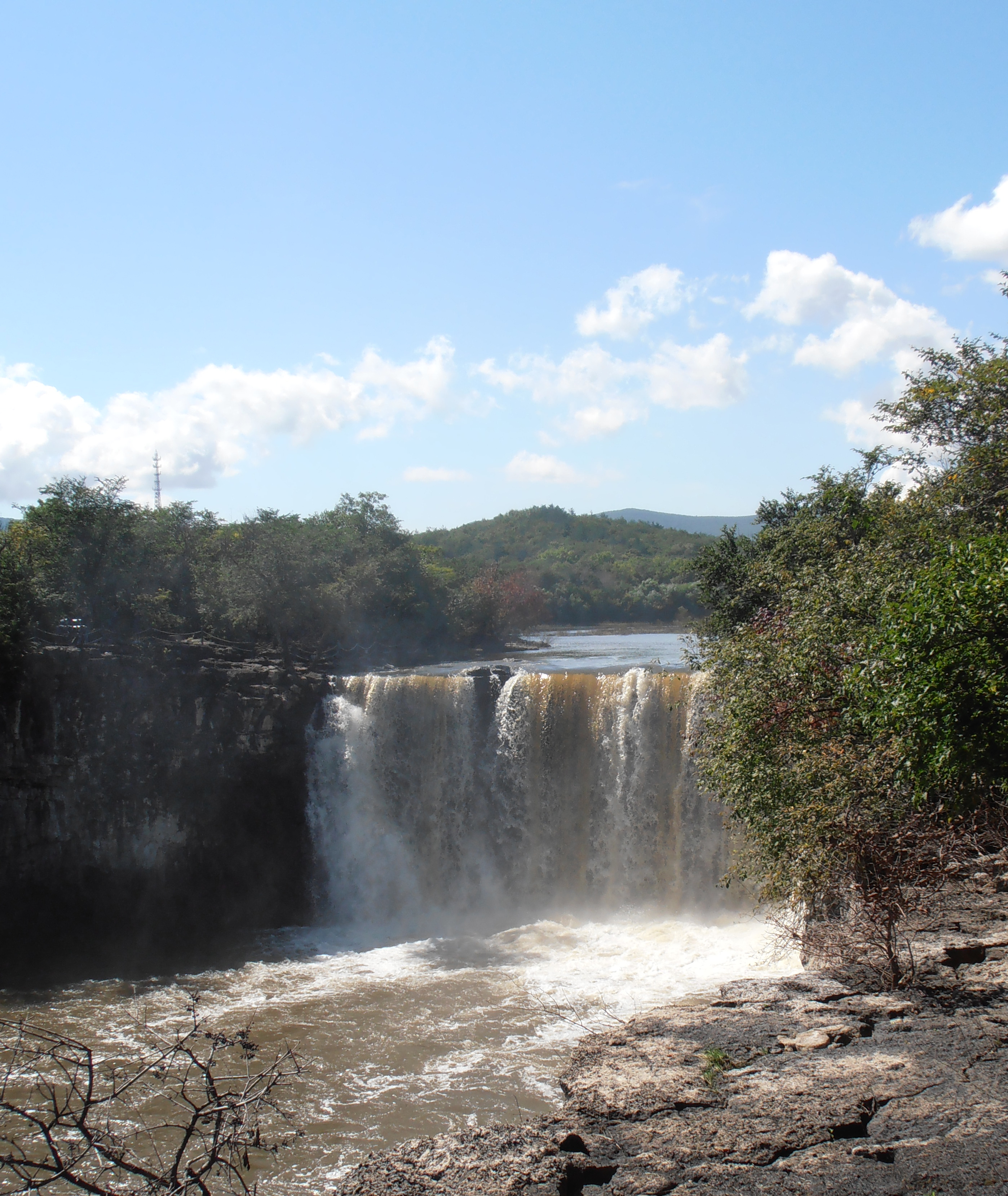
- DiuSeoiLau Waterfall

- Ecoregion territory (in purple)

Ecology
- Realm: Palearctic
- Biome: Temperate broadleaf and mixed forests
- Borders: List: Amur meadow steppe; Central Korean deciduous forests; Changbai Mountains mixed forests; Da Hinggan-Dzhagdy Mountains conifer forests; Mongolian-Manchurian grassland; Northeast China Plain deciduous forests; Okhotsk-Manchurian taiga; Ussuri broadleaf and mixed forests

Geography
- Area: 504,828 km^{2} (194,915 mi^{2})
- Countries: China; Russia; North Korea; South Korea
- Coordinates: 47°45′N 128°45′E

Conservation
- Protected: 57,139 km² (11%)

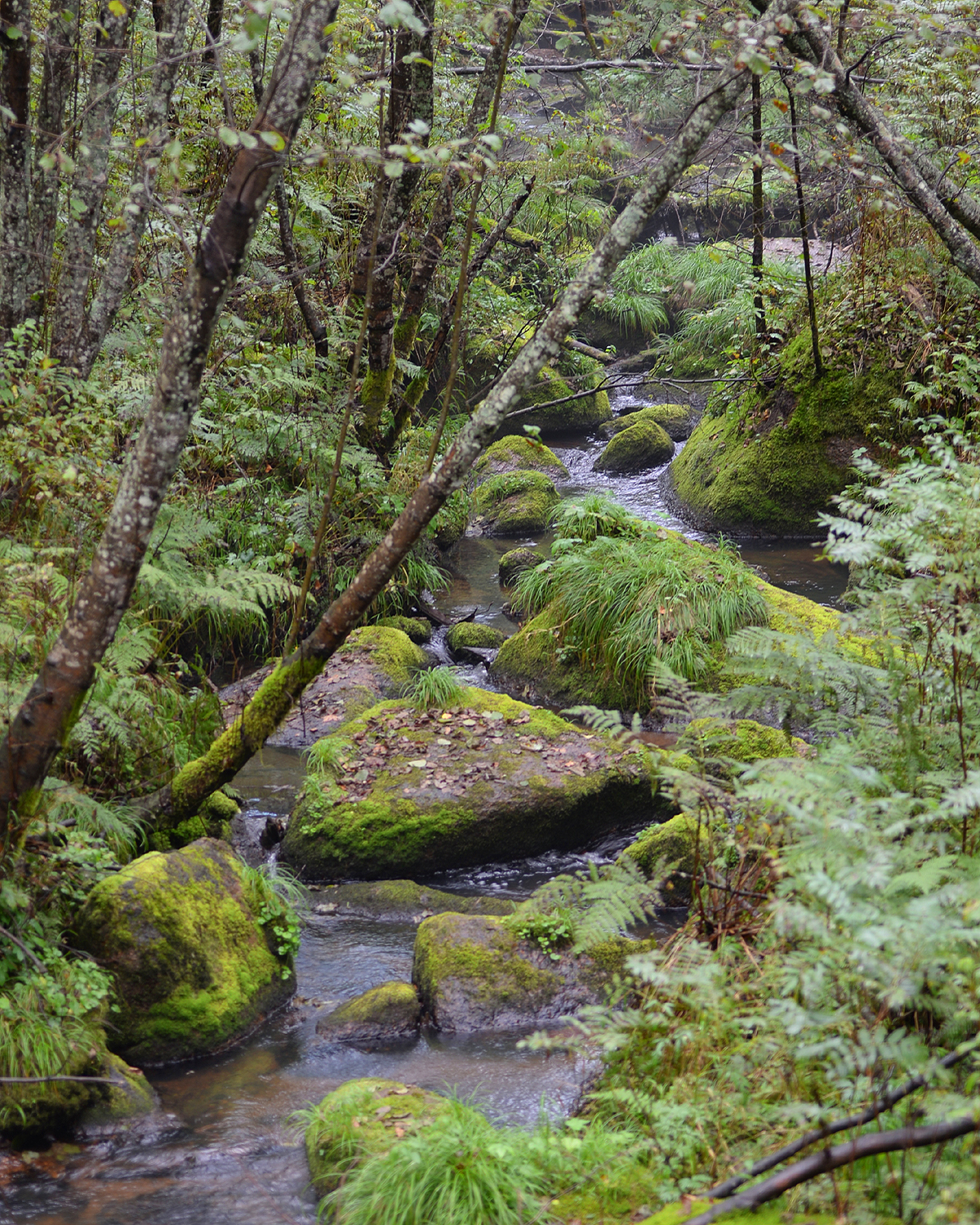
Xiangshui Creek, Wuying National Forest Park, Heilongjiang, China (6 September 2016)

The Manchurian mixed forests ecoregion (WWF ID: PA0426) covers the forested hills surrounding the river plains of northern China, Russia, North Korea, and South Korea. The ecoregion supports a number of rare species due to the relative isolation, the diversity of habitat, with mixed forests of deciduous Mongolian oak and conifers of Korean pine. Because mountains rise above the region on three sides, with plains and wetlands below, the area supports high biodiversity as a transition zone.

== Location and description ==
The ecoregion occupies the middle-elevation slopes of three surrounding mountain ranges: the eastern slopes of the Greater Khingan Mountains, the southern slopes of the Lesser Khingan, and the western slopes of the Changbai Mountains. The southern section of the ecoregion surrounds the higher Changbai Mountains mixed forests ecoregion, while the middle section encircles most of the lower-elevation Northeast China Plain deciduous forests ecoregion, and the northern half of the ecoregion surrounds the lower western sector of the Amur meadow steppe ecoregion.

== Climate ==
The climate of the ecoregion is Humid continental climate, warm summer (Köppen climate classification (Dwb)), with a dry winter. This climate is characterized by large seasonal temperature differentials and a warm summer (at least four months averaging over 10 °C (50 °F), but no month averaging over 22 °C (72 °F), and cold winters having monthly precipitation less than one-tenth of the wettest summer month. Precipitation varies by location, ranging from 500 to 1000 mm/year. Summer and Fall are the wet season.

== Flora and Fauna ==
Because the ecoregion ranges from 37 to 53 degrees north latitude, its forests contain more conifers than the deciduous forests to the south. On the eastern side, the most common conifers are Korean pine (Pinus koraiensis), Manchurian fir (Abies holophylla), and Siberian spruce (Picea obovata). Deciduous trees include Mongolian oak (Quercus mongolica), Manchurian ash (Fraxinus mandschurica), Amur linden (Tilia amurensis), and Manchurian elm (Ulmus laciniata). On the western side, common conifers include Scots pine (Pinus sylvestris).

The forests are home to wildlife such as the Ussuri brown bear (Ursus arctos lasiotus), Ussuri black bear (Ursus thibetanus ussuricus), Manchurian wapiti (Cervus canadensis xanthopygus), Manchurian sika deer (Cervus nippon mantchuricus), common raccoon dog (Nyctereutes procyonoides), wolves (Canis lupus), red foxes (Vulpes vulpes), and wild boar (Sus scrofa). The endangered Siberian tiger (Panthera tigris tigris) and Amur leopard (Panthera pardus orientalis) are also found here.

== Protected areas ==
A 2017 assessment found that 57,139 km², or 11%, of the ecoregion is in protected areas. Little forest remains outside the protected areas. Protected areas include Heishan Scenic Area, Huazishan Scenic Area, Jiguan Mountain Scenic Area, Laozumu Peak Scenic Area, Menggu Mountain Scenic Area, Wanfo Mountain Scenic Area, Xiangmoshan Scenic Area, and Xinglong National Forest Park in China, Land of the Leopard National Park in Russia, and Seoraksan National Park in South Korea.

== See also ==
- List of ecoregions in China
