= Munsusan =

Munsusan (문수산) is the name of several mountains in Korea:

- Munsusan (North Gyeongsang), in Bonghwa, North Gyeongsang Province, 1207 metres
- Munsusan (South Jeolla/North Jeolla), in Jangseong, South Jeolla Province, and Gochang, North Jeolla Province, 621 metres
- Munsusan (Ulsan), in Ulju, Ulsan, 600 metres
- Munsusan (Gyeonggi), in Gimpo, Gyeonggi Province, 376 metres

== See also ==
- Munsubong (disambiguation)
