= Munsubong =

Munsubong (문수봉; 文殊峰) is the name of two mountains in South Korea:

- Munsubong (Jecheon, Chungcheongbuk-do/Mungyeong, Gyeongsangbuk-do)
- Munsubong (Taebaek, Gangwon-do/Bonghwa, Gyeongsangbuk-do)

== See also ==
- Munsusan (disambiguation)
