= Retinia monopunctata =

Scientific classification
- Domain: Eukaryota
- Kingdom: Animalia
- Phylum: Arthropoda
- Class: Insecta
- Order: Lepidoptera
- Family: Tortricidae
- Genus: Retinia
- Species: R. monopunctata

Binomial name
- Retinia monopunctata (Oku, 1968)

Synonyms
- Petrova monopunctata Oku, 1968; Petrova pini Kuznetzov, 1969

Species of moth

Retinia monopunctata is a moth of the family Tortricidae. It is found in Japan (on the islands of Hokkaido, Honshu and Shikoku), northern China (Shanxi, Heilongjiang, Fujian and Shaanxi) and Russia (Primorsky Krai).

The wingspan is 11–17 mm. Adults are on wing from early May to mid-June. There is one generation per year.

The larvae feed on Abies sachalinensis, Abies homolepis, Picea polita, Picea glehnii, Picea jezoensis, Picea abies, Abies holophylla, Pinus strobus, Larix kaempferi and Pinus koraiensis. The larvae feed in cones and shoots of their host plants. It was little known as a pest until 1986, but is now considered to be a serious pest.
