= Gyemyeongsan =

Mountain in South Korea

Highest point
- Elevation: 774 m (2,539 ft)
- Coordinates: 36°59′24″N 127°58′37″E

Geography
- Location: Chungju, South Korea

Korean name
- Hangul: 계명산
- Hanja: 鷄鳴山
- RR: Gyemyeongsan
- MR: Kyemyŏngsan

Gyemyeongsan (Korean: 계명산) is a mountain located in Chungju, South Korea. It has an elevation of 774 m (2,539 ft).

Gyemyeongsan guards Chungju, and it is known for its beauty with its impressively-shaped peaks Ambong.

The park at Mount Gyemyeong sticks out toward Lake Chungju like a fist. This little mountaintop is known as Mount Simhang. Jongdaengi-gil is a forest road that circles Mount Simhang.

== See also ==
- Geography of Korea
- List of mountains in Korea
- List of mountains by elevation
