= Galgisan =

Mountain in Gangwon Province, South Korea

Highest point
- Elevation: 685 m (2,247 ft)
- Coordinates: 37°34′41″N 127°47′02″E

Geography
- Location: Gyeonggi Province, South Korea

Korean name
- Hangul: 갈기산
- Hanja: 葛基山
- RR: Galgisan
- MR: Kalgisan

Galgisan (Korean: 갈기산) is a mountain located in Yangpyeong County, Gyeonggi Province, and Hongcheon County, Gangwon Province, South Korea. It has an elevation of 685 m (2,247 ft).

== See also ==
- Geography of Korea
- List of mountains in Korea
- List of mountains by elevation
