= Namamsan =

Mountain in Ulsan, South Korea

Highest point
- Elevation: 543 m (1,781 ft)
- Coordinates: 35°30′47″N 129°13′01″E

Geography
- Location: Ulsan, South Korea

Korean name
- Hangul: 남암산
- Hanja: 南巖山
- RR: Namamsan
- MR: Namamsan

Namamsan is a mountain located in Ulju County, Ulsan, South Korea. It has an elevation of 543 m (1,781 ft).

== See also ==
- Geography of Korea
- List of mountains in Korea
- List of mountains by elevation
