= Gaseopsan =

Mountain in Chungju, South Korea

Highest point
- Elevation: 710 m (2,330 ft)
- Coordinates: 36°58′01″N 127°42′18″E

Geography
- Location: Chungju, South Korea

Korean name
- Hangul: 가섭산
- Hanja: 迦葉山
- RR: Gaseopsan
- MR: Kasŏpsan

Gaseopsan (Korean: 가섭산) is a mountain located in Chungju, South Korea. It has an elevation of 710 m (2,329 ft).

== See also ==
- Geography of Korea
- List of mountains in Korea
- List of mountains by elevation
