= Hwajangsan =

Mountain in South Korea

Highest point
- Elevation: 285 m (935 ft)
- Coordinates: 35°27′14″N 129°15′00″E

Geography
- Location: Ulsan, South Korea

Korean name
- Hangul: 화장산
- Hanja: 花藏山
- RR: Hwajangsan
- MR: Hwajangsan

Hwajangsan is a mountain located in Ulju County, Ulsan, South Korea. It has an elevation of 285 m (935 ft).

== See also ==
- Geography of Korea
- List of mountains in Korea
- List of mountains by elevation
