= Gyeryongsan (South Gyeongsang Province) =

Mountain in Geoje, South Korea

Highest point
- Elevation: 566 m (1,857 ft)
- Coordinates: 34°52′17″N 128°36′29″E

Geography
- Location: Geoje, South Korea

Korean name
- Hangul: 계룡산
- Hanja: 鷄龍山
- RR: Gyeryongsan
- MR: Kyeryongsan

Gyeryongsan (Korean: 계룡산) is a mountain located in Geoje, South Korea. It has an elevation of 566 m (1,857 ft).

== See also ==
- Geography of Korea
- List of mountains in Korea
- List of mountains by elevation
