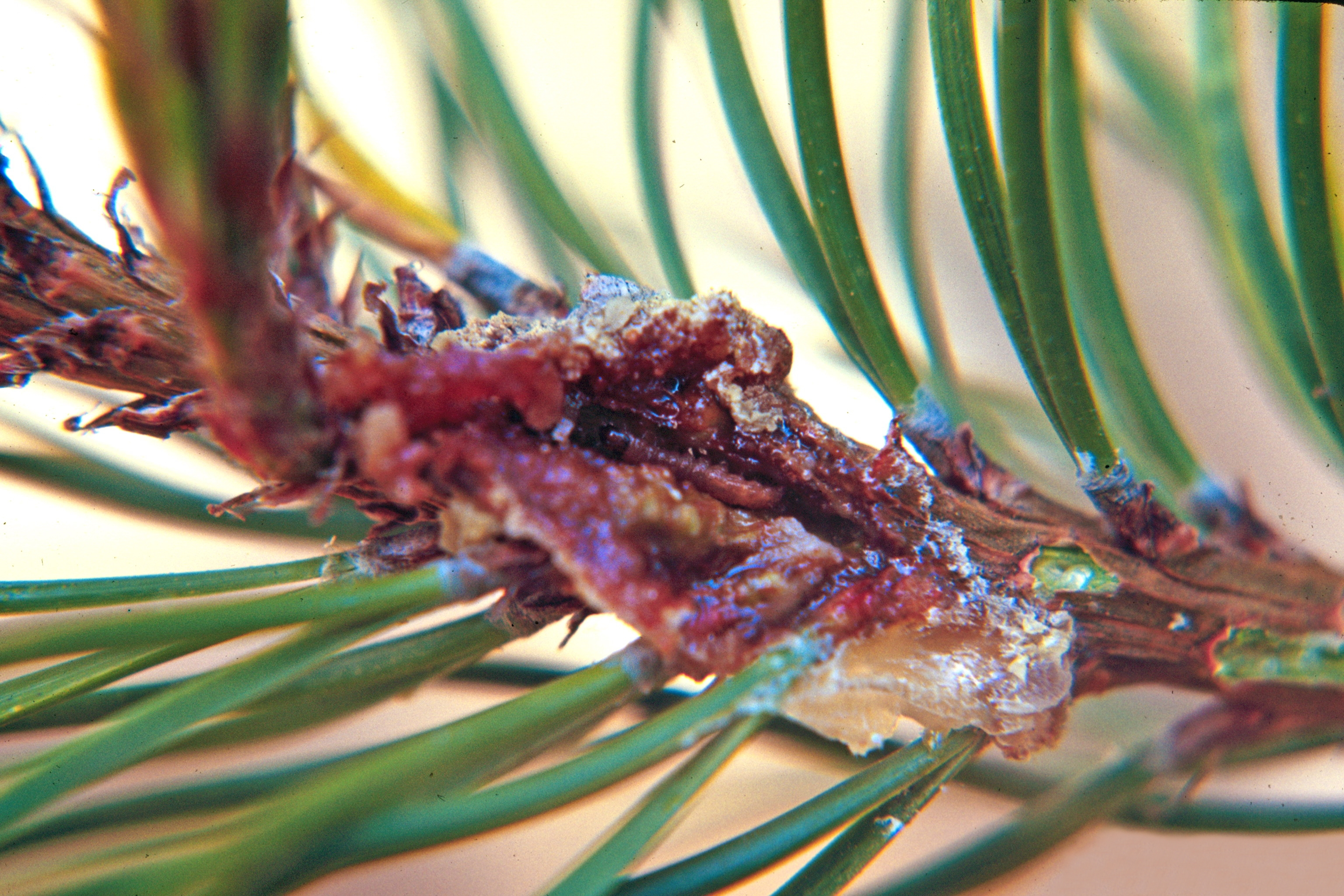
- Larva

Scientific classification
- Domain: Eukaryota
- Kingdom: Animalia
- Phylum: Arthropoda
- Class: Insecta
- Order: Lepidoptera
- Family: Tortricidae
- Genus: Retinia
- Species: R. albicapitana

Binomial name
- Retinia albicapitana (Busck, 1914)

Synonyms
- Evetria albicapitana Busck, 1914

= Retinia albicapitana =

Species of moth

Retinia albicapitana, the northern pitch twig moth, is a moth of the family Tortricidae. In Canada it is found from Nova Scotia to British Columbia and north probably into the southern parts of the Northwest Territories. In the United States, it extends as far south as Montana and the Great Lakes states.

The wingspan is 14–21 mm. Adults are on wing from June to July.

The larvae feed on Pinus banksiana, Pinus contorta, Pinus mugo, Pinus ponderosa, Pinus resinosa and Pinus sylvestris. Larvae take two years to become adults.

== Gallery ==
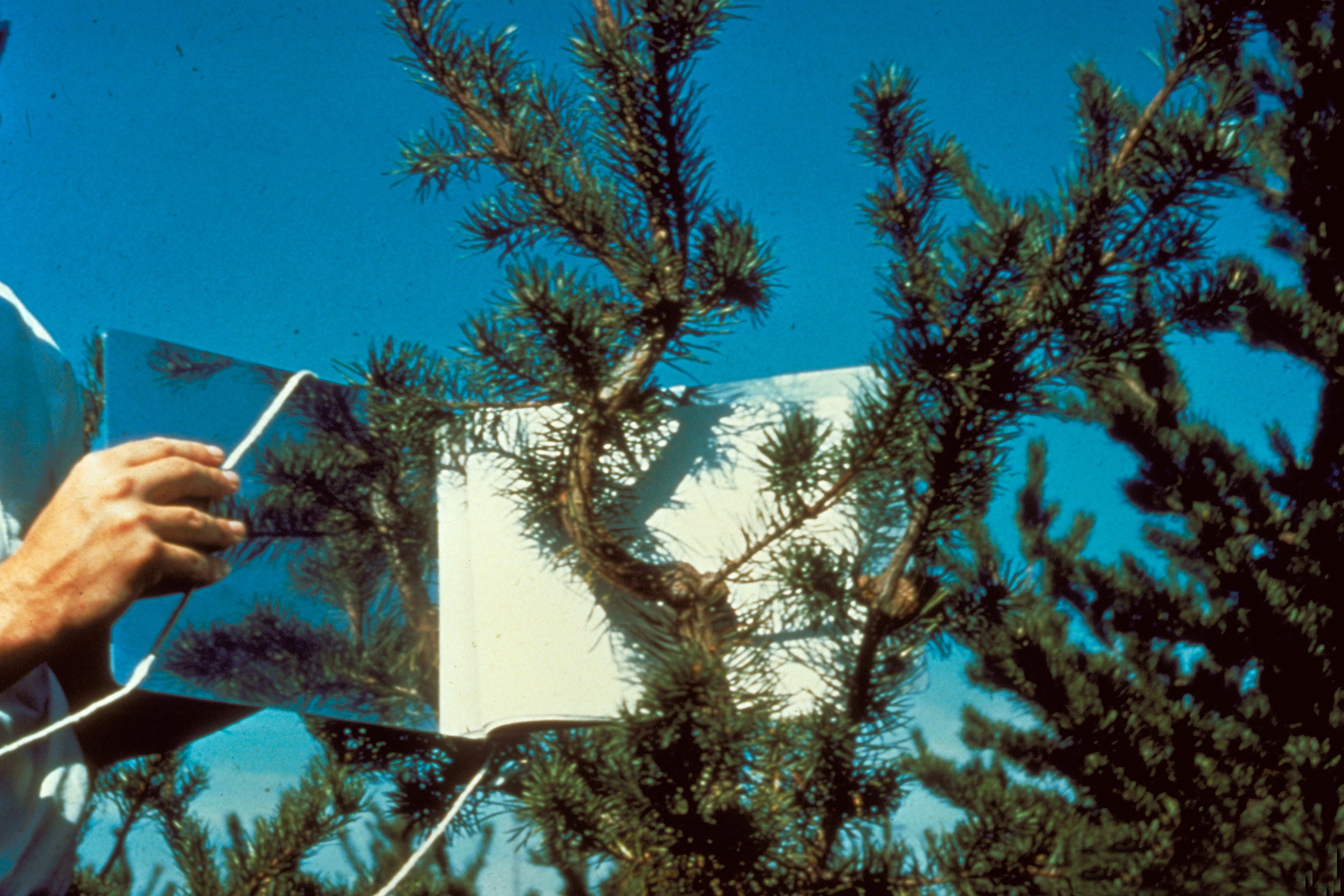
Damage

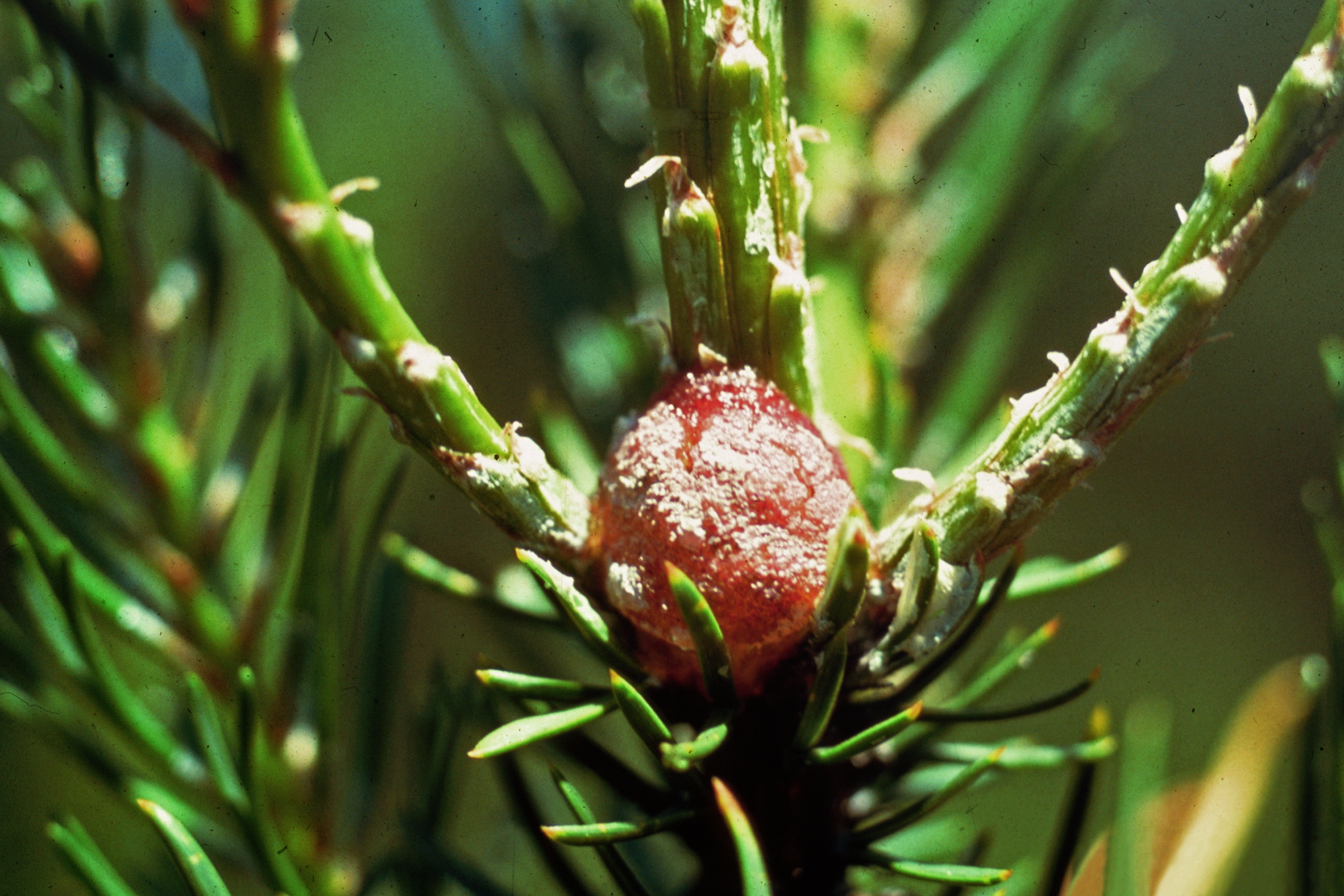
Pitch nodule
