= Retinia impropria =

Scientific classification
- Kingdom: Animalia
- Phylum: Arthropoda
- Class: Insecta
- Order: Lepidoptera
- Family: Tortricidae
- Genus: Retinia
- Species: R. impropria

Binomial name
- Retinia impropria (Meyrick, 1932)

Synonyms
- Eucosma impropria Meyrick, 1932; Grapholitha perangustana Snellen, 1883; Laspeyresia zonovae Florow, 1951

Species of moth

Retinia impropria is a species of moth of the family Tortricidae. It is found in China (Inner Mongolia, Jilin, Heilongjiang, Yunnan), Japan, Mongolia and Russia.

The larvae feed on Larix decidua, Larix sibirica, Larix polonica and Larix dahurica.
