= Changbai Mountains mixed forests =

Ecoregion in China and North Korea

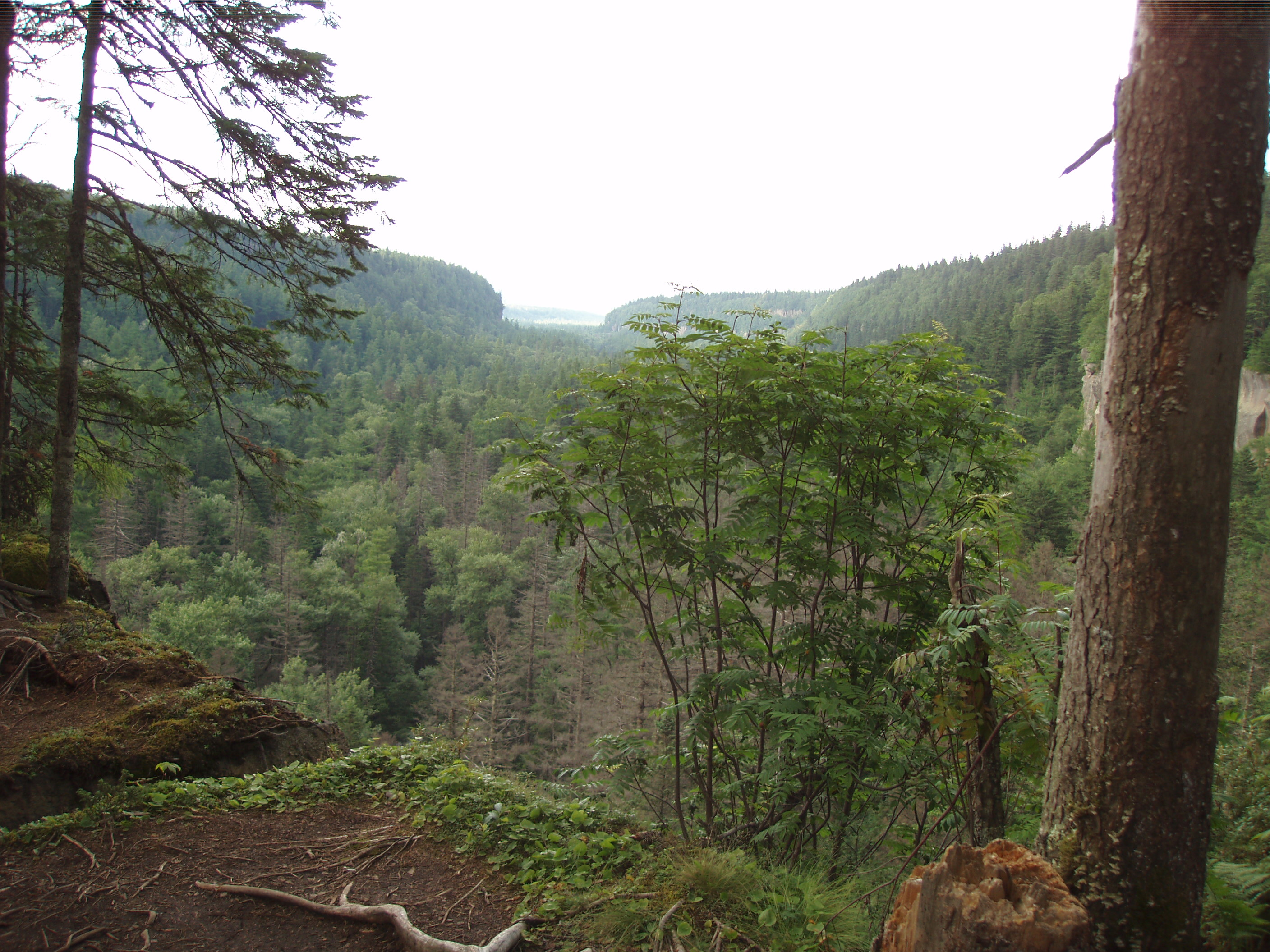
- Forest in Changbai Mountain

- Ecoregion territory (in purple)

Ecology
- Realm: Palearctic
- Biome: Temperate broadleaf and mixed forest

Geography
- Area: 93,240 km^{2} (36,000 sq mi)
- Countries: China, North Korea
- Coordinates: 41°45′N 127°45′E

The Changbai Mountains mixed forests ecoregion (WWF ID: PA0414) covers the Changbai Mountains and surrounding foothills in China and North Korea. The region features extensive and naturally preserved deciduous and conifer forests. The region exhibits high biodiversity due to its relative isolation, temperate climate with high rainfall, and centrality to central Chinese, Siberian, and European floral communities. In 1979, a significant portion of the ecoregion was designated the Changbaishan Biosphere Reserve by UNESCO.

== Location and description ==
The Changbai Mountains area ranges across the foothills and higher elevations of a volcanic plateau on the north of the Korean peninsula, straddling the border between China and North Korea. The region is surrounded by the lower terrain of the Manchurian mixed forests ecoregion, but is centered on the volcanic crater of Paektu Mountain.

== Climate ==
The climate of the Changbai ecoregion is Humid continental climate, warm summer (Köppen climate classification (Dwb)), with a dry winter. This climate is characterized by large seasonal temperature differentials and a warm summer (at least four months averaging over 10 °C (50 °F), but no month averaging over 22 °C (72 °F), and cold winters having monthly precipitation less than one-tenth of the wettest summer month. Annual precipitation is 500 to 1,000 mm at the lower and middle elevations, reaching 1,400 mm at the higher points.

== Flora and fauna ==
Because the ecoregion includes altitudes from below 1,100 meters to above 2,600 meters, it features different floristic altitude zones. From the lower altitudes, deciduous trees mixed with conifers characterize the forest up to about the 1,100 meter level. A "dark conifer" belt runs from 1,100 meters to 1,900 meters, and alpine meadows and bare rock at the higher elevations.

The mixed forests feature Korean pine (Pinus koraiensis), Manchurian fir (Abies holophylla), Manchuran lime (Tilia), and Mongolian oak (Quercus mongolica). The higher dark conifer forest features Yezo spruce (Picea jezoensis), Khingan fir (Abies nephrolepis), and Olgan larch (Larix olgensis).

== See also ==
- Ecoregions in China
