= Retinia immanitana =

Scientific classification
- Domain: Eukaryota
- Kingdom: Animalia
- Phylum: Arthropoda
- Class: Insecta
- Order: Lepidoptera
- Family: Tortricidae
- Genus: Retinia
- Species: R. immanitana

Binomial name
- Retinia immanitana (Kuznetzov, 1969)

Synonyms
- Petrova immanitana Kuznetsov, 1969

Species of moth

Retinia immanitana is a species of moth of the family Tortricidae. It is found in China (Tianjin, Shandong) and Russia.

The larvae feed on Pinus koraiensis.
