= Khingan Nature Reserve =

Strict nature reserve in Amur Oblast, Russia

- Russian: Хинганский заповедник (Also: Khingansky)
- IUCN category Ia (strict nature reserve)
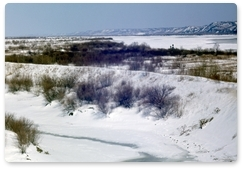
- Khingan Zapovednik

- Location within Russia
- Location: Amur Oblast
- Nearest city: Arkhara
- Coordinates: 49°1′1″N 130°26′49″E
- Area: 93,995 hectares (232,267 acres; 363 sq mi)
- Established: 1963
- Governing body: Ministry of Natural Resources and Environment (Russia)
- Website: http://www.khingan.ru/

Ramsar Wetland
- Official name: Khingano-Arkharinskaya Lowland
- Designated: 13 September 1994
- Reference no.: 684

Khingan Nature Reserve (Russian: Хинганский заповедник Khinganskiy zapavyednik) (also Khingansky) is a Russian 'zapovednik' (strict nature reserve), located in the extreme south-east of the Amur River region of the Russian Far East. The reserve covers two types of habitat: the flat Arkharinskaya lowlands with abundant wetlands, and forested spurs of the Lesser Khingan mountains. In particular, Khingan Reserve was created to protect steppe and forest-steppe landscapes, and nesting sites of the endangered Red-crowned crane (Ussuri crane) and the vulnerable White-naped crane. The reserve is situated in the Arkharinsky District of Amur Oblast.

== Topography ==
The Khingan Nature reserve is divided into two separate sections, one on the Amur-Zeya-Bureya intermountain plains (about 70% of the area), and one in the low rugged hills of the left bank of the Amur River (70% of the area). The lowlands are Quaternary lakes and rivers of alluvial and sedimentary rocks. The mountain section averages 200–400 meters in height, with the highest point (Mount Erakticha) being 504 meters in altitude.

== Climate and ecoregion ==
Khingan is located in the Amur meadow steppe ecoregion. This is a low-lying fertile floodplain, with patches of deciduous subtaiga forests. Situated in the middle Amur River in the Russian Far East, and northeast China, trees are generally found only in the upland areas, due to the frequent flooding of the plains. Species endemism is low, in part because the area was not glaciated in the latest Ice Age.

The climate of Khingan is Humid Continental Climate (Köppen climate classification (Dwb)). High variation in temperature, both daily and seasonally; with dry winters and cool summers. January has an average temperature -27 C. July averages +21 C.

== Flora and fauna ==
The vegetation and animals of the Khingan Reserve is marked by the interpenetration of different floristic groups, with a wide variety of growing conditions and microclimate, in the intersection of plains grassland, wetlands (including sphagnum bogs), and larch and cedar-broad-leaf forest habitats. The plains section of the reserve exhibit Far Eastern forest-steppe type terrain, typically sedge, reed grass, and mixed grass meadows interspersed with islands of birch forest. The mountainous section exhibits Far East broad-leaf forest terrain.

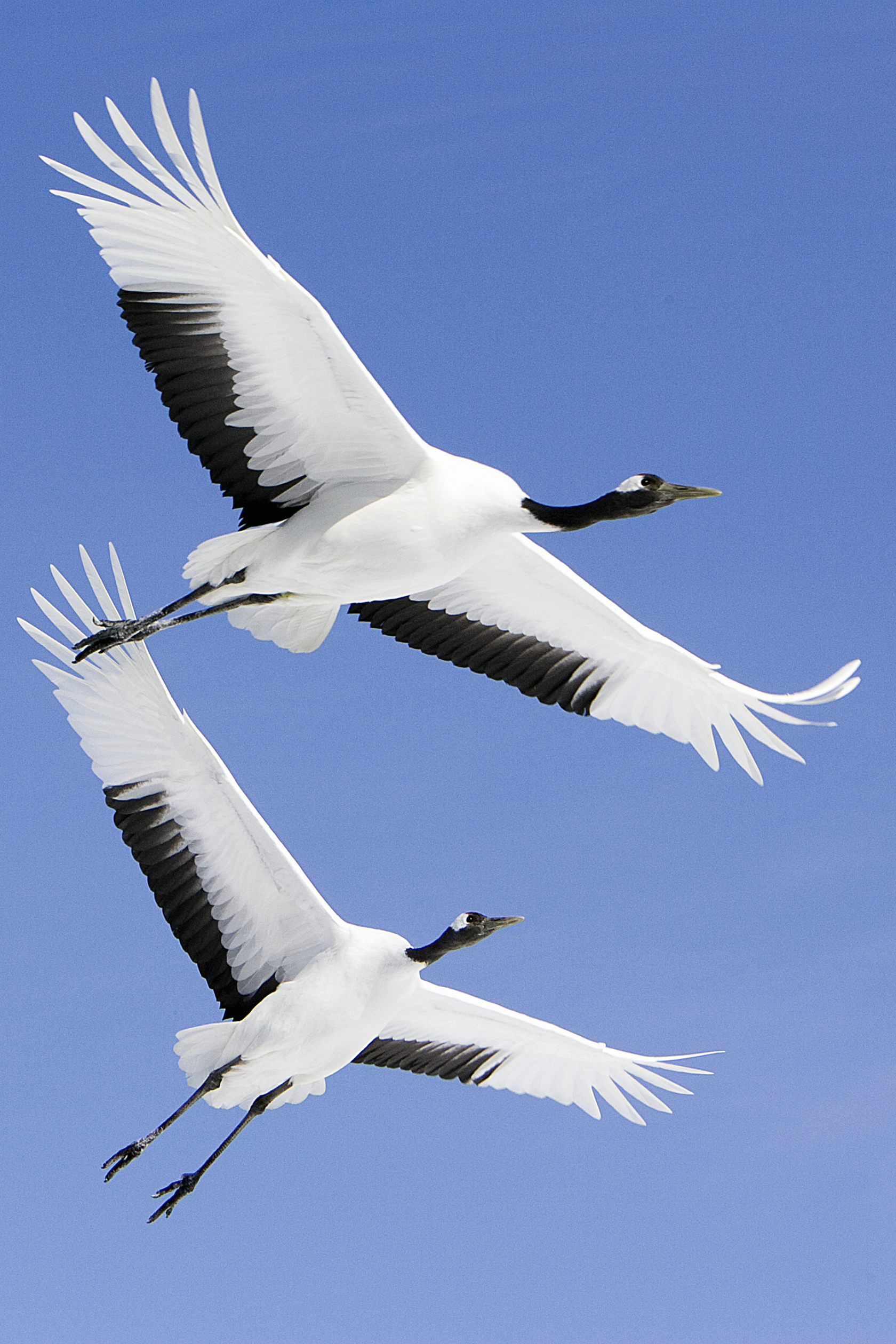
Red-crowned cranes flying

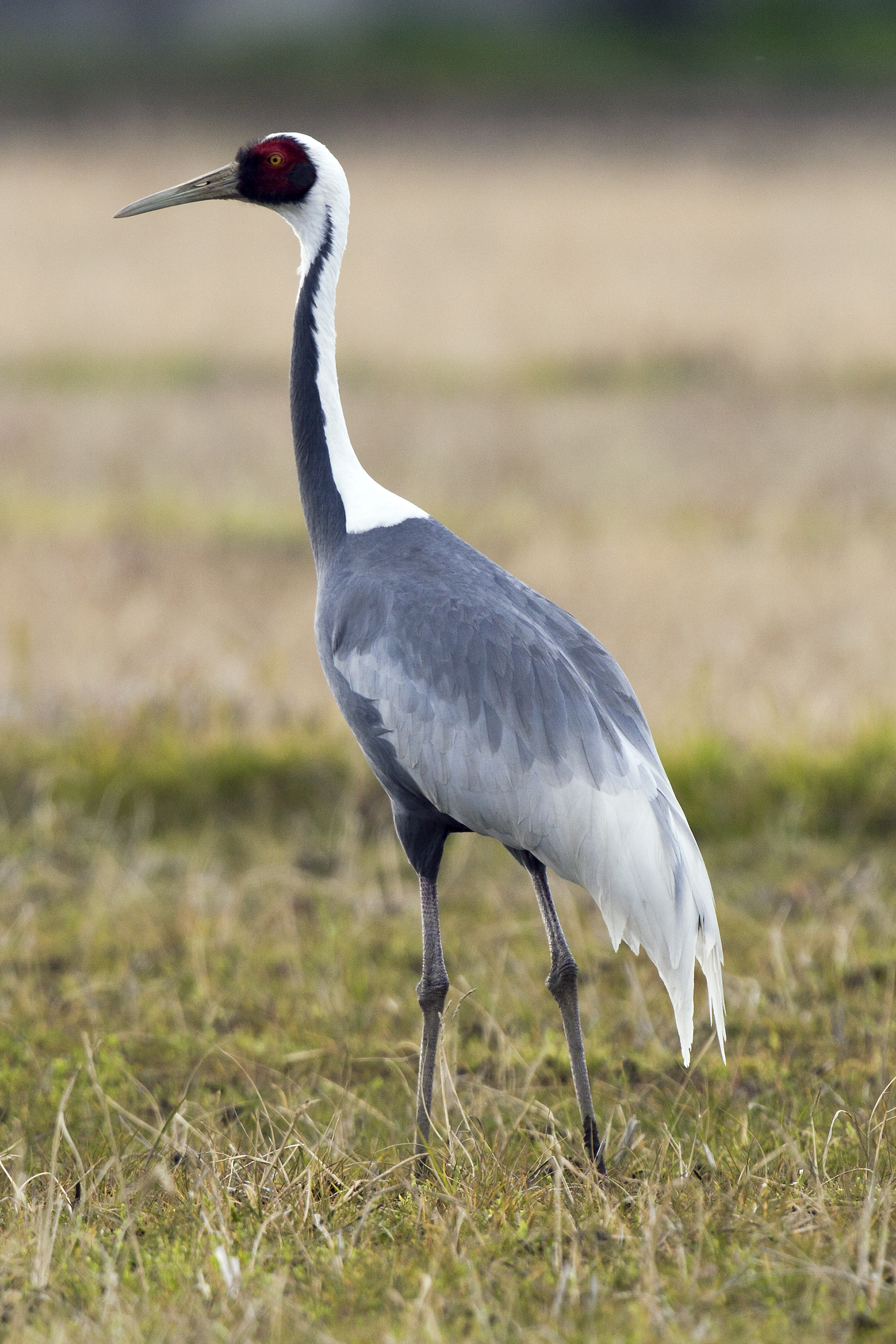
White-naped crane

Animals in the reserve are a mixture of the typical residents of both East Siberian forests and the Manchurian region: large ungulates (roe deer, wapiti, wild boar) and forest dwellers (chipmunk, squirrel, wolf, fox, brown bear, sable, elk). Over 290 species of birds have been recorded, both waterfowl for the wetland habitats and predators of the forests. The most common fish in the lakes are carp, minnow and loach, in the rivers the most common fish are grayling.

== Ecotourism ==
As a strict nature reserve, the reserve is mostly closed to the general public, although scientists and those with 'environmental education' purposes can make arrangements with park management for visits. There are 'ecotourist' routes, such as to 'White Bird Lake', however, that are open to the public, but arrangements must be made at the main office. Reserve staff give guided tours to the lakes to see the flowering of the Kormorov Lotus from mid-July to mid-August. Tour groups are welcome by arrangement and over a thousand visitors are received each year. There are rustic accommodations available in some of the buffer areas.

The reserve currently runs a volunteer program for groups willing to help with conservation activities in the field. The main office, which also has a small nature museum and wildlife nursery open to the public, is in the town of Arkhara.

== See also ==
- List of Russian Nature Reserves (class 1a 'zapovedniks')
