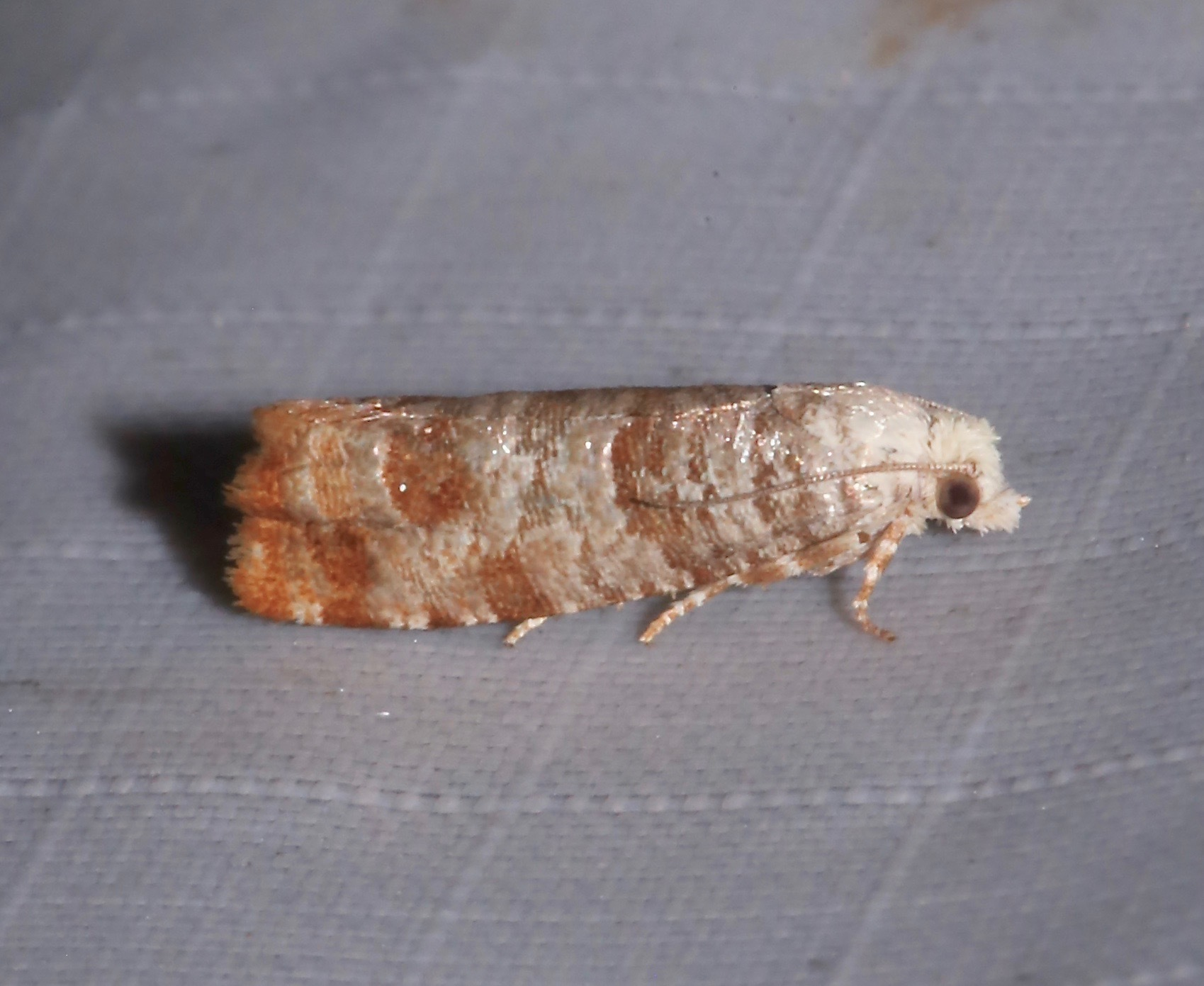

Scientific classification
- Domain: Eukaryota
- Kingdom: Animalia
- Phylum: Arthropoda
- Class: Insecta
- Order: Lepidoptera
- Family: Tortricidae
- Genus: Retinia
- Species: R. comstockiana

Binomial name
- Retinia comstockiana Fernald, 1879

Synonyms
- Petrova comstockiana

= Retinia comstockiana =

Species of moth

Retinia comstockiana, the pitch twig moth or Comstock's retinia moth, is a species of moth of the family Tortricidae. It is found in the United States, including Massachusetts, New York and Pennsylvania.

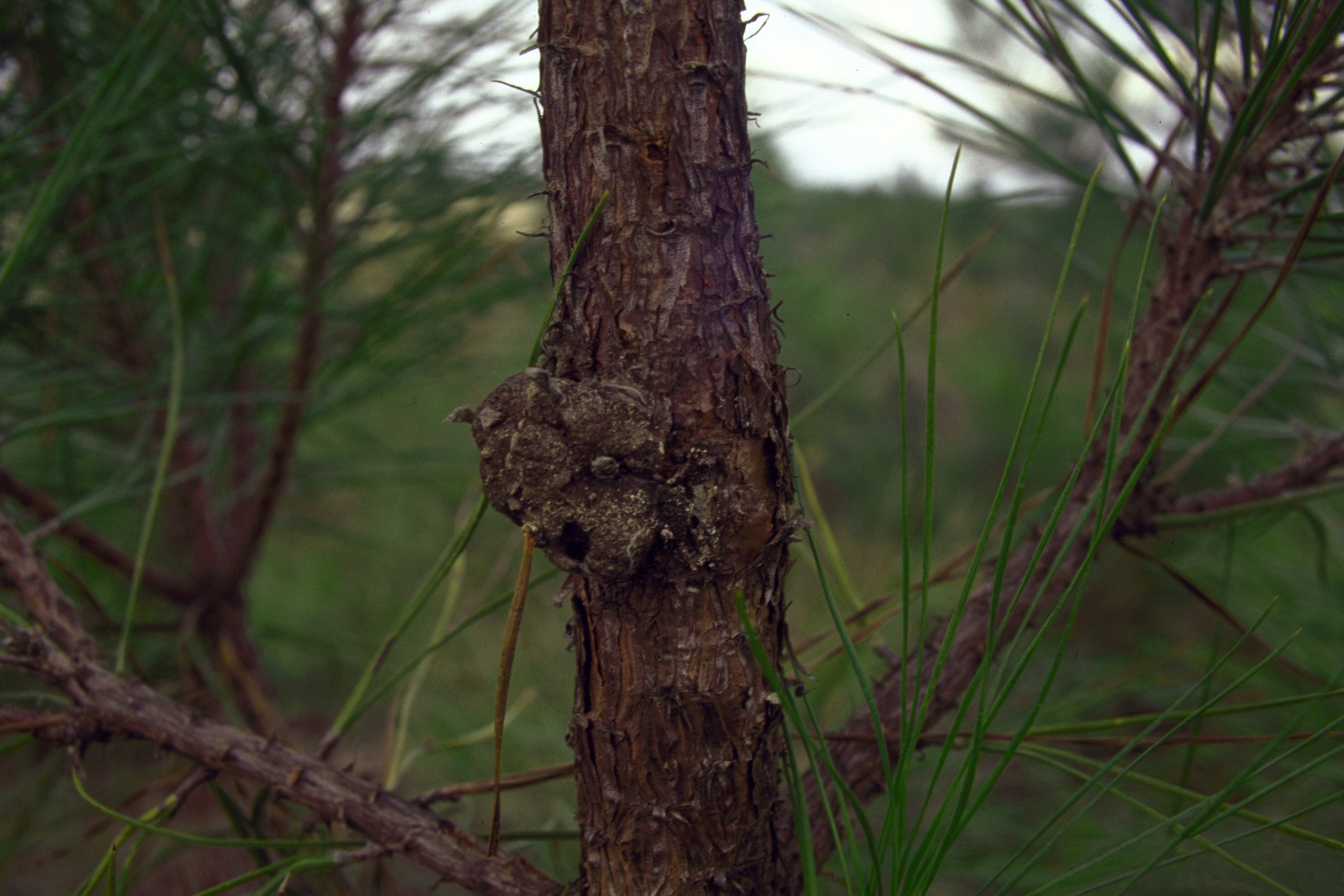
Damage

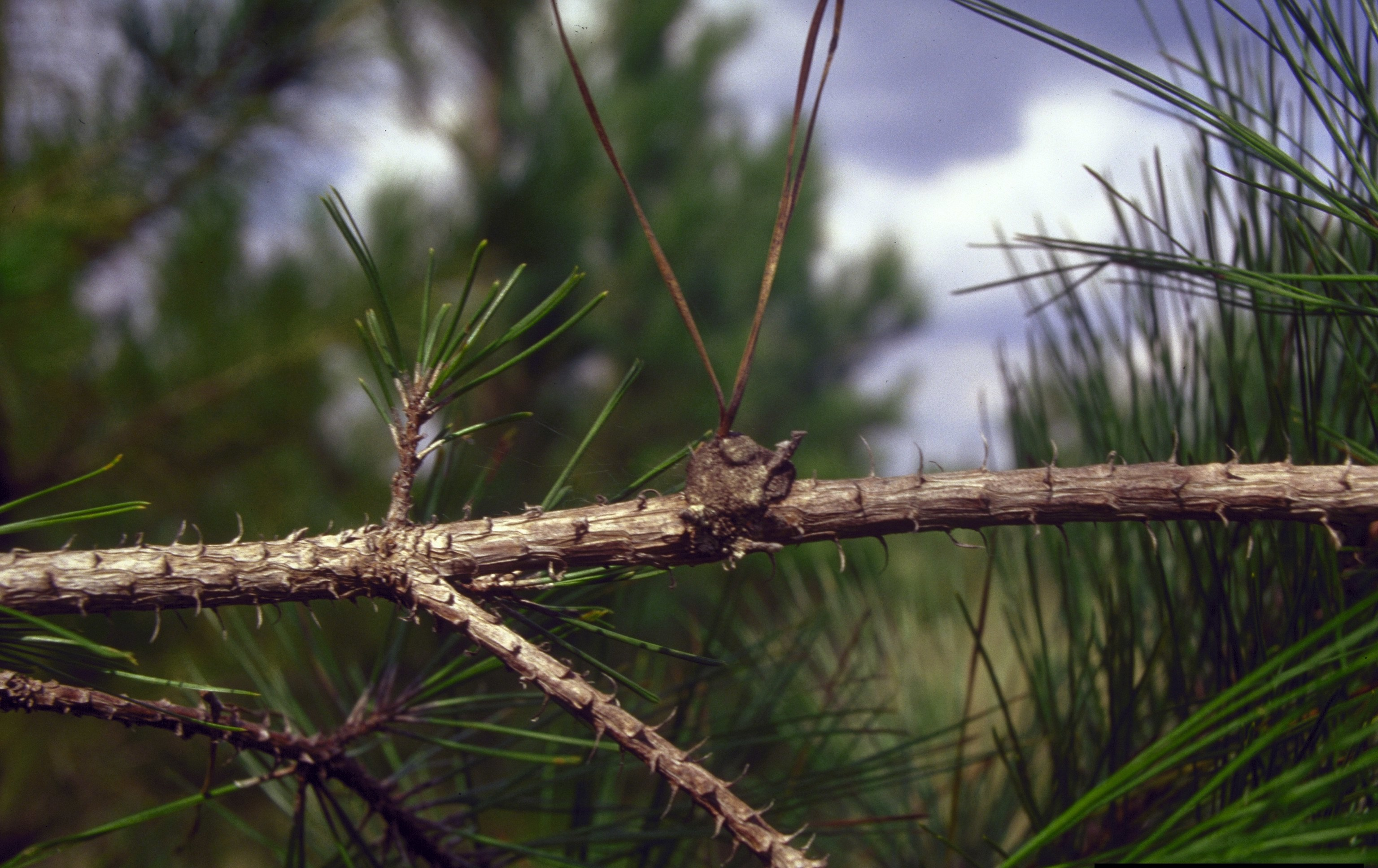
Damage

The larvae feed on Pinus rigida. They bore into the twigs of their host plant.
