= Northeast China Plain deciduous forests =

Ecoregion in Northeast China

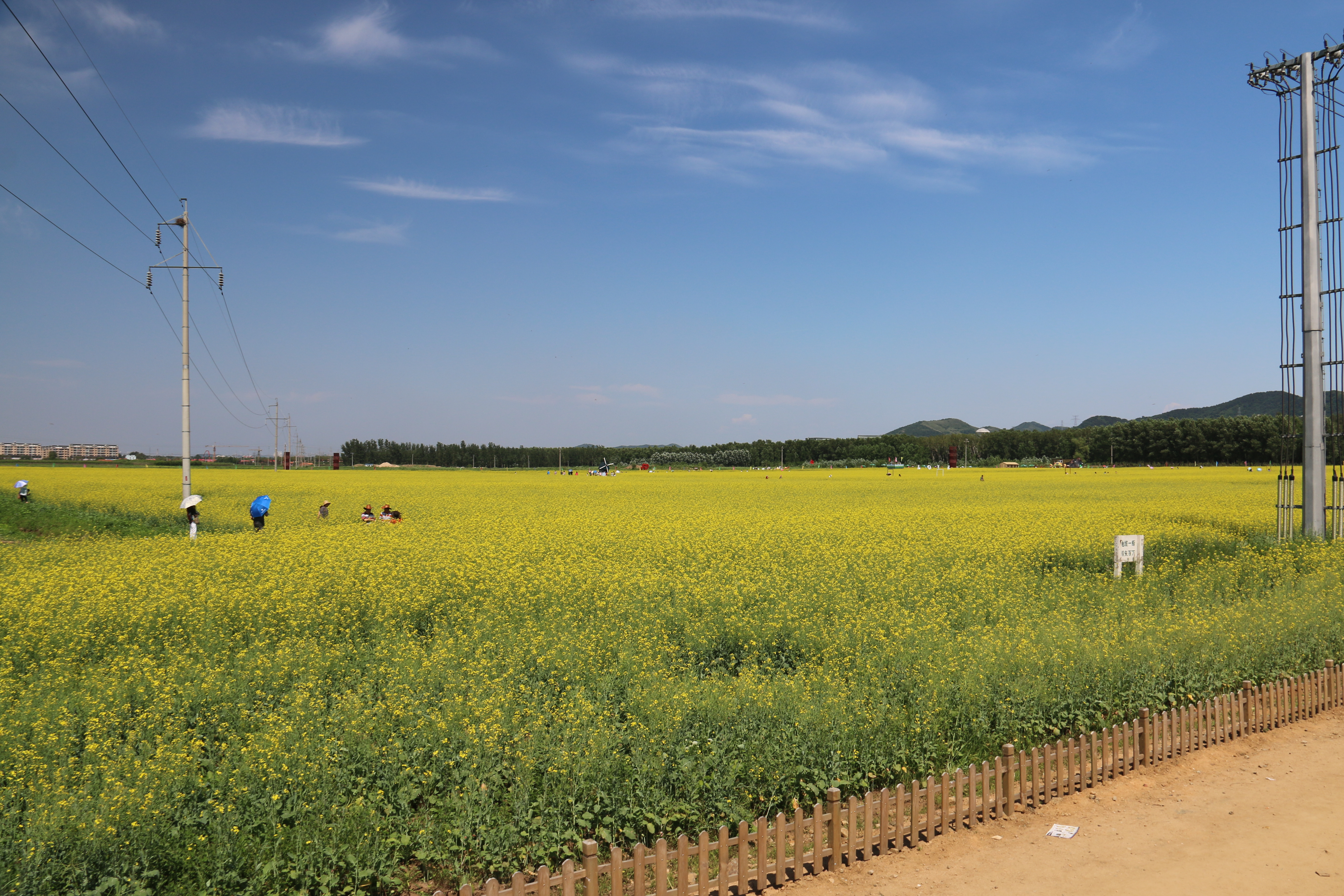
- Flower Sea Scenic Spot in Fanhe, Tieling

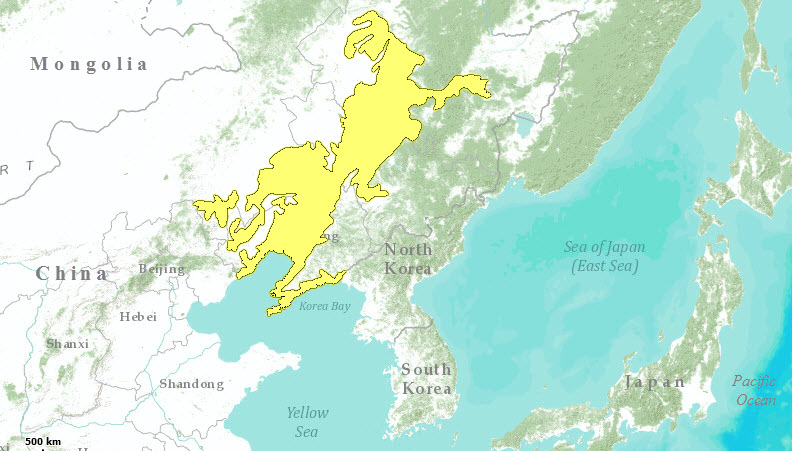
- Ecoregion territory (in yellow)

Ecology
- Realm: Palearctic
- Biome: Temperate broadleaf and mixed forest

Geography
- Area: 232,500 km^{2} (89,800 sq mi)
- Countries: China; North Korea
- Coordinates: 43°25′N 124°25′E

The Northeast China Plain deciduous forests ecoregion (WWF ID: PA0430) covers the flat interior Northeast China Plain and neighboring adjacent northwestern North Korea, in the region historically known as Manchuria. The plain is surrounded by mountains on the north and east, and supports some of China's largest forest tracts. There are also extensive low-lying wetlands, which support important bird populations.

== Location and description ==
The Northeast China Plain is the largest single plain in China, bordered by the Changbai Mountains on the border with North Korea to the east, and the Greater Khingan and Lesser Khingan mountains to the north. The southern half of the region is the watershed of the Liao River, which runs south into the Bohai Sea.

== Climate ==
The climate of the ecoregion is Humid continental climate, hot summer (Köppen climate classification (Dwa)), with a dry winter. This climate is characterized by large seasonal temperature differentials and a hot summer (at least one month averaging over 22 °C (72 °F)), and cold winters having monthly precipitation less than one-tenth of the wettest summer month.

== Flora and fauna ==
The plain hosts extensive broadleaf deciduous forests, which trend into conifer forests on the northern edge. Oaks are most common in the southern half of the region, accompanied by maple, elm and ash. Farther north, forests are characterized by Mongolian oak (Quercus mongolica) and Daurian birch (Betula dahurica). In drier areas, stands of sawtooth oak, (Quercus acutissima), dominate. Throughout, the plain is heavily converted to agriculture, taking advantage of the climate and the fertile chernozem soils.

The floodplain at the mouth of the Liao River is a large wetland that supports waterfowl, including the endangered Manchurian crane (Red-crowned crane).

== See also ==
- Ecoregions in China
