= Bolshekhekhtsirsky Nature Reserve =

Nature reserve in Khabarovsk Krai, Russia

- Russian: Большехехцирский заповедник
- IUCN category Ia (strict nature reserve)
- Big Khekhtsir Ridge, surrounded by floodplains

- Location within Russia
- Location: Khabarovsk Krai
- Nearest city: Khabarovsk
- Coordinates: 48°12′18″N 134°51′32″E
- Area: 45,439 hectares (112,282 acres; 175 sq mi)
- Established: 1963
- Governing body: Ministry of Natural Resources and Environment (Russia)
- Website: http://xn----7sbeckflmcalhd0bfgii4cr9h.xn--p1ai/

Bolshekhekhtsirsky Nature Reserve (Russian: Большехехцирский заповедник) (Big Khekhtsir) is a Russian 'zapovednik' (strict ecological reserve) covering and named for the Big Khekhtsir Ridge, about 20 km south of the city of Khabarovsk, in the Russian Far East. The area is noteworthy for its position - close to a city and relatively open to public hikers on certain trails - and for being an island of mountain-forest biodiversity surrounded by lower river floodplains. The reserve is situated in the Khabarovsk Krai. The reserve was created in 1963, and covers an area of 45,439 ha (175.44 sq mi).

== Topography ==
The Khetskir Ridge is an "island ridge" covered in coniferous forest, surrounded on all sides by low flatlands of the Amur River, which runs west-to-east to the north of the ridge, the lower reaches of the Ussuri River, which runs to the west of the reserve before meeting the Amur, and the Cirka River, which wraps around the ridge on its east, south and west sides. About 20 km of the reserve's western border faces China across the Ussuri River.

The ridge itself runs west-to-east for about 30 km, with an average height of 600–800 meters, and a peak height of 950 meters. The ridge is surrounded by medium height spurs of granite and gneiss foothills, reaching down to flat meadows and floodplains around the entire reserve.

== Climate and ecoregion ==
Bolshekhekhtsi is located in the Amur meadow steppe ecoregion. For the most part, this ecoregion is a low-lying fertile floodplain, with patches of deciduous subtaiga forests; the Khekhtsir Ridge rises about the characteristic terrain, producing many transition habitats that support high levels of biodiversity. Trees in Khekhetsirsky are generally protected from the frequent flooding of the plains.

The climate of Bolshekhekhtsi is Humid continental climate, cool summer (Köppen climate classification (Dfb)). This climate is characterized by large swings in temperature, both diurnally and seasonally, with mild summers and cold, snowy winters. In the middle altitudes of the Khekhtsirsky Ridge, the average frost-free growing period is about 150 days, which drops to a growing period of 90 days in the highest altitudes. Average annual precipitation at the middle elevations is 600–700 mm.

== Flora, fauna, and funga ==
91% of the reserve is forested. At the highest elevations, the main trees are fir and spruce. The middle altitudes are mixed deciduous forest stands with some aspen and oak. The floodplains are dominated larch, reeds, and sedge meadows. The terraces feature aspen groves and oak forests. The animals are those typical of the Sino-Himalayan and Siberian taiga. The main focus of scientific study on the reserve is seeking to understand the dynamics of plaint and animal communities in an isolated forest of the Amur River floodplains. Biodiversity is very high: scientists on the reserve have recorded 1,017 species of vascular plants, 826 species of mushrooms, 293 of algae, 152 of lichen, and 211 species of moss.

== Ecotourism ==
The Reserve sponsors a nature museum for the public, and supports public use of a limited number of nature trails in small guided tours. The main public "ecological trail" is a 1-hour guided hike through the forest along the confluence of the Ussuri and the Amur. There are also guest facilities and a picnic area. On the eastern border (just outside the reserve) there is a public ski area. But the reserve's public areas are very limited. Most of the reserve is a strict nature reserve, and closed to the public. Scientists and those with 'environmental education' purposes can make arrangements with park management for research visits. The main office is in the City of Khabarovsk.

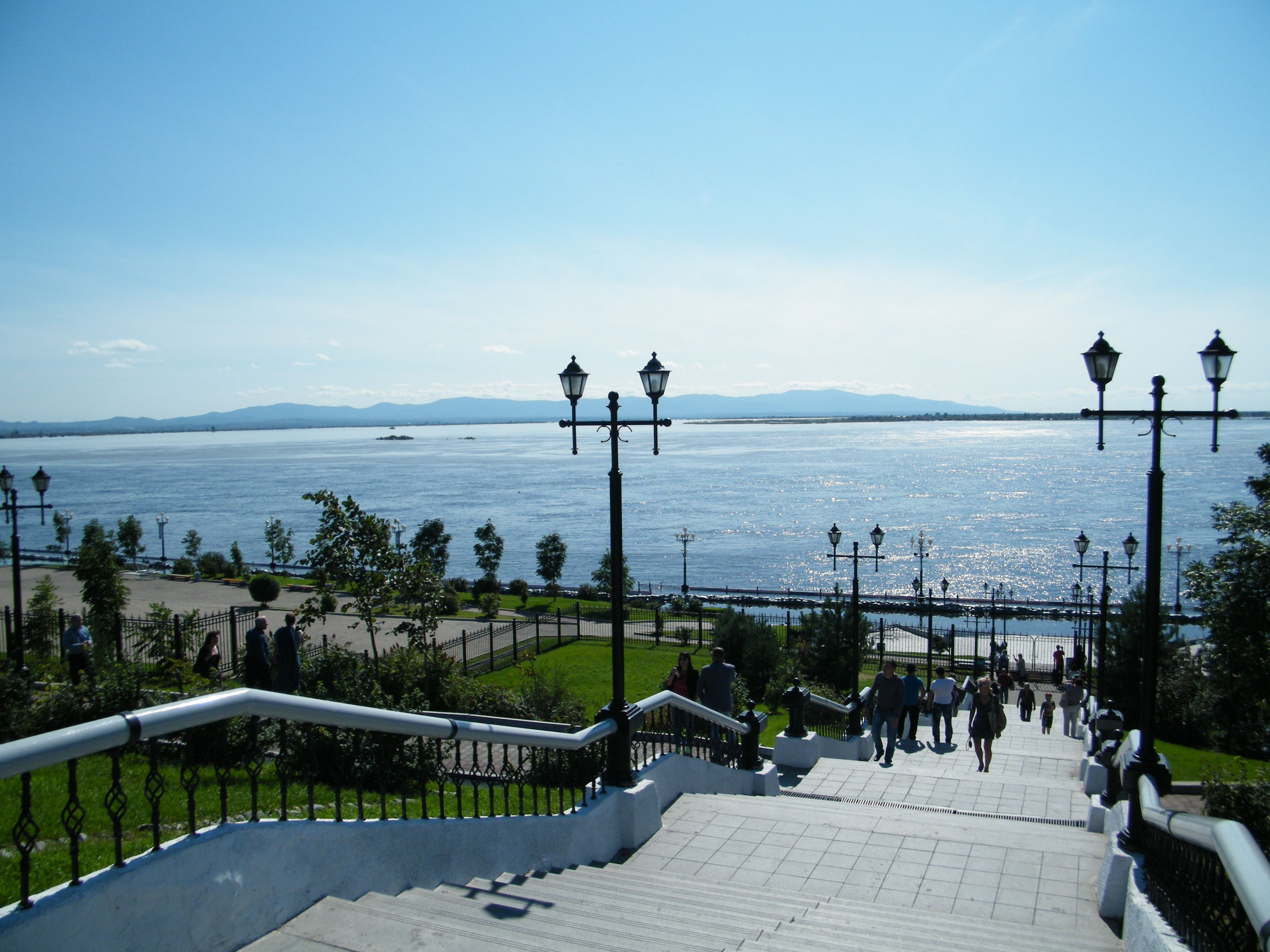
View of Big Khekhtsir Ridge, from the City of Khabarovsk, across the Amur River

== See also ==
- List of Russian Nature Reserves (class 1a 'zapovedniks')
- National parks of Russia
- Protected areas of Russia
