= Retinia teleopa =

Scientific classification
- Kingdom: Animalia
- Phylum: Arthropoda
- Class: Insecta
- Order: Lepidoptera
- Family: Tortricidae
- Genus: Retinia
- Species: R. teleopa

Binomial name
- Retinia teleopa (Meyrick, 1927)

Synonyms
- Evetria teleopa Meyrick, 1927

Species of moth

Retinia teleopa is a species of moth of the family Tortricidae. It is found in China (Shanghai, Shaanxi).
