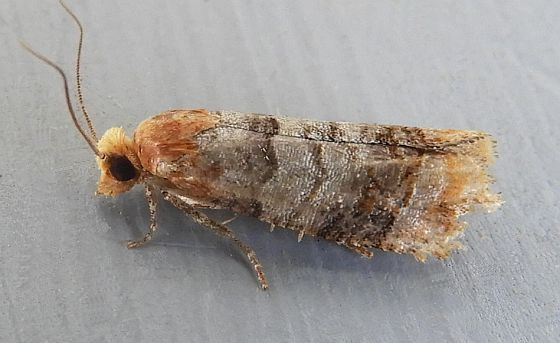
- Retinia edemoidana

Scientific classification
- Domain: Eukaryota
- Kingdom: Animalia
- Phylum: Arthropoda
- Class: Insecta
- Order: Lepidoptera
- Family: Tortricidae
- Subfamily: Olethreutinae
- Tribe: Eucosmini
- Genus: Retinia; Guenée, 1845

Synonyms
- Petrova Heinrich, 1923

= Retinia =

Genus of tortrix moths

Retinia is a genus of moths belonging to the subfamily Olethreutinae of the family Tortricidae.

== Species ==
- Retinia albicapitana (Busck, 1914)
- Retinia arizonensis (Heinrich, 1920)
- Retinia burkeana (Kearfott, 1907)
- Retinia coeruleostriana (Caradja, 1939)
- Retinia comstockiana Fernald, 1879
- Retinia cristata (Walsingham, 1900)
- Retinia edemoidana (Dyar, 1903)
- Retinia gemistrigulana (Kearfott, 1905)
- Retinia houseri (Miller, 1959)
- Retinia immanitana (Kuznetzov, 1969)
- Retinia impropria (Meyrick, 1932)
- Retinia jezoensis Nasu, 1991
- Retinia khasiensis (Miller, 1977)
- Retinia lemniscata (Kuznetzov, 1973)
- Retinia mafica (Miller, 1978)
- Retinia mecynopus Diakonoff, 1989
- Retinia metallica (Busck, 1914)
- Retinia monopunctata (Oku, 1968)
- Retinia pallipennis (McDunnough, 1938)
- Retinia picicolana (Dyar, 1906)
- Retinia pseudotsugaicola Liu & Wu, 2001
- Retinia resinella (Linnaeus, 1758)
- Retinia sabiniana (Kearfott, 1907)
- Retinia salweenensis (Miller, 1977)
- Retinia scalaris (Diakonoff, 1968)
- Retinia taedana (Miller, 1978)
- Retinia teleopa (Meyrick, 1927)
- Retinia virginiana (Busck, 1914)

== See also ==
- List of Tortricidae genera
