= Retinia arizonensis =

Scientific classification
- Domain: Eukaryota
- Kingdom: Animalia
- Phylum: Arthropoda
- Class: Insecta
- Order: Lepidoptera
- Family: Tortricidae
- Genus: Retinia
- Species: R. arizonensis

Binomial name
- Retinia arizonensis (Heinrich, 1920)

Synonyms
- Evetria albicapitana arizonensis Heinrich, 1920; Petrova arizonensis

Species of moth

Retinia arizonensis, the pinyon pitch nodule moth, is a species of moth of the family Tortricidae. It is found in North America.

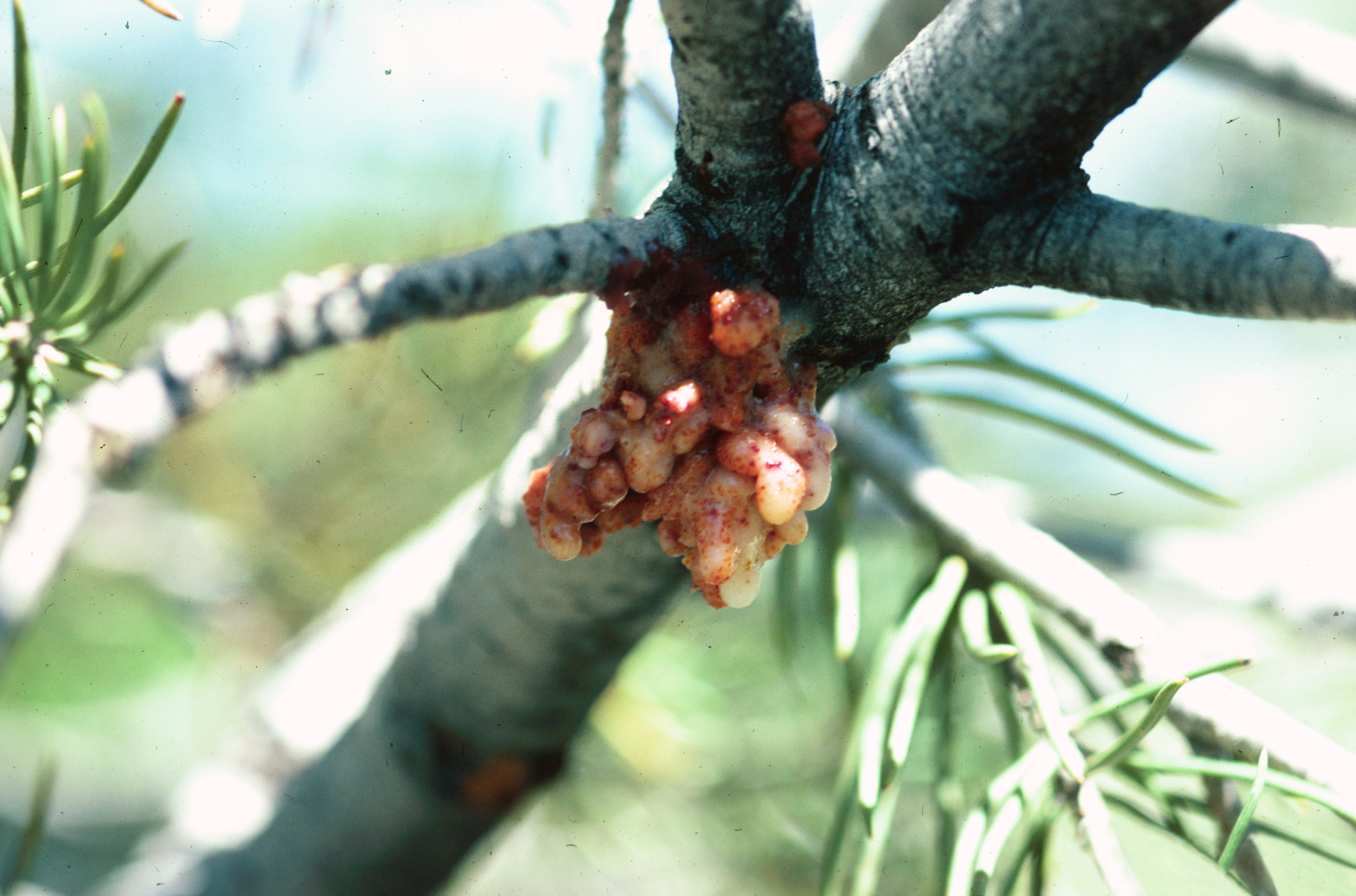
Damage

The wingspan is about 19 mm.
