= Retinia pseudotsugaicola =

Scientific classification
- Domain: Eukaryota
- Kingdom: Animalia
- Phylum: Arthropoda
- Class: Insecta
- Order: Lepidoptera
- Family: Tortricidae
- Genus: Retinia
- Species: R. pseudotsugaicola

Binomial name
- Retinia pseudotsugaicola Liu & Wu, 2001

Species of moth

Retinia pseudotsugaicola is a species of moth of the family Tortricidae. It is found in Yunnan, China.

The larvae feed on Pseudotsuga sinensis.
