= Retinia coeruleostriana =

Scientific classification
- Domain: Eukaryota
- Kingdom: Animalia
- Phylum: Arthropoda
- Class: Insecta
- Order: Lepidoptera
- Family: Tortricidae
- Genus: Retinia
- Species: R. coeruleostriana

Binomial name
- Retinia coeruleostriana (Caradja, 1939)

Synonyms
- Eucosma coeruleostriana Caradja, 1939; Petrova coeruleostiana Kuznetzov, 1976; Petrova gemmeata Kuznetsov, 1970; Petrova splendida Oku & Satoh, 1971

Species of moth

Retinia coeruleostriana is a species of moth of the family Tortricidae. It is found in China (Beijing, Hebei, Shanxi, Fujian, Henan, Sichuan, Yunnan, Shaanxi, Gansu), Japan and Russia.

The wingspan is about 15 mm.

The larvae feed on Pinus densiflora.
