= Amur meadow steppe =

Ecoregion in the Amur river basin

- Bolshekhekhtsirsky Nature Reserve, in Khabarovsk Krai, Russia

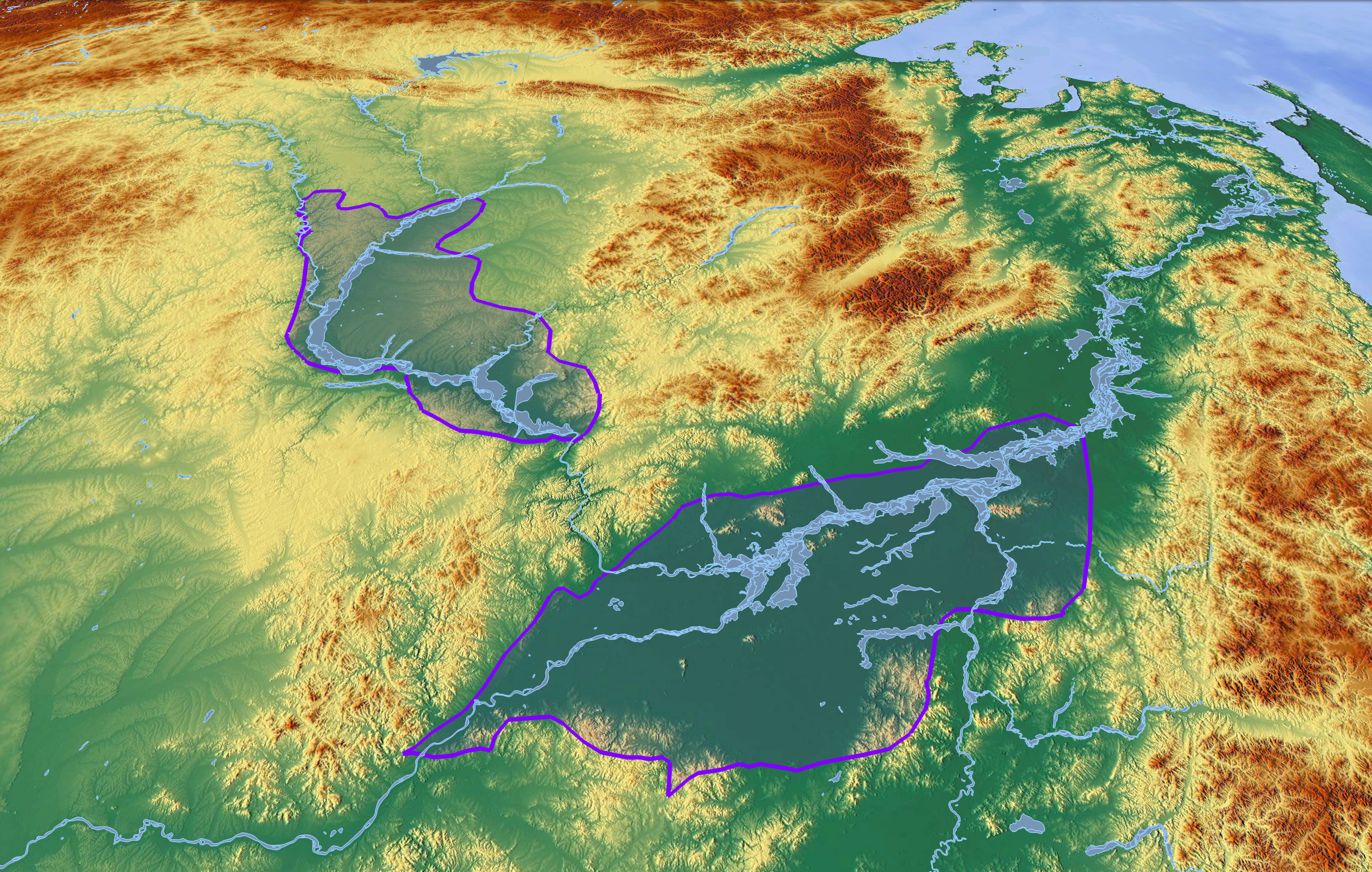
- Ecoregion territory (in purple)

Ecology
- Realm: Palearctic
- Biome: Flooded grasslands and savannas

Geography
- Area: 123,282 km^{2} (47,599 mi^{2})
- Countries: China; Russia
- Coordinates: 48.75°N 131.25°E

The Amur meadow steppe ecoregion (WWF ID: PA0901) is spread over two sections of the middle Amur River valley in the Russian Far East. The terrain is one of flat floodplains on alluvial soil. Due to high water table and frequent flooding, the area has remained relatively forest-free, and is today characterized by extensive wetlands of bogs and grasslands. The area remained ice-free during the Pleistocene glaciation, creating a refuge for many plant and animal species. It has an area of 123,283 square kilometres (47,600 mi^{2}).

== Location and description ==
The northern section stretches about 300 km in a northwest-to-southeast direction on the Russian side of the south-flowing Amur River. it is roughly centered on the city of Blagoveshchensk in Amur Oblast, Russia. This section is mostly surrounded by higher ground in the Manchurian mixed forests ecoregion. Separated by 150 km, the southern section is about 100 km longer, and straddles the Amur as it turns northeast between Heilongjiang province in China, and Khabarovsk Krai in Russia. Most of this section is in China. To the north and east of this section is the Ussuri broadleaf and mixed forests ecoregion, and to the south is the Suiphun-Khanka meadows and forest meadows ecoregion. The Amur has meandered and shifted over the long term, leaving flat, alluvial soils that support rich wildlife, as well as competing agriculture.

== Climate ==
The region has a Humid continental climate - cool summer subtype (Koppen classification Dwb). This climate is characterized by high variation in temperature, both daily and seasonally; with long, cold winters and short, cool summers with no averaging over 22 °C (72 °F). Mean precipitation is about 604 mm/year. The mean temperature at the center of the ecoregion is −24.9 °C (−12.8 °F) in January, and 20.3 °C (68.5 °F) in July.

== Flora and fauna ==
In the wet meadows on the lowest levels and terraces, the dominant plants are reed grasses (Calamagrostis). The extensive meadows of the ecoregion support many species of Apiaceae (umbellifers of the Parsley family) that are often tall, flowering herbs, of Spiraea, hardy deciduous-leaved shrubs of the family Rosaceae.

== Protections ==
There are two significant nationally protected areas in the ecoregion:

- Khingan Nature Reserve, in the north section, and
- Bolshekhekhtsirsky Nature Reserve in the southern section.

== See also ==
- List of ecoregions in Russia
