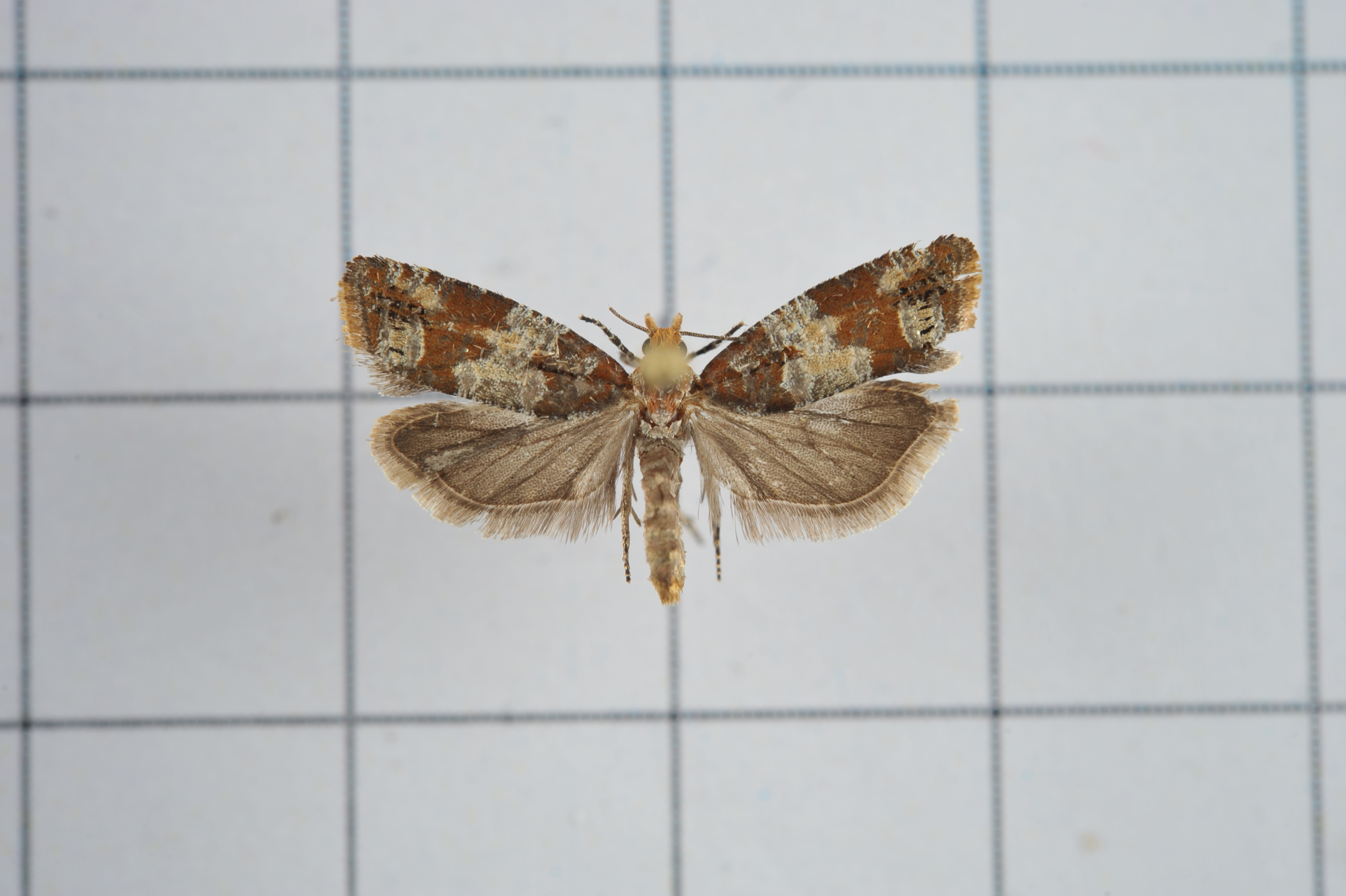

Scientific classification
- Domain: Eukaryota
- Kingdom: Animalia
- Phylum: Arthropoda
- Class: Insecta
- Order: Lepidoptera
- Family: Tortricidae
- Genus: Retinia
- Species: R. cristata

Binomial name
- Retinia cristata (Walsingham, 1900)

Synonyms
- Enarmonia cristata Walsingham, 1900; Petrova insignis Heinrich, 1928

= Retinia cristata =

Species of moth

Retinia cristata is a moth of the family Tortricidae. It is found in Japan (the islands of Hokkaido, Honshu, Shikoku, and Ryukyu), Korea, northern and central China (Beijing, Tianjin, Hebei, Shanxi, Liaoning, Heilongjiang, Jiangsu, Zhejiang, Anhui, Jiangxi, Shandong, Henan, Hubei, Hunan, Guangdong, Guangxi, Sichuan, Yunnan, Shaanxi), Taiwan and Thailand.

The wingspan is 12–17 mm. Adults are on wing from mid-May and mid-September on Honshu. On Shikoku, adults were recorded in July and early August and on Kyushu in September and October.

The larvae feed on shoots and cones of Pinus thurnbergii, Pinus densiflora and Pinus massoniana. The larvae can cause severe damage to young planted trees.
