= Munsusan (Ulsan) =

Mountain in Ulju and Ulsan, South Korea

Highest point
- Elevation: 600 m (2,000 ft)
- Coordinates: 35°32′02″N 129°12′58″E

Geography
- Location: Ulsan, South Korea

Korean name
- Hangul: 문수산
- Hanja: 文殊山
- RR: Munsusan
- MR: Munsusan

Munsusan is a mountain located in Ulju County, and Nam District, Ulsan, South Korea. It has an elevation of 600 m (1,969 ft).

== See also ==
- Geography of Korea
- List of mountains in Korea
- List of mountains by elevation
