= Munsusan (North Gyeongsang) =

Mountain in South Korea

Highest point
- Elevation: 1,205 m (3,953 ft)
- Coordinates: 36°58′59″N 128°48′36″E

Geography
- Location: North Gyeongsang Province, South Korea

Korean name
- Hangul: 문수산
- Hanja: 文水山
- RR: Munsusan
- MR: Munsusan

Munsusan (Korean: 문수산) is a mountain of North Gyeongsang Province, eastern South Korea. It has an elevation of 1,205 metres.

== See also ==
- List of mountains of Korea
