= Munsubong (Bonghwa and Taebaek) =

Mountain in South Korea

Highest point
- Elevation: 1,517 m (4,977 ft)

Geography
- Location: South Korea

Korean name
- Hangul: 문수봉
- Hanja: 文殊峰
- RR: Munsubong
- MR: Munsubong

Munsubong (Korean: 문수봉) is a South Korean mountain that sits between Taebaek, Gangwon Province and Bonghwa County, North Gyeongsang Province. It has an elevation of 1,517 m (4,977 ft).

== See also ==
- List of mountains in Korea
