= Munsubong (Jecheon and Mungyeong) =

Mountain in South Korea

Highest point
- Elevation: 1,161.5 m (3,811 ft)

Geography
- Location: South Korea

Korean name
- Hangul: 문수봉
- Hanja: 文殊峰
- RR: Munsubong
- MR: Munsubong

Munsubong (Korean: 문수봉) is a South Korean mountain that sits between the cities of Jecheon, North Chungcheong Province and Mungyeong, North Gyeongsang Province. It has an elevation of 1,161.5 m (3,811 ft).

== See also ==
- List of mountains in Korea
