= Lesser Khingan =

Mountain range in Northeastern China and the Russian Far East

- 小兴安岭 / Малый Хинган
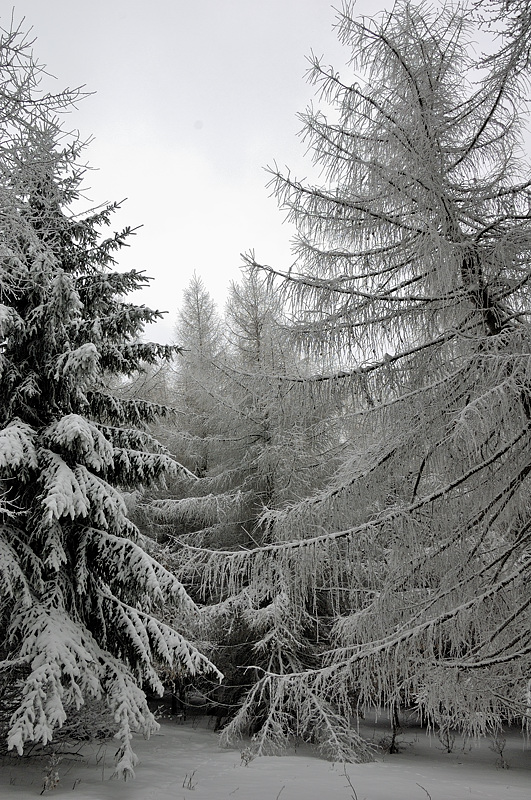
- Larch taiga on the slopes of the Lesser Khingan

Highest point
- Peak: Pingdingshan
- Elevation: 1,429 m (4,688 ft)
- Coordinates: 48°47′30″N 127°12′30″E

Dimensions
- Length: 500 km (310 mi) SW/NE
- Width: 70 km (43 mi) NW/SE

Geography
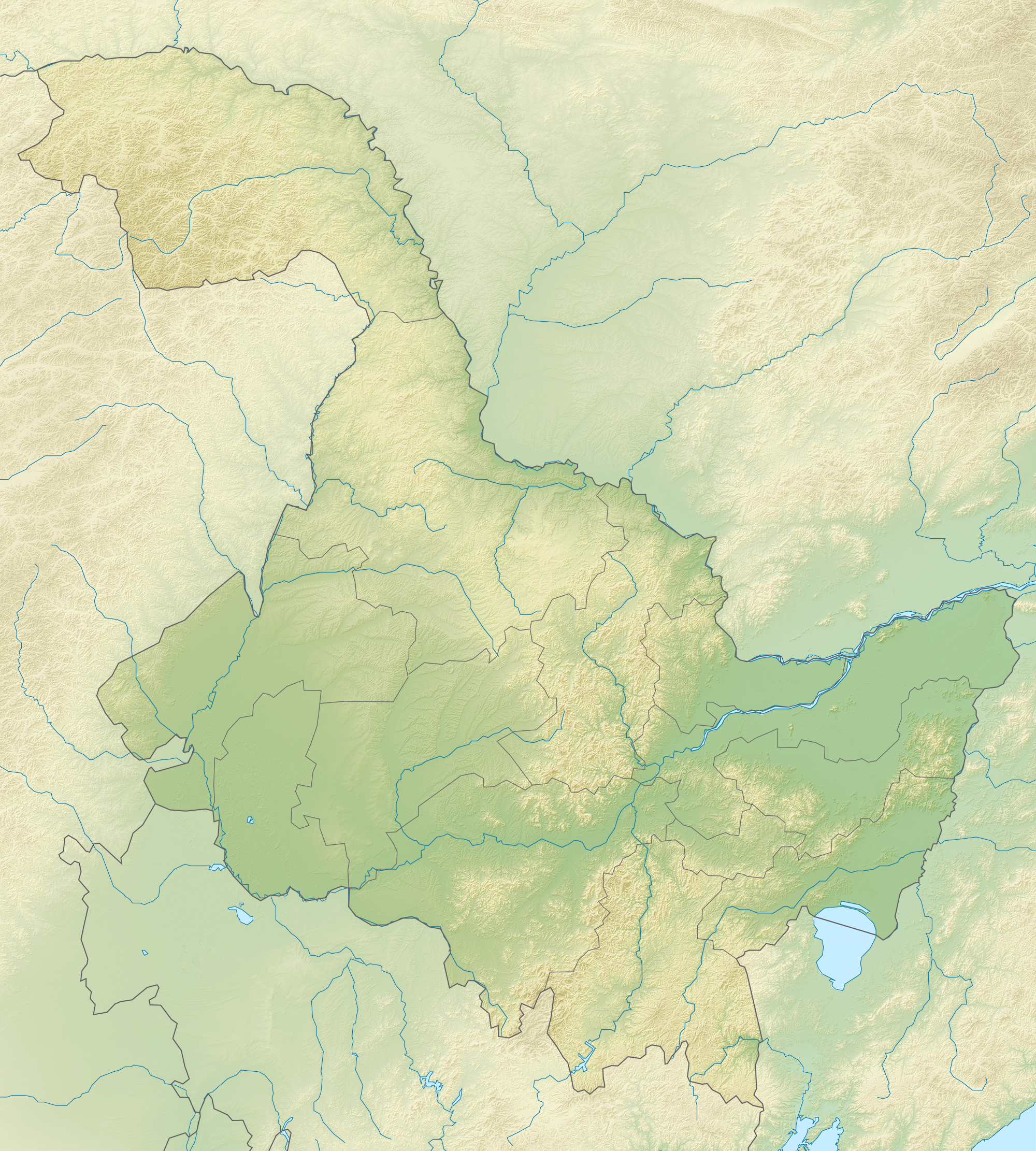
- Location within Heilongjiang
- Countries: China and Russia
- Federal subject: Heilongjiang (China); Jewish Autonomous Oblast and Amur Oblast (Russia)
- Range coordinates: 48°30′N 130°0′E

Geology
- Rock type(s): Conglomerate, basalt

Climbing
- Easiest route: From Hegang or Birobidzhan

Lesser Khingan (Chinese: 小兴安岭; pinyin: Xiǎo Xīng'ān Lǐng; Russian: Малый Хинган, Maly Khingan) is a mountain range in China's Heilongjiang province and the adjacent parts of Russia's Amur Oblast and Jewish Autonomous Oblast.

In Russia, the range is part of the Khingan Nature Reserve.

== Geography ==
In China, the Khingan mountains are divided into the Greater Khingan and Lesser Khingan. The Lesser Khingan range runs roughly from the northwest to the southeast and separates the valley of the Amur (Heilongjiang) River from that of the Nenjiang River. The mountain range then turns toward the east and north-east, entering Russia. The Amur/Heilongjiang, which is a border river, forms a gorge when crossing the mountain range.

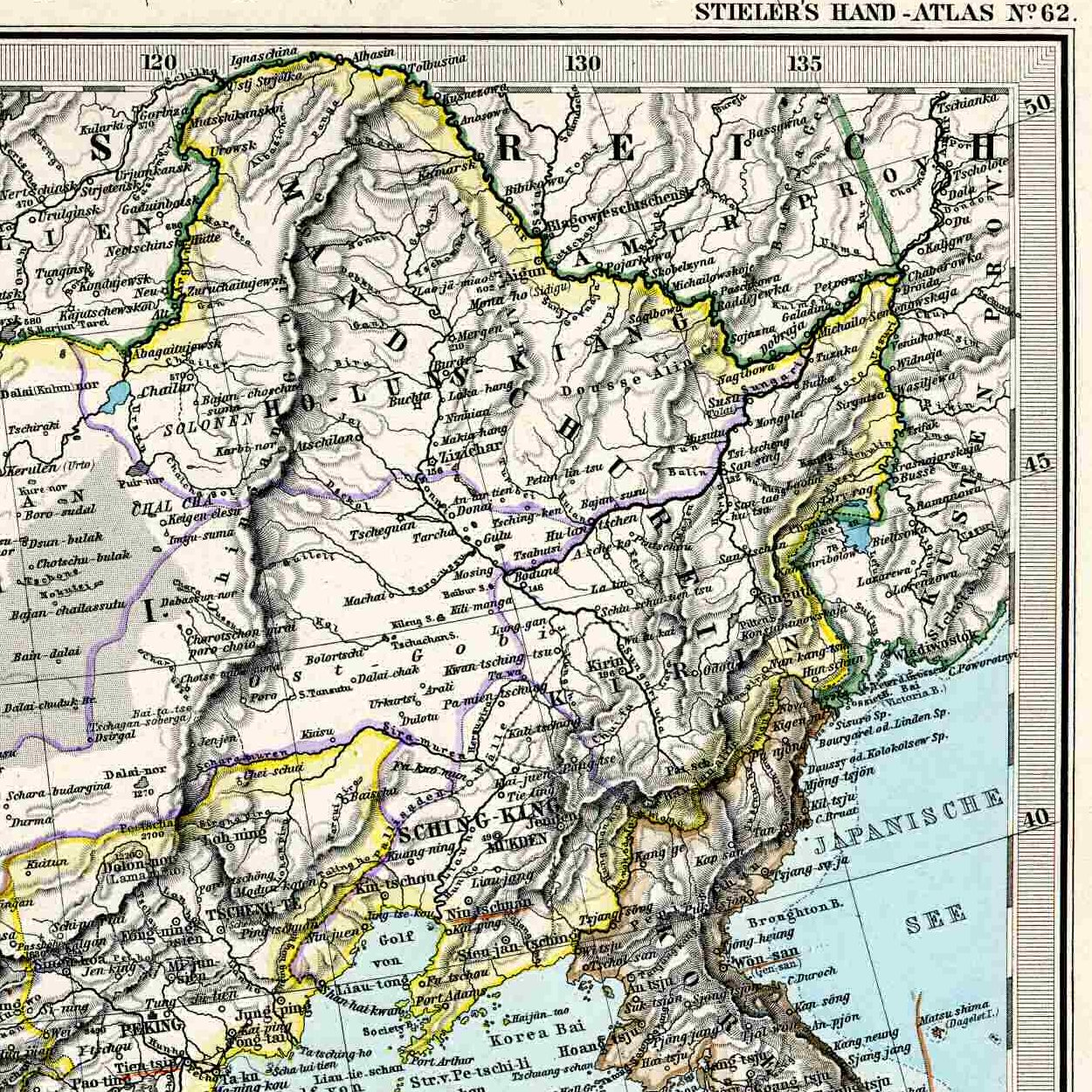
The Chinese section of the Lesser Khingan, labeled with its Manchu name (in German transcription), Iljchuri-Alin on an 1891 map

== See also ==
- Khingan Nature Reserve
- Greater Khingan
- Xing'an
