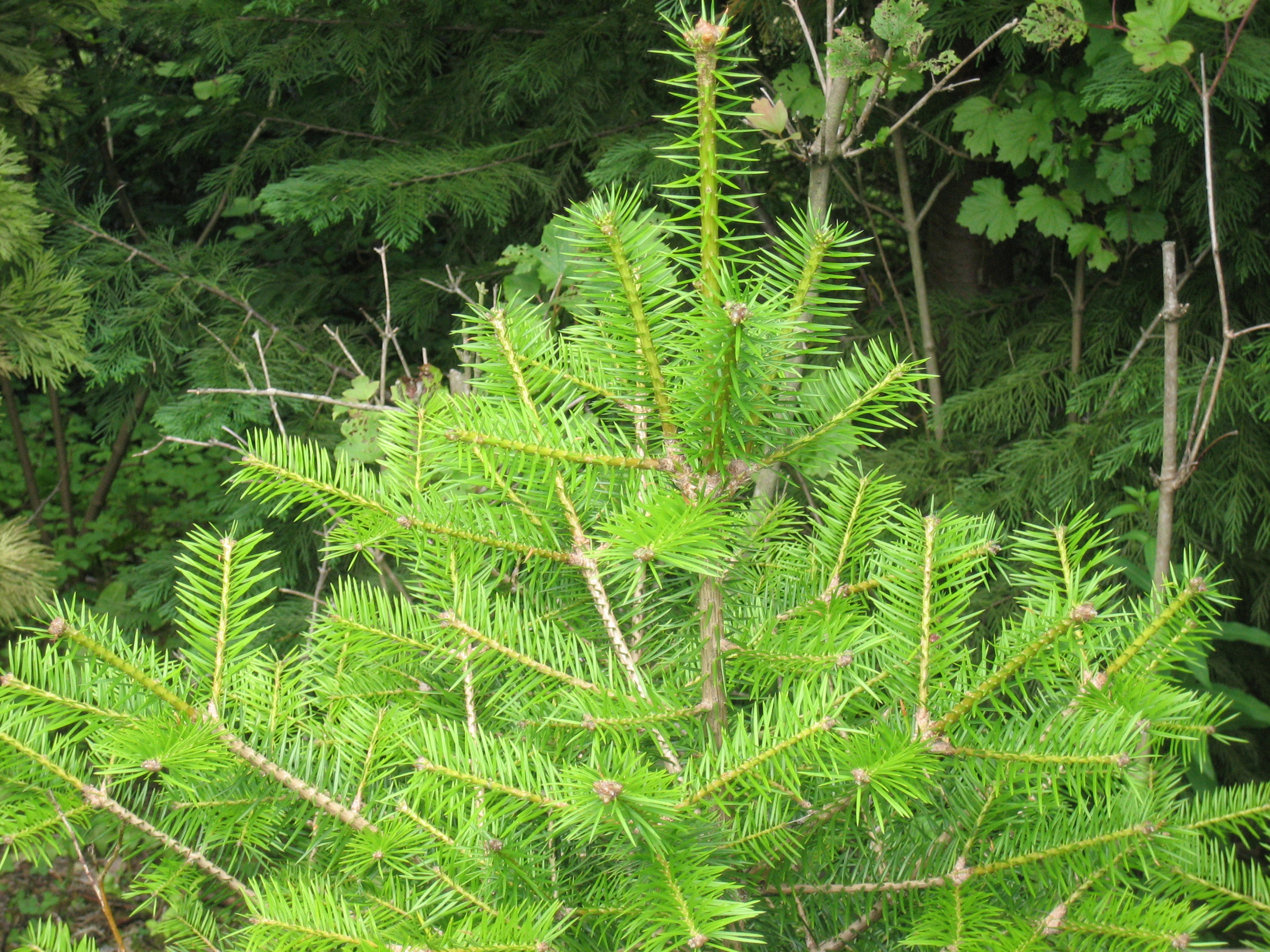
- Foliage on young tree

Conservation status
- Near Threatened (IUCN 3.1)

Scientific classification
- Kingdom: Plantae
- Clade: Embryophytes
- Clade: Tracheophytes
- Clade: Spermatophytes
- Clade: Gymnospermae
- Division: Pinophyta
- Class: Pinopsida
- Order: Pinales
- Family: Pinaceae
- Genus: Abies
- Species: A. holophylla

Binomial name
- Abies holophylla Maxim.

= Abies holophylla =

Species of conifer

Abies holophylla, also called needle fir or Manchurian fir, is a species of fir native to mountainous regions of northern Korea, southern Ussuriland, and China in the provinces of Heilongjiang, Jilin, and Liaoning.

It is an evergreen coniferous tree growing to 30 m (100 ft) tall and 1 m (3 ft) in trunk diameter with a narrowly conical crown of horizontal spreading branches. The bark is scaly and gray-brown with resin blisters. The leaves ("needles") are flattened, 2–4 cm (3/4–1 1/2 in) long and 1.5–2.5 mm (1/16–3/32 in) thick, spread at right angles from the shoot, and end in a point.

They spread on two sides, but not flat like for example in silver fir. Usually they more or less rise up forming with the shoot a V-shape empty compartment above it. Unlike in silver fir, the leaves here are sharp and prickly, without any indentation at the top.

They are bright green above and whitish-green below with 2 whitish strips, each of which is formed by 7–10 wax-covered stomatal bands. The shoots are glabrous, shiny yellow-gray when young and turning gray-brown. The cones are 12–14 cm (4 3/4–5 1/2 in) long by 4–5 cm (1 1/2–2 in) wide, yellow-brown, and slightly tapering with a bluntly rounded apex. The scale bracts are hidden under the cone scales. The seeds, 8–9 mm (5/16–3/8 in) long with a wedge-shaped wing 1.5 cm (5/8 in) long, are released after the cones disintegrate at maturity in October.

Manchurian fir is sometimes, but not commonly, used as an ornamental plant.

== Gallery ==
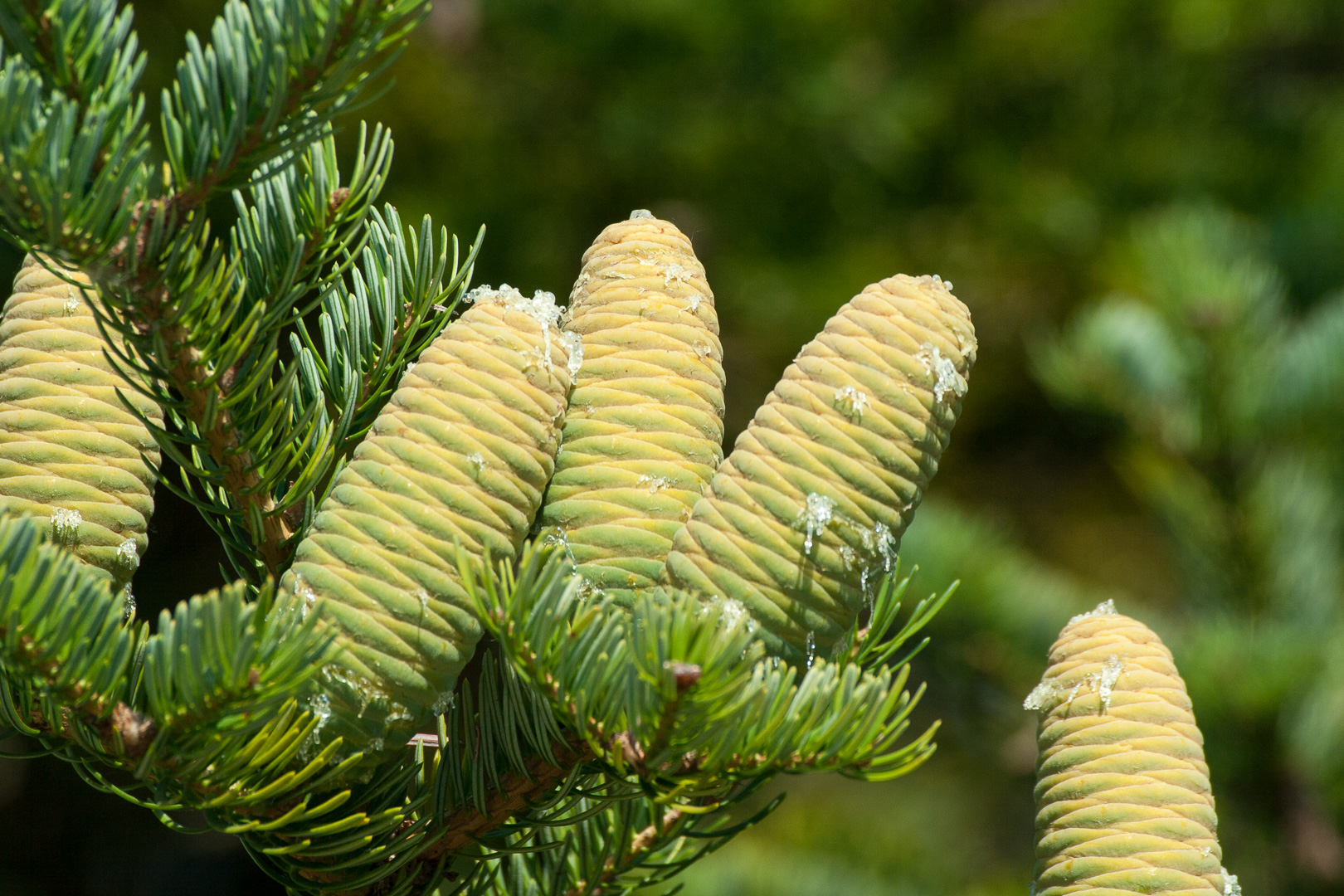
Unlike in some of other firs, unmature cones here are not purple-bluish, but green.

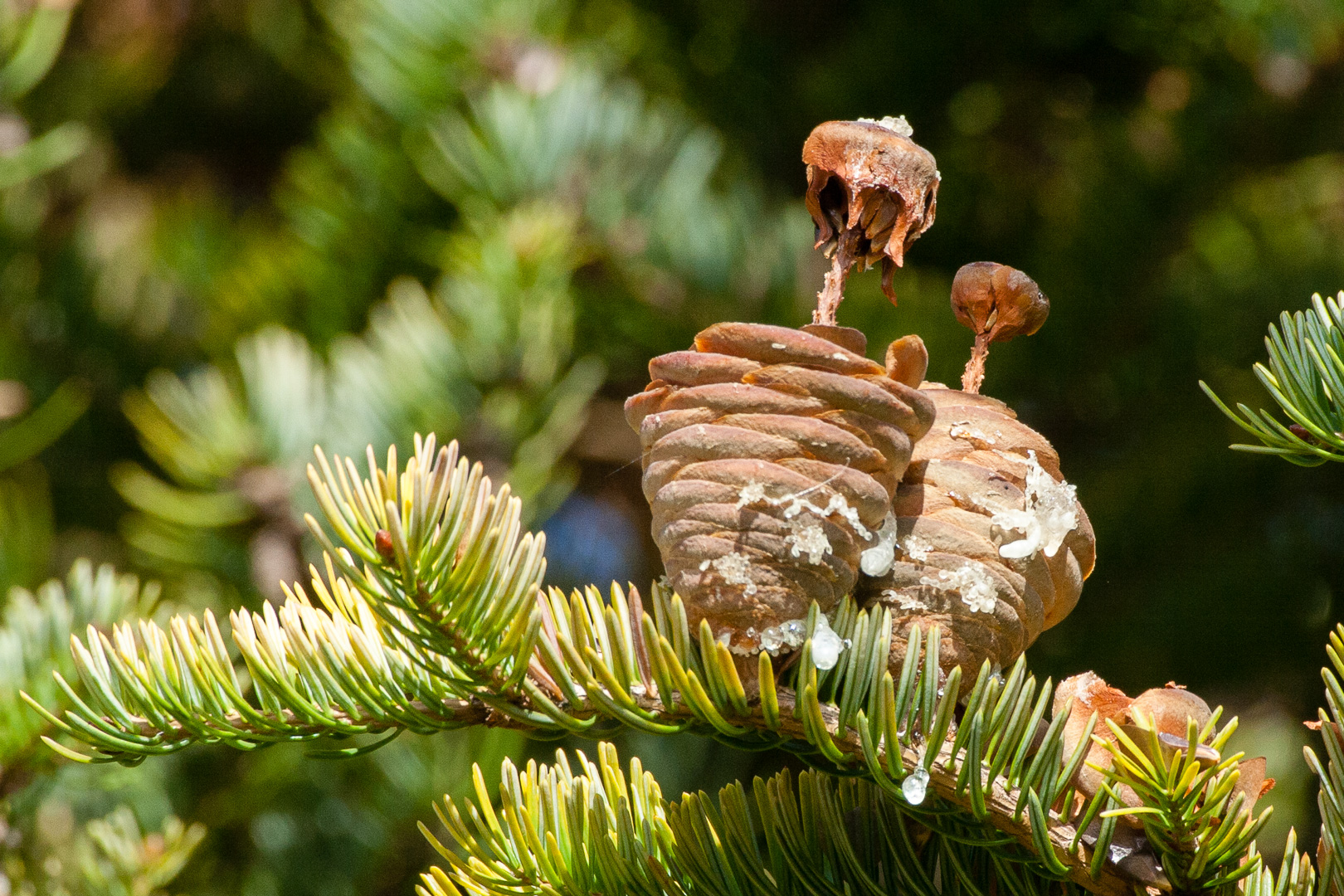
Disintegrating cones. The cones in both images are covered by resin.

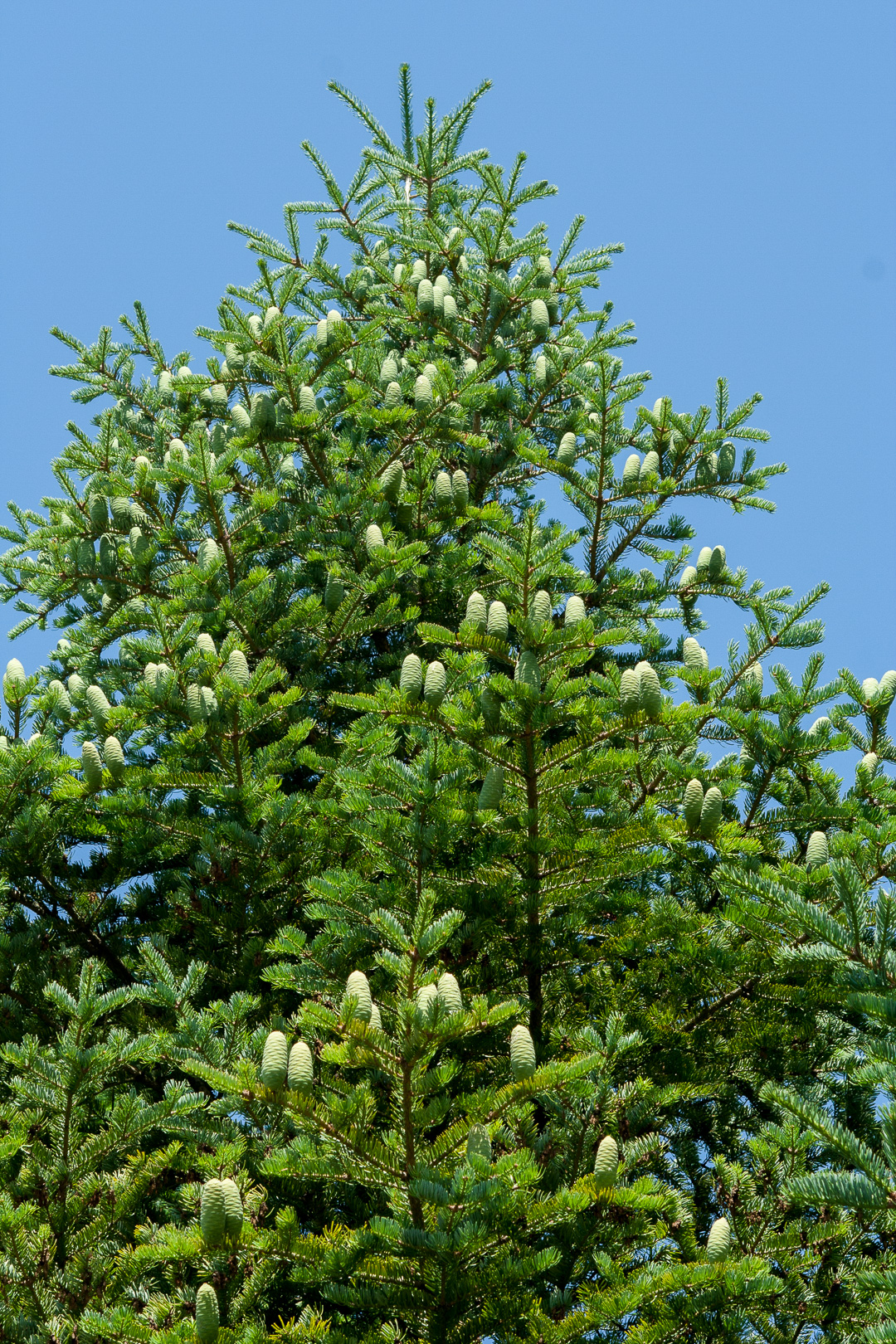
Young developing cones in early July. In contrast to spruce, even large fir cones are raised.

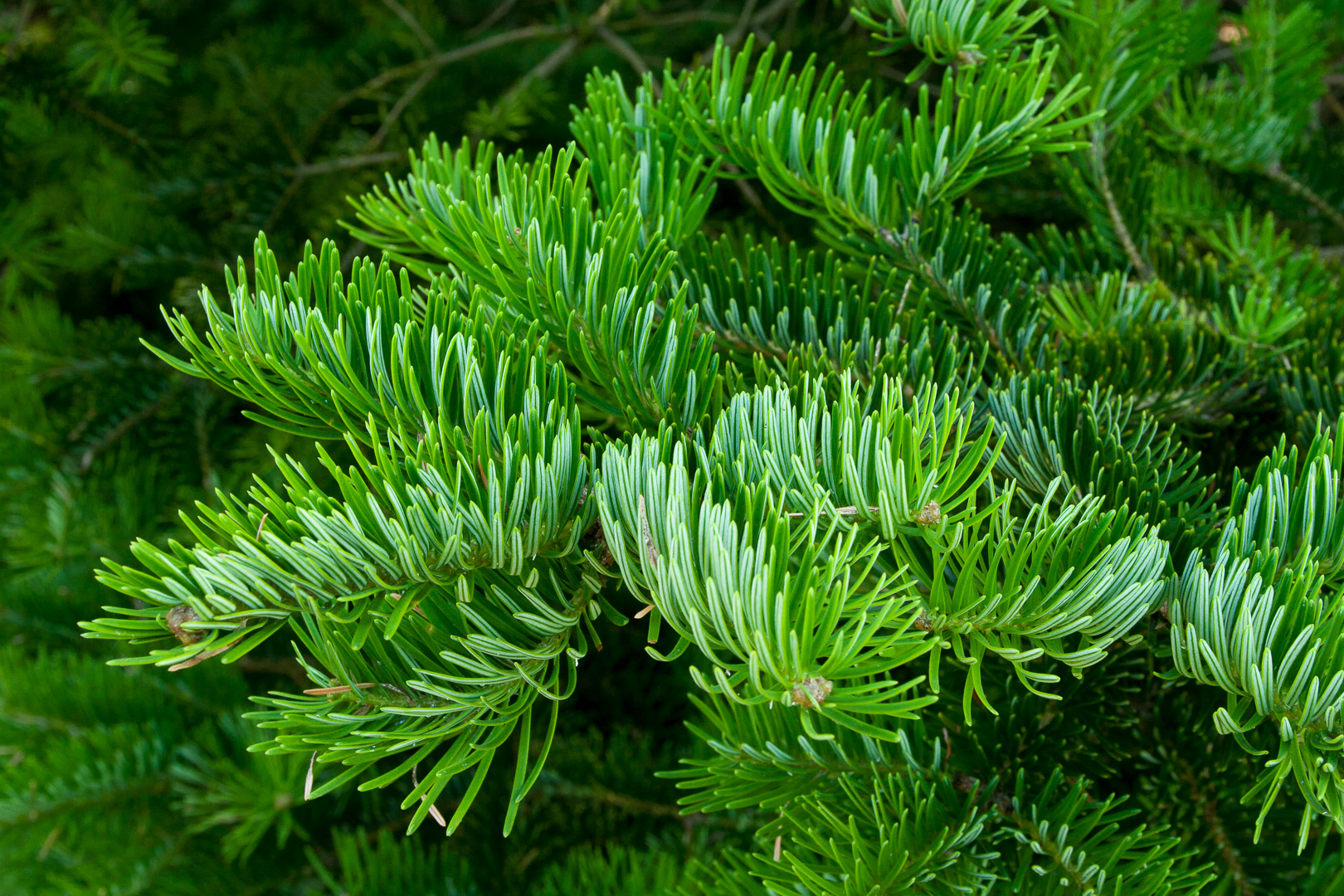
Foliage - characteristic for fir: flat needle leaves with two whitish stripes on the bottom
