= Geography of Korea =

Topographic map of Korea

Korea comprises the Korean Peninsula (the mainland) and 3,960 nearby islands. The peninsula is located in Northeast Asia, between China and Japan. To the northwest, the Yalu River separates Korea from China and to the northeast, the Tumen River separates Korea from China and Russia. The Yellow Sea lies to the west, the East China Sea and Korea Strait to the south, and the Sea of Japan (East Sea) to the east. Notable islands include Jeju, Ulleung, and the Liancourt Rocks.

At 223,179 km^{2}, the area of Korea is similar to the area of the United Kingdom (244,100 km^{2}) or the U.S. state of Minnesota (225,171 km^{2}). Excluding the islands, the area of the Korean Peninsula is 220,847 km^{2}. The peninsula measures approximately 1,000 km (620 mi) from north to south and 300 km (190 mi) from east to west.

== Topography ==
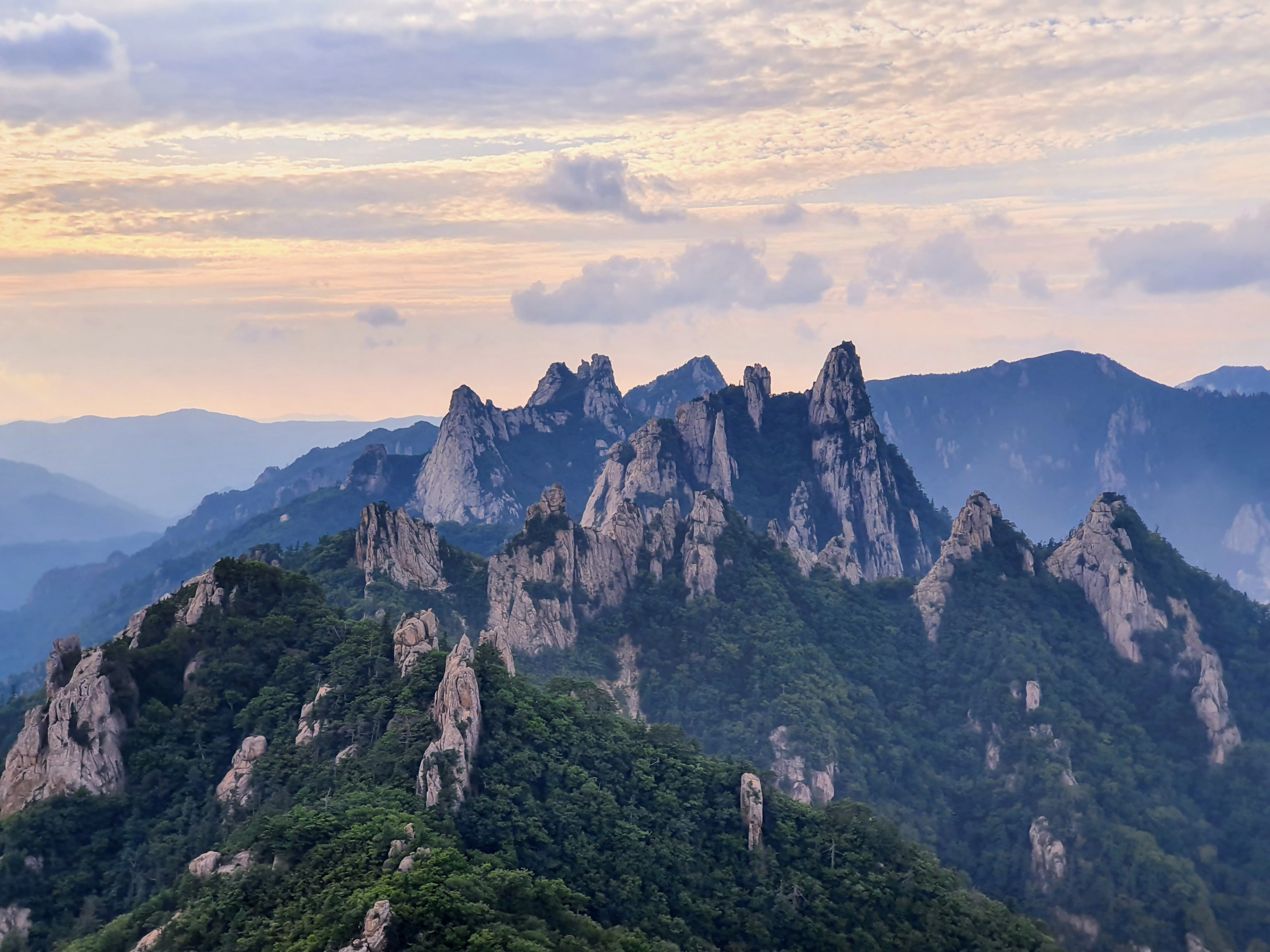
Dinosaur Ridge of Mount Seorak

Mountains cover 70 percent of Korea, especially in the eastern and northern parts. Well-developed arable plains, mostly in southern and western parts of the peninsula, are generally small and separated by successive mountain ranges.

The highest mountains are in the northeast. Mount Paektu, a dormant volcano on the border with China, is the highest mountain in Korea at 2,744 m (9,003 ft). The southern extension of Mount Paektu, a highland called Kaema Plateau, was mainly raised during the Cenozoic orogeny and partly covered by volcanic matter. It is bounded by the Rangnim Mountains to the west and the Hamgyong Mountains to the east.

The principal drainage divide (named Baekdu-daegan) runs north to south, beginning with the Rangnim Mountains bisecting the north and continuing down the eastern side of the peninsula as the Taebaek Mountains. Several lower, secondary mountain ranges, including the Kangnam Mountains and Sobaek Mountains run southwest from the main dividing range. They developed along the tectonic line of Mesozoic orogeny. Some significant mountains include Mount Sobaek (1,439 m or 4,721 ft), Mount Kumgang (1,638 m or 5,374 ft), Mount Seorak (1,708 m or 5,604 ft), Mount Taebaek (1,567 m or 5,141 ft), and Mount Jiri (1,915 m or 6,283 ft).

Unlike most ancient mountains on the mainland, many important islands in Korea were formed by volcanic activity in the Cenozoic orogeny. Jeju Island, situated off the southern coast, is a large volcanic island whose main mountain, Mount Halla (1,950 m or 6,398 ft), is the highest in South Korea. Ulleung Island is a volcanic island in the Sea of Japan whose composition is more felsic than Jeju. The volcanic islands tend to be younger the more westward they are.

Because the mountainous region is mostly on the eastern part of the peninsula, the main rivers tend to flow westwards. Two exceptions are the southward-flowing Nakdong River and Seomjin River. Important rivers running westward include the Amnok River, the Chongchon River, the Taedong River, the Han River, the Geum River, and the Yeongsan River. These rivers have extensive alluvial plains and provide an ideal environment for wet-rice cultivation.

The peninsula has 8,460 km (5,260 mi) of coastline. The southern and southwestern coastlines of Korea are particularly irregular, forming a well-developed ria coastline, and most of Korea's small islands are found here. This convoluted coastline results in mild seas and a calm environment allowing for safe navigation, fishing, and seaweed farming. The Yellow Sea on the western coast has an extremely high tidal range – at Incheon, around the middle of the western coast, it can get as high as 9 m (30 ft). This has led to broad mudflats along the south and west coasts. In contrast, the east coast facing the Sea of Japan (East Sea) is steep and mostly straight, with sandy beaches.

== Geology ==
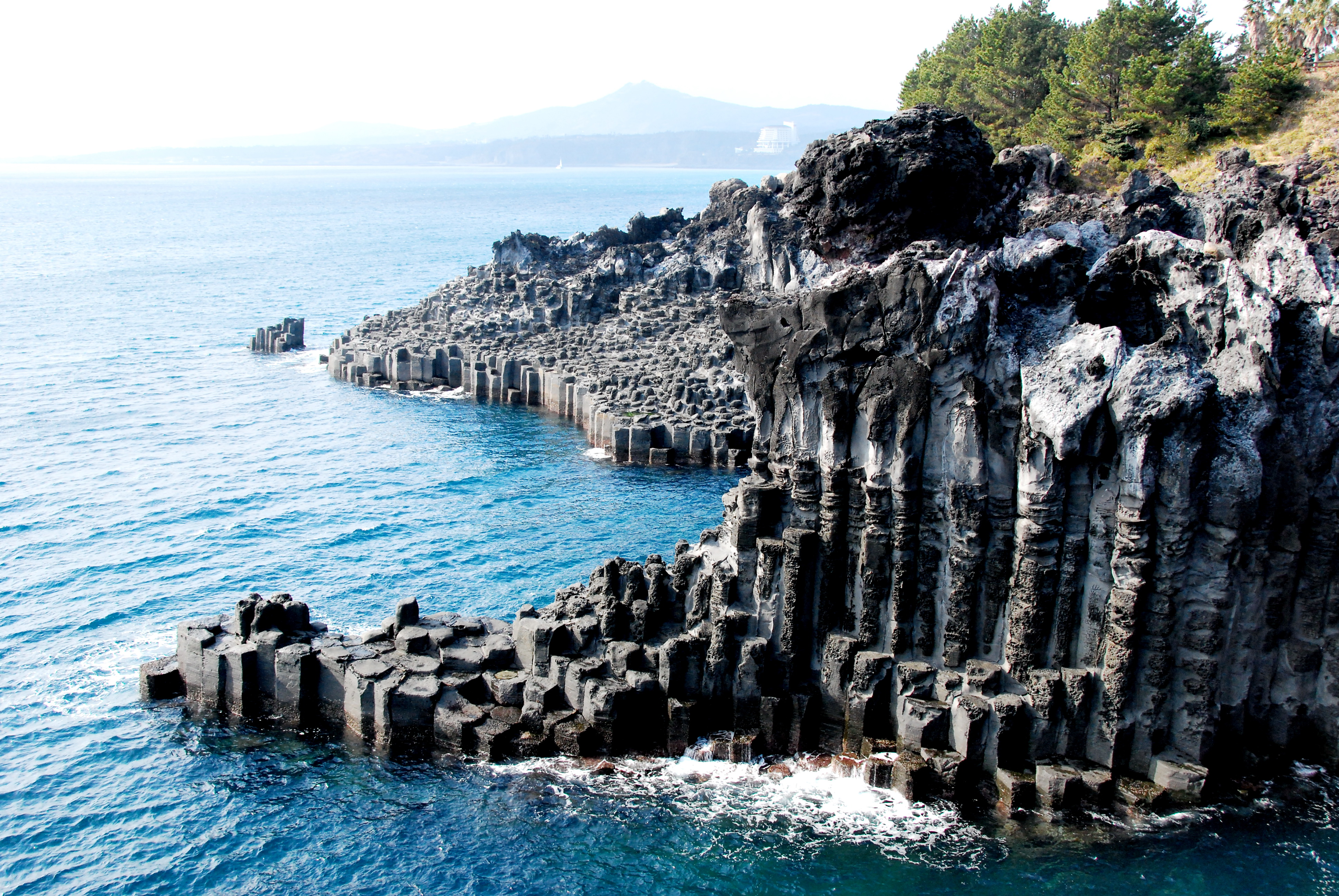
Jeju Island seashore

The terrain of Korea is rumpled, covered with low mountains. Most rocks are of Precambrian origin, although isolated pockets of Paleozoic, Mesozoic, and Cenozoic rock can also be found.

There are no active volcanoes on the peninsula. However, Baekdu Mountain in the north and Hallasan in the south have crater lakes, indicating that they were active not long ago. Furthermore, hot springs indicative of low-level volcanic activity are widespread throughout the peninsula. Roughly two earthquakes are recorded per year, but few have any major impact.

== Climate ==
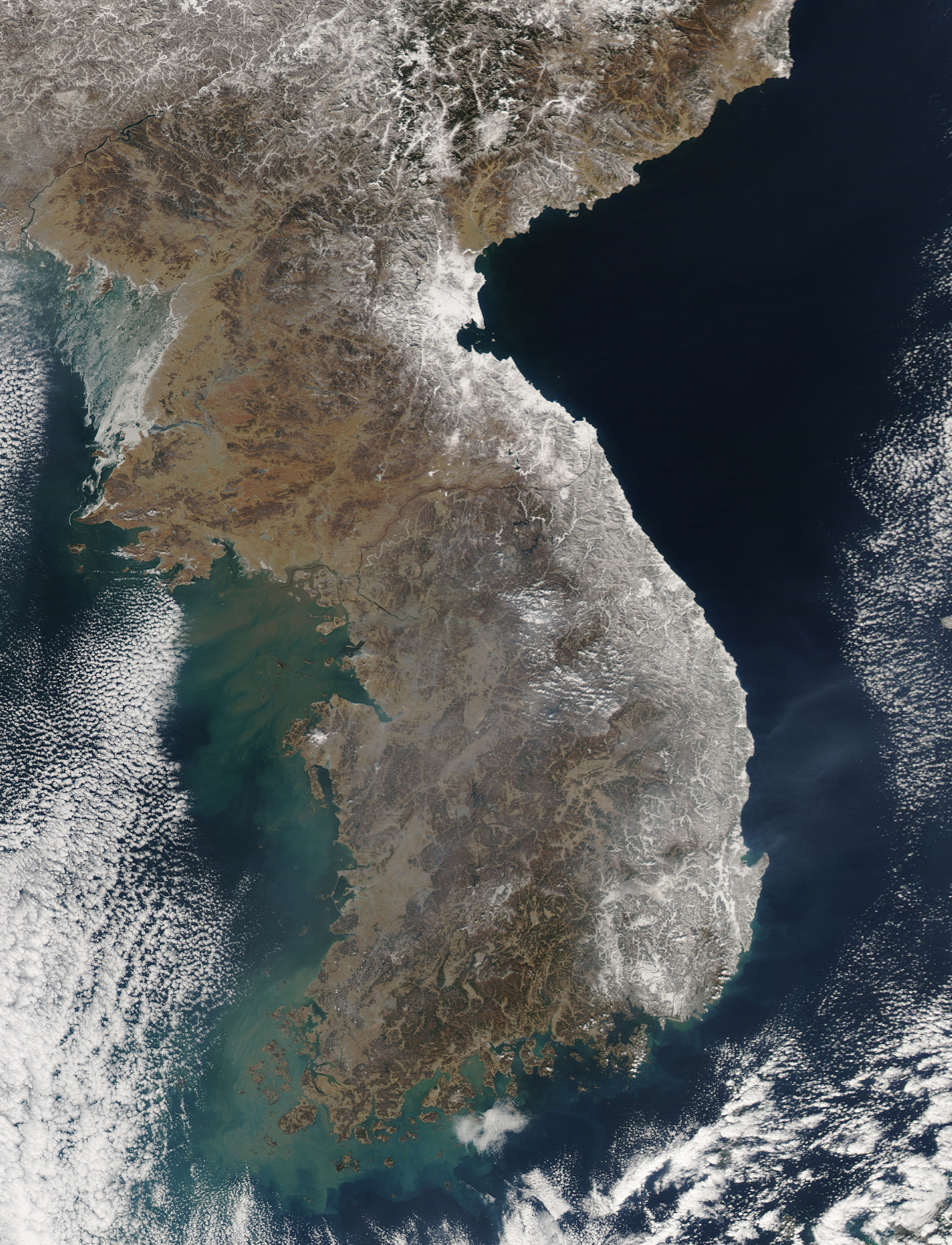
Heavy snow fell on eastern Korea in February 2011

The climate of Korea differs dramatically from north to south. The southern regions experience a relatively warm and wet climate similar to that of Japan, affected by warm ocean waters including the East Korea Warm Current. The northern regions experience a colder and to some extent more inland climate, in common with Manchuria. For example, the annual precipitation of the Yalu River valley (600 mm or 24 in) is less than half of that on the south coast (1,500 mm or 59 in). Likewise, there is a 20 °C (36 °F) difference in January temperature between the peninsula's southern and northern tips.

The entire peninsula, however, is affected by similar climatic patterns, including the East Asian Monsoon in midsummer and frequent typhoons in autumn. The majority of rainfall takes place during the summer months, with nearly half during the monsoon alone. Winters are cold, with January temperatures typically below freezing outside of Jeju Island. Winter precipitation is minimal, with little snow accumulation outside of mountainous areas.

== Biology ==
Surveys of Korean flora have identified more than 3,000 species on the peninsula, of which more than 500 are endemic. The peninsula's floristic provinces are commonly divided between warm-temperate, temperate, and cold-temperate zones. The warm-temperate zone prevails over the southern coast and islands, including Jeju-do. It is largely typified by broad-leaved evergreens.

The temperate zone covers the great majority of the peninsula, away from the southern coast and high mountains. It is dominated by the Korean pine and various broad-leaved deciduous trees. Cold-temperate vegetation is found along the peninsula's northern fringe and in the high mountains, including the upper reaches of Hallasan on Jeju. Evergreens in this area include larch and juniper. Much of this vegetation is shared with Manchuria.

According to the World Wide Fund for Nature, Korea consists of several ecoregions. The Southern Korea evergreen forests occupy the southernmost portion of the peninsula, as well as the island of Jeju. The Central Korean deciduous forests occupy the more temperate central portion of the peninsula. Manchurian mixed forests occupy the northern lowlands and low hills of the peninsula, and extend north into Manchuria as far as the Amur River on the Russia-China border. The Changbai Mountains mixed forests include the higher elevation mountain region along the North Korea-China border, where forests are dominated by conifers, with alpine meadows and rock slopes on the highest peaks.

== See also ==
- Geography of North Korea
- Geography of South Korea
- Korea
  - North Korea
  - South Korea
