= List of Ramsar sites in Russia =

Ramsar sites are natural locations under the protection of the Ramsar Convention for the conservation and sustainable utilization of wetlands. As of March 2013 there were 35 Ramsar sites in Russia, totalling an area of 103,237.67 km^{2}.

The first Russian sites registered in the Ramsar Convention, on 11 October 1976 (during the Soviet era), were Kandalaksha Bay Lake Khanka and the Volga River delta.

In July 2025, Russia announced its withdrawal from Ramsar Convention.

== List of Ramsar sites in Russia ==
Name	Image	Location	Area (km^{2})	Wetland Type(s) *	Other Des.	Description
Area between the Pura River & Mokoritto River		Taymyria; 72°32′N 85°30′E; Borders (PP)	11,250	Vt, Tp, O, Ts, M, N (PDF)	IBA	Hilly plains with diverse network of streams, rivers and lakes distinguish this area from surrounding flat tundra in the central Russian Arctic, in Taymyr Autonomous Okrug. Overlaps the Purinsky Zakaznik. Supports the vulnerable red-breasted goose. Ramsar map (pdf)
Beryozovye Islands		Leningrad Oblast; 60°19′48″N 28°33′36″E; Borders (IBA)	120	G, A, D (PDF)	IBA	"Birch Islands", on the north coast of the Gulf of Finland of the Baltic Sea, on the southeast of Vyborg Bay. 300,000 to 500,000 birds migrate through in the spring - gulls, ducks, geese and swans. Indented shores with many inlets. Ramsar wetland type classifications: G, A, D.(PDF)
Brekhovsky Islands		Taymyr Autonomous Okrug; 70°30′N 82°45′E; Borders (PP)	14,000	L, Ts, U, W, O, M (PDF)	IBA	Brekhovsky Islands in the Yenisei estuary; wetlands and tundra in northern Siberia. Habitat for whitefish (Coregonus) and the endangered Siberian sturgeon (Acipenser baerii).
Chany Lake		Novosibirsk Oblast; 55°2′N 77°40′E; Borders (PP)	3,648	Q, O, R, Tp, M (PDF)		Chany Lake area is a network of Lacustrine plain wetlands characteristic of West Siberian forest-steppe. Enclosed fresh water systems, 100 km north of Kazakhstan border. Mire, meadows, reedbeds, forest-steppe floral communities.
Gorbita River Delta		Taymyria; 73°00′00″N 94°55′00″E; Borders (IBA)	750	Vt, Tp, O, Ts, M, N (PDF)	IBA	Lower valley of the Gorbita River, and adjacent mire complex. Important breeding ground for geese on the Taymyr Peninsula.
Islands in Ob River Estuary		Yamalo-Nenetsia; 66°40′N 70°58′E; Borders (PP)	1,280	F (PDF)		Large floodplain islands where the Ob River opens to Ob Gulf; the Kara Sea is still 500 km to the north. 40% of the islands surfaces are covered with temporary bodies of water (sors). Breeding birds with a density of 500 to 2,000 birds per 10 km2. One of the world's richest habitats for whitefish.
Islands in Onega Bay, White Sea		Karelia; 64°56′N 35°10′E; Borders (PP)	36	A, D, E, U, Xp (PDF)	IBA	Kuzov Islands at the mouth of Onega Bay, the southernmost bay of the White Sea, 150 km west of Arkhangelsk. The islands are rocky and of glacial origin, covered in dwarf forests with stunted pine-birch communities, crowberry, moss and lichen. Supports rare plant and bird species, including the near-threatened razorbill (Alca torda) and the black guillemot (Cepphus grylle).
Kama-Bakaldino Mires		Nizhny Novgorod Oblast; 56°24′N 45°20′E; Borders (PP)	2,265	U, Xp, O (PDF)		Located just north of the Volga River as it flows east, 100 km east of Nizhny-Novgorod. The largest peatland south of the northern European taiga zone. Bogs, fens, raised mires, streams and other wetlands intermixed with stands of pine, birch, and aspen. Important stopover sight for migrating birds.
Kandalaksha Bay		Murmansk Oblast; 66°46′0″N 33°8′0″E; Borders (PP)	2,080	A, B, G, D, H (PDF)	IBA	The northwestern bay of the White Sea, Kandalaksha divides the Kola peninsula from Karelia. Over 850 rocky islands dot the shallow waters, whose rich benthic (sediment-dwelling) sealife support large flocks of migratory waterfowl. Much of the upper bay is protected by the Kandalaksha Nature Reserve, which was formed in 1932 to protect the sea duck.
Karaginsky Island		Kamchatka Krai; 58°47′N 163°52′E; Borders (PP)	1,936	A, D, F, G, E, M, O (PDF)	IBA	Karaginsky is a 2,404 km2 island located 40 km east of the northeast coast of the Kamchatka peninsula in the western Bering Sea. The island is covered with elfin forests (stunted birch and dwarf pine), meadows, and low-bush alpine tundra. The numerous bays and inlets support large populations of diving ducks, gulls, terns, and cormorants; the island is on an important migration route for seabirds.
Khingano-Arkharinskaya Lowland		Amur Oblast; 49°10′N 130°0′E; Borders (PP)	2,000	Ts, Tp, O, M (PDF)	IBA	A "wet forest-steppe" (prairie) ecosystem along the Amur River on the Russian/Chinese border in the Russian Far East, between the Bureya River and the Khingan River. The landscape is an extensive floodplain, with streams, oxbow lakes, marshes, and other wetlands. Grass meadows and reed-beds are extensive, supporting aquatic wildlife that attracts migratory waterfowl (ducks, geese). A large portion is protected by the Khingan Nature Reserve.
Kuban River Delta: Akhtaro-Grivenskaya group of limans		Krasnodar Krai; 44°50′N 38°30′E; Borders (PP)	846	F, O, Q, J, Ts, M, 6, 1, 3, 4, 2, 9. (PDF)	IBA	Extensive delta of the Kuban River and adjacent areas to the Protoka River, on the southeast coast of the Sea of Azov in the southwest of Russia. The land forms are bars and islands of fluvial sediments (limans) in brackish water. Because of the wide variety of wetland types (including freshwater, brackish, and saline areas), there is abundant aquatic life. This supports very large populations of migratory waterfowl (1 - 12 million per year), and large breeding colonies (500,000 individuals).
Kurgalsky Peninsula		Leningrad Oblast; 44°50′N 38°30′E; Borders (PP)	650	A, U, O, E, D (PDF)	IBA	The Kurgalsky peninsula is located 125 km west of St. Petersburg on the south shore of the Gulf of Finland; it borders Estonia to the south. The site is surrounded by shallow waters, and covered with mires (un-forested land with living peat-growing plants) and stands of pine. Kurgalsky hosts large populations of migratory birds, including whooper swans, Bewick's swans, and greylag goose.
Lake Bolon & the mouths of the Selgon River & Simmi Rivers		Khabarovsk Krai; 49°35′N 136°5′E; Borders (PP)	538	O, L, Ts, U, Xp (PDF)	IBA	Lake Bolon is a large, complex floodplain lake in the Lower Amur River region. It is fed by the Selgon and Simmi Rivers in the Khabarovosk region of the Russian Far East. 80% of birds migrating through the Lower Amur region stop at Lake Bolon area, approximately 1 million per year. A wide variety of habitats are supported, including meadows, sedge and reedbeds, peat bogs, and birch forests. Rare fish are also supported.
Lake Khanka		Primorsky Krai; 45°17′N 132°32′E; Borders (PP)	3,100	O, Tp,1-9, W, Xf (PDF)	IBA	Lake Khanka is the largest lake in the Lower Amur River region of the Russian Far East. The site is a cross-border area on the northeast border of China. On the Chinese side it is called "Xingkai Lake National Nature Reserve"; on the Russian side it is protected by the Khanka Nature Reserve. The area provides a stopover point for 1.5 - 2 million birds migrating each year between East Asia and the southeast to Australia. .
Lake Manych-Gudilo		Kalmykia & Rostov Oblast; 45°42′N 42°50′E; Borders (PP)	1,126	Q (PDF)	IBA	Lake Manych-Gudilo is a connected series of shallow salt lakes with many islands, located in the flat depression between the Black Sea and the Caspian Sea about 200 km southeast of Rostov-on-Don. Situation among black-earth grasslands, the zooplankton and benthic aquatic life are abundant, supporting an important staging area for migrating birds, particularly geese and shorebirds. Much of the site is protected by the federal Chyornye Zemli Nature Reserve.
Lake Udyl & the mouths of the Bichi Bitki & Pilda Rivers		Khabarovsk Krai; 52°9′N 139°51′E; Borders (PP)	576	O, L, Ts, U, Xp (PDF)	IBA	Lake Udyl is a 330 km2 freshwater lake, 200 km upstream from the mouth of the Amur River on the Sea of Okhotsk in the Russian Far East. The lake is shallow (2–3 meters in summer), with adjacent wet meadows and mires. It supports the largest population of the swan goose and Steller's sea eagle in the Amur region.
Lower Dvuobje		Khanty–Mansi & Yamalo-Nenetsia; 64°32′N 65°46′E; Borders (PP)	5,400	Ts, P, O, W, Tp, M (PDF)		Located on the Ob River floodplain, the largest floodplain in northern Eurasia, 100 km south of where the Ob opens into the Ob Gulf. The Ramsar site is split into three sectors to cover the mouths of tributary rivers. The extensive wetlands are an important breeding and molting ground for ducks and swans, and is an important feeding ground for sturgeon and whitefish.
Moroshechnaya River		Kamchatka Krai; 56°21′N 156°15′E; Borders (PP)	2,190	U, J, O, Tp, W, M (PDF)	IBA	Located on the west-central coast of the Kamchatka peninsula. The site covers the Moroshechnaya River valley, with many oxbow lakes and a saline lagoon on the Okhotsk Sea. The terrain is peat soil on loose Neogene rocks. Among the many breeding and molting birds is the largest population of the bean goose (Anser fabalis).
Mshinskaya Wetland system		Leningrad Oblast; 59°3′0″N 30°13′0″E; Borders (PP)	751	U, Xp, O, M (PDF)		A bird sanctuary. Rare species of birds include osprey, golden eagle, white stork, black stork, black-throated loon, whooper swan, Eurasian curlew, Eurasian eagle-owl, and Eurasian bittern.
Oka River & Pra River floodplains		Ryazan Oblast; 55°31′N 40°33′E; Borders (PP)	1,615	M, Ts, O, Xp, U (PDF)		Lowland rivers, oxbow lakes, and forested peatlands 120 km east of Moscow in the Ryazan region. Covering part of the area known as the Meshcora lowlands, the site features extensive fens in the center of the area, peatlands in the northwest, and meadows to the east. Over 70 species of aquatic plants are found within the borders. 50% of the white-fronted goose population uses the site during migration.
Parapolsky Dol		Kamchatka Krai; 61°37′N 165°47′E; Borders (PP)	12,000	Vt, O, P, U, Tp, M (PDF)		Located on the main migratory bird flyway from South-East Asia to Chukotka and Yakutia regions.
Pskovsko-Chudskaya Lowland		Pskov Oblast; 58°9′N 27°52′E; Borders (PP)	936	O, L, Ts, Xp, U, M (PDF)	IBA	Covers as series of freshwater lakes along lakes Chudskoye, Teploye and Pskovskoye on the border between Russia and Estonia, 7 km northwest of the city of Pskov. Aside from its importance as a stopover site for migratory birds, the site plays a key role in filtering groundwater and protecting freshwater fish. Of the 277 species of birds recorded, over 200 are breeding, including significant populations of great crested grebe and Eurasian coot.
Selenga Delta		Buryatia; 52°17′N 106°22′E; Borders (PP)	121	L (PDF)	IBA	The Selenga River enters Lake Baikal from the east, forming a delta that is about 85% regularly flooded meadows. The delta, the largest in the Baikal catchment, is a critical nesting site for waterfowl. The delta also filters the river water before it enters the lake itself. The Ramsar site borders cover about 25% of the overall delta, and is protected by the Kabansky Nature Reserve.
Southern coast of the Gulf of Finland		Leningrad Oblast; 60°0′N 29°15′E; Borders (PP)	64	A, E, G (PDF)		The Ramsar site on the south side of the bridge over the Gulf of Finland to Kotlin Island. The small, shallow bay of reed beds Phragmites and sandy beaches is an important staging ground for the spring migration of waterfowl, and to a lesser extent the fall migration. One 10 km2 area has recorded 25,000 swans and 100,000 diving ducks. 17 species from the area are listed in the Red Book of vulnerable species in the area, including the smew
Svir River Delta		Leningrad Oblast; 60°35′N 32°56′E; Borders (PP)	605	L, U, Ts, Tp, O, M (PDF)	IBA	The Svir River enters Lake Ladoga on the east side, through a delta of channels, lakes, marshes, wet meadows and polder. The Ramsar site includes 6,500 ha of the shallow water area of Lake Ladoga. The site is an important staging breeding ground for migratory birds. Counts of migrating geese have been found at 150,000, and 600,000 ducks.
Tobol-Ishim Forest-steppe		Tyumen Oblast; 55°27′N 69°0′E; Borders (PP)	12,170	Q, O, R, P, N (PDF)		The Tobol-Isham site is a flat (around 100 meters above sea level) forest-steppe region of lakes and marshy depressions in the south of the West Siberian Plain. The landscape is one of willow and birch forests, supporting woodland animals, and bogs in the north, sedges in the middle, and grass-reed communities in the south. The area is on a major migration route for birds, between West Siberia and wintering grounds from western Europe to southwestern Asia.
Torey Lakes		Chita Oblast; 50°05′N 115°32′E; Borders (PP)	1,725	Q, R, Ss, Ts, P, M (PDF)	IBA	Located on the border between Russia and Mongolia, Torey Lakes is a system of soda lakes in the steppe region southeast of Lake Baikal. The biodiversity of the site is very high because it is a meeting zone of many fauna communities: taiga, tundra, broad-leaved forests, and steppe. Over 305 bird species have been recorded, including 90 breeding species. Much of the site is protected by the Daursky Nature Reserve.
Upper Dvuobje		Khanty–Mansi; 64°32′N 65°46′E; Borders (PP)	4,700	P, Ts, Tp, O, M (PDF)		The Upper Dvuobje site is a network of floodplain tributaries of the Ob River on the West Siberian Plain. The site features meandering river channels, permanent and seasonal lakes, forested islands, and meadows. Because of the wide variety of habitats interacting with each other, the terrestrial and aquatic life is diverse. Migrating birds number 500,000 to 3 million each year, and 300,000 are estimated to breed on the site.
Utkholok		Kamchatka Krai; 57°40′N 157°11′E; Borders (PP)	2,200	U, L, O, M (PDF)	IBA	The Utkholok site is located on the west coast of the Kamchatka peninsula north of Ust'-Khayryuzovo. It can be found on and surrounding Cape Cape Utkholoksky, which juts out into the Sea of Okhotsk, and the wetlands of the Utkholok River and Kvachina River. With extensive tundra wetlands (mostly crowberry and sedges) and bogs, the area is important to migrating and breeding birds, particularly the bean goose (Anser fabalis). The rivers are important spawning grounds for golden trout.
Veselovskoye Reservoir		Rostov Oblast; 46°55′N 41°02′E; Borders (PP)	3,090	O, 3, 1 (PDF)	IBA	A chain of lakes and reservoirs, about 75 km southeast of Rostov-on-Don in the flat plain of the Manych River valley between the Black Sea and Caspian Sea. Terrain is many small islands, shallow bays. The site is an important staging, breeding, and moulting ground for waterfowl, particularly geese and is also important for wintering birds.
Volga River Delta		Astrakhan Oblast; 45°54′N 48°47′E [ Borders (PP)]	8,000	L, Q (PDF)	IBA	The delta of the Volga River as it enters the Caspian Sea from the northwest, is the largest inland river delta in Europe. The terrain is a network of riverine floodplains, and islands. The site features rich biodiversity in both fish and birds. A portion of the delta is protected by the Astrakhan Nature Reserve.
Wetlands in the Lower Bagansky District area		Novosibirsk Oblast; 54°9′N 78°23′E; Borders (PP)	269	Q, R, P, N (PDF)	IBA	Located in an herb and feather-grass steppe zone, the lower Bagan River features many small lakes with varying levels of salinity and permanence. Vegetation includes halophytic (salt-tolerant) species, reed-beds, and meadows. Water levels vary from year to year, and the importance of the site also varies for migrating and breeding birds as it is an alternative when the Chany Lakes site (50 km to the north) experiences a dry year.
Zeya-Bureya Plains		Amur Oblast; 49°55′N 127°39′E; Borders (PP)	316	Ts, O, M (PDF)		Floodplains of the Zeya River and Bureya River, 20 km south of Blagoveshchensk in the Amur valley of Amur Oblast. 5–10 km wide, the site features islands and beaches in the lower reaches, and marshes and oxbow lakes on the higher terraces. The site is important for migrating and breeding birds. The temperatures in the area are the highest in the Russian Far East, with mean temperatures over 20 °C (68 °F).

== Classification codes for Ramsar wetland types ==
- Ramsar classification codes are listed for each site in descending order of area cover at the site.

Marine / coastal wetlands

- A - permanent shallow marine waters
- B - marine subtidal aquatic beds
- C - coral reefs
- D - rocky marine shores
- E - sand, shingle or pebble shores
- F - estuarine waters
- G - intertidal mud, sand or salt flats
- H - intertidal marshes
- I - intertidal forested wetlands
- J - coastal brackish/saline lagoons
- K - coastal freshwater lagoons
- Zk(a) - karst, other subterranean, marine/coastal

Inland wetlands

- L - permanent inland deltas
- M - permanent rivers/streams/creeks
- N - intermittent rivers/streams/creeks
- O - permanent freshwater lakes
- P - intermittent freshwater lakes
- Q - permanent saline/brackish/alkaline lakes
- R - intermittent saline/brackish/alkaline lakes and flats
- Sp - permanent saline/brackish/alkaline marshes/pools
- Ss - intermittent saline/brackish/alkaline marshes/pools
- Tp - permanent freshwater marshes/pools
- Ts - intermittent freshwater marshes/pools on inorganic soils
- U - non-forested peatlands

- Va - alpine wetlands
- Vt - tundra wetlands
- W - shrub-dominated wetlands
- Xf - freshwater, tree-dominated wetlands
- Xp - forested peatlands; peatswamp forests
- Y - freshwater springs; oases
- Zg - geothermal wetlands
- Zk(b) - karst other subterranean, inland

Human-made wetlands

- 1-9 (various; see full list)

== See also ==
- Ramsar Convention
- List of Ramsar sites worldwide
