= Badzhal Range =

Mountain range in Russia

- Баджальский хребет
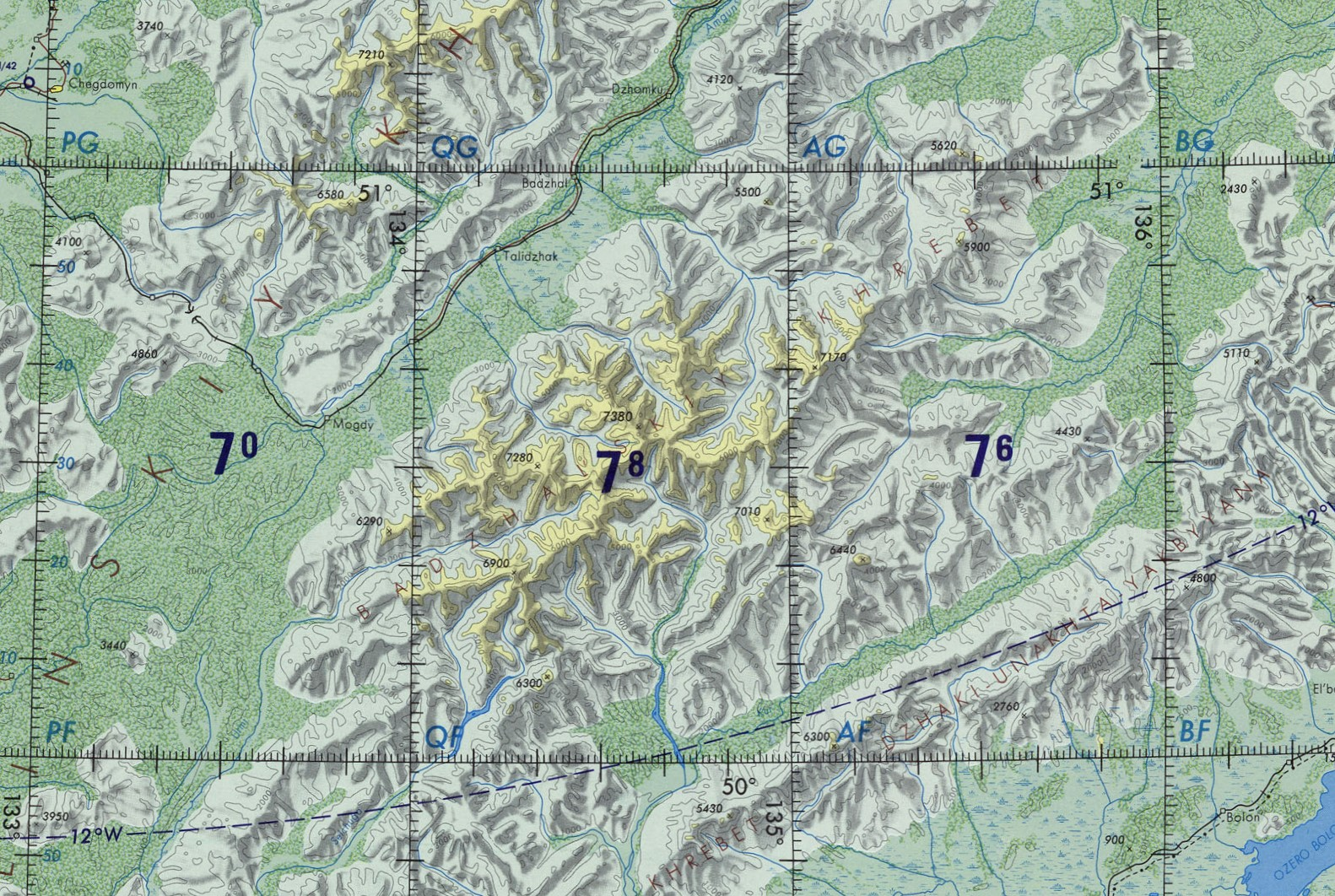
- Badzhal Range map section

Highest point
- Peak: Gora Ulun
- Elevation: 2,221 m (7,287 ft)
- Coordinates: 50°30′32″N 134°19′35″E

Dimensions
- Length: 220 km (140 mi) SW/NE
- Width: 50 km (31 mi) NW/SE

Geography
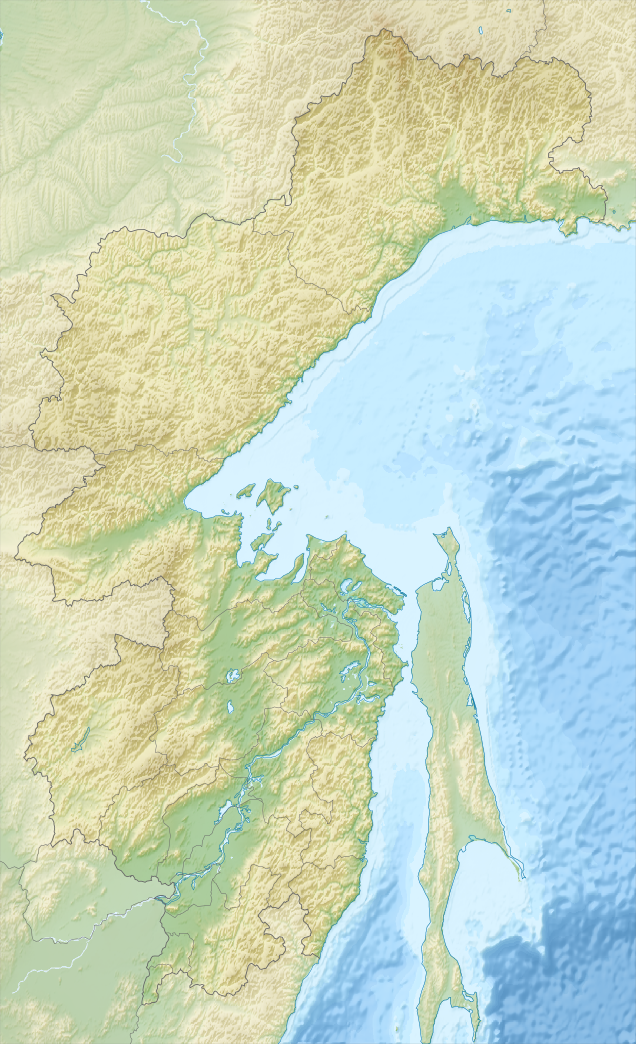
- Location within Khabarovsk Krai
- Country: Russia
- Federal subject: Khabarovsk Krai
- Range coordinates: 50°30′N 134°45′E

Geology
- Orogeny: Alpine orogeny
- Rock age: Permian
- Rock type(s): Volcanic rock, sandstone and shale

The Badzhal Range (Russian: Баджальский хребет, Badzhalskiy Khrebet) is a mountain range in Khabarovsk Krai, Russian Far East.

The mountains are mainly composed of volcanic rock, sandstone and shale, as well as chalk, and andesite-basalt, with granites, porphyry and gabbro-granodiorite intrusions.

== Geography ==
The Badzhal Range consists of a system of separate ridges of moderate alpine relief with a total length of about 220 kilometres (140 mi). The highest point is Gora Ulun, with a height of 2,221 metres (7,287 ft). In its flanks the range is bound by the Amur to the NW and its tributary Amgun river valleys to the SE. At its ends it is limited by the valleys of the Gorin, a left tributary of the Amur, and the Urmi, a right tributary of the Tunguska, also a left tributary of the Amur. To the southwest the Badzhal Range connects with the Bureya Range.

=== Hydrography ===
The sources of the Gorin River are located in the Dayana Ridge subrange. Other rivers originating in the Badzhal Range are the Gerbi, Talidzhak and Badzhal. There are karst lakes in the range area.

== Flora ==
The slopes of the range are covered deciduous forests, followed by taiga with a predominance of fir and Siberian spruce at higher elevations. Mountain tundra of shrubs and lichens grows in the highest summits.

== See also ==
- List of mountains and hills of Russia
