= Amazar (river) =

Amazar Амазар
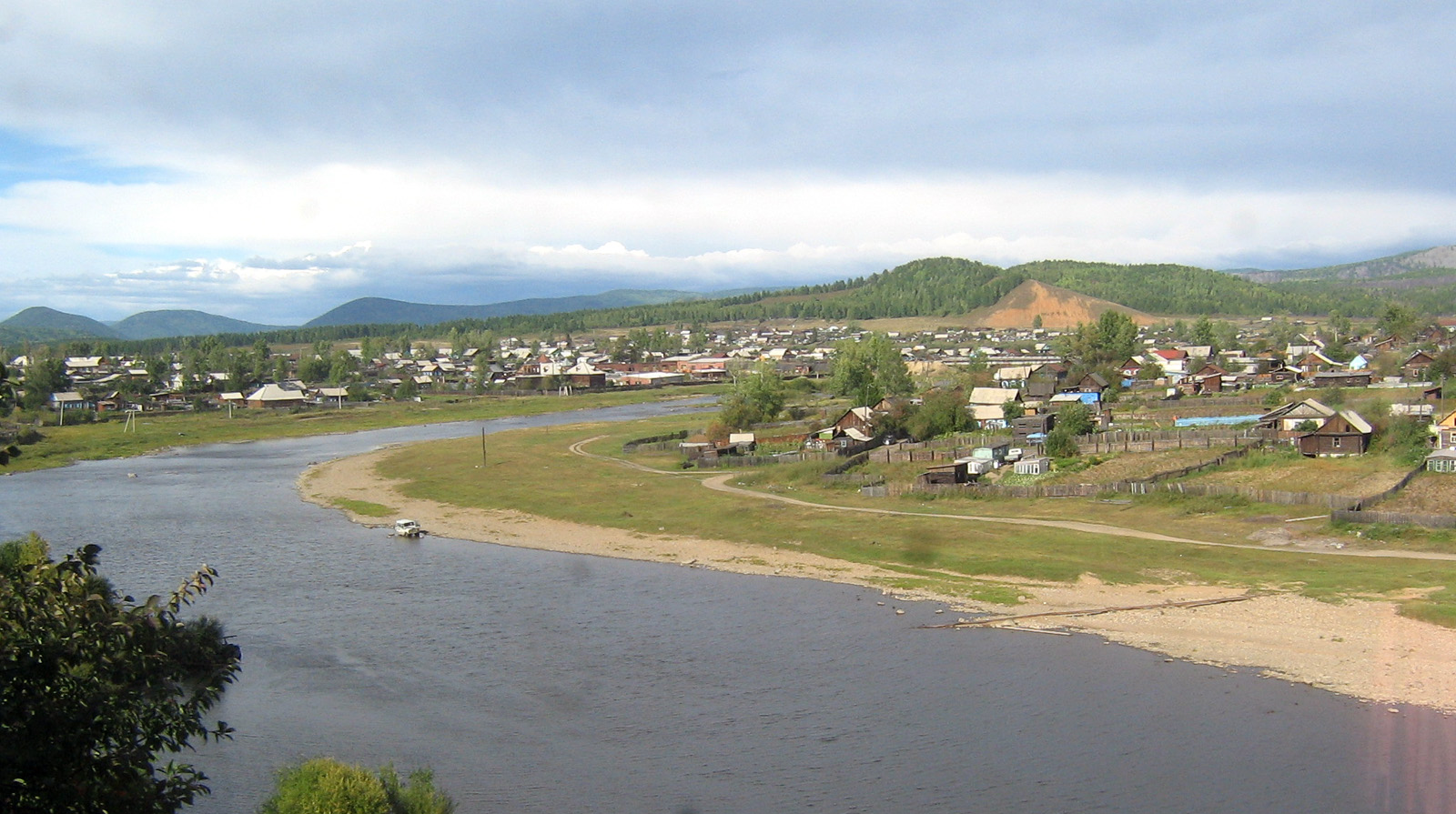
- View of the Amazar in Mogocha

- Mouth location in Zabaykalsky Krai, Russia

Location
- Country: Russia

Physical characteristics
- Source
  - location: Confluence of the Big Amazar and Small Amazar
  - coordinates: 53°50′34″N 119°38′06″E
  - elevation: 634 m (2,080 ft)
- Mouth: Amur
  - coordinates: 53°25′30″N 122°04′45″E
- Length: 290 km (180 mi)
- Basin size: 11,100 km^{2} (4,300 sq mi)
- Discharge
  - average: 31.7 m^{3}/s (1,120 cu ft/s)

Basin features
- Progression: Amur→ Sea of Okhotsk

The Amazar (Russian: Амазар) is a river in Zabaykalsky Krai, Russia. It is a tributary of the Amur, with a length of 290 kilometres (180 mi) and a drainage basin area of 11,100 square kilometres (4,300 mi^{2}).

The name originated in the Evenki language, meaning "mouth in the ground".

A stretch of the Trans-Siberian Railway runs along the valley of the Amazar with Mogocha, Razdolnaya, Taptugary and Semiozerny stations located near the river.

The Amazar is the river in Transbaikalia where salmon are more abundant.

== Course ==
The Amazar is a left tributary of the Amur. It is formed in the slopes of the Cheromny Range, Olyokma-Stanovik Highlands, at the confluence of the Big Amazar (Bolshoy Amazar) and Small Amazar (Maly Amazar). In its upper course it flows roughly southeastwards across mountainous terrain, forming the northern limit of the Amazar Range. The river bed is subject to human interference in certain stretches, where it is dredged for the extraction of alluvial minerals, affecting natural biodiversity. The town of Mogocha lies at the confluence of its Mogocha tributary, where the river channel branches and the floodplain widens, forming up to 300 m (980 ft) long islands. Downstream from the confluence of the Bolshoi Chichatka, the Amazar crosses the Amazar Range. Further down the river forms large bends and in some stretches there are lakes in the floodplain. Some of the rocky shore areas are picturesque, but the scars of gold mining are quite apparent. Finally the bottom of the valley expands and the Amazar joins the Amur 2,780 km (1,730 mi) from its mouth. The confluence is close to the Amur Oblast and Heilongjiang tripoint, 44 km (27 mi) downstream from the mouths of the Argun and Shilka.

The largest tributary of the Amazar is the 46 kilometres (29 mi) long Bolshoy Chichatka (Big Chichatka) that joins it from the left and has a drainage basin area of 2,840 square kilometres (1,100 mi^{2}). There are 104 small lakes in the river basin, with a total area of 2.55 km^{2} (0.98 sq mi). The river freezes to the bottom between October and late April or early May.

Basin of the Amur

== See also ==
- List of rivers of Russia
