= Kur (Khabarovsk Krai) =

Location
- Country: Russia

Physical characteristics
- Mouth: Tunguska
  - coordinates: 48.7304°N 134.2831°E
- Length: 434 km (270 mi)
- Basin size: 13,700 km^{2} (5,300 sq mi)

Basin features
- Progression: Tunguska→ Amur→ Sea of Okhotsk

The Kur (Russian: Кур) is a river in the Khabarovsk Krai, Russia. At its confluence with the river Urmi it forms the Tunguska, which is a left tributary of the Amur. It is 434 kilometres (270 mi) long, and has a drainage basin of 13,700 square kilometres (5,300 sq mi).

The Kur and Urmi often flood in the summer.

Basin of the Amur

== Sources ==
- Kur River (in Russian)
