= Huma County =

Huma County 呼玛县
- County
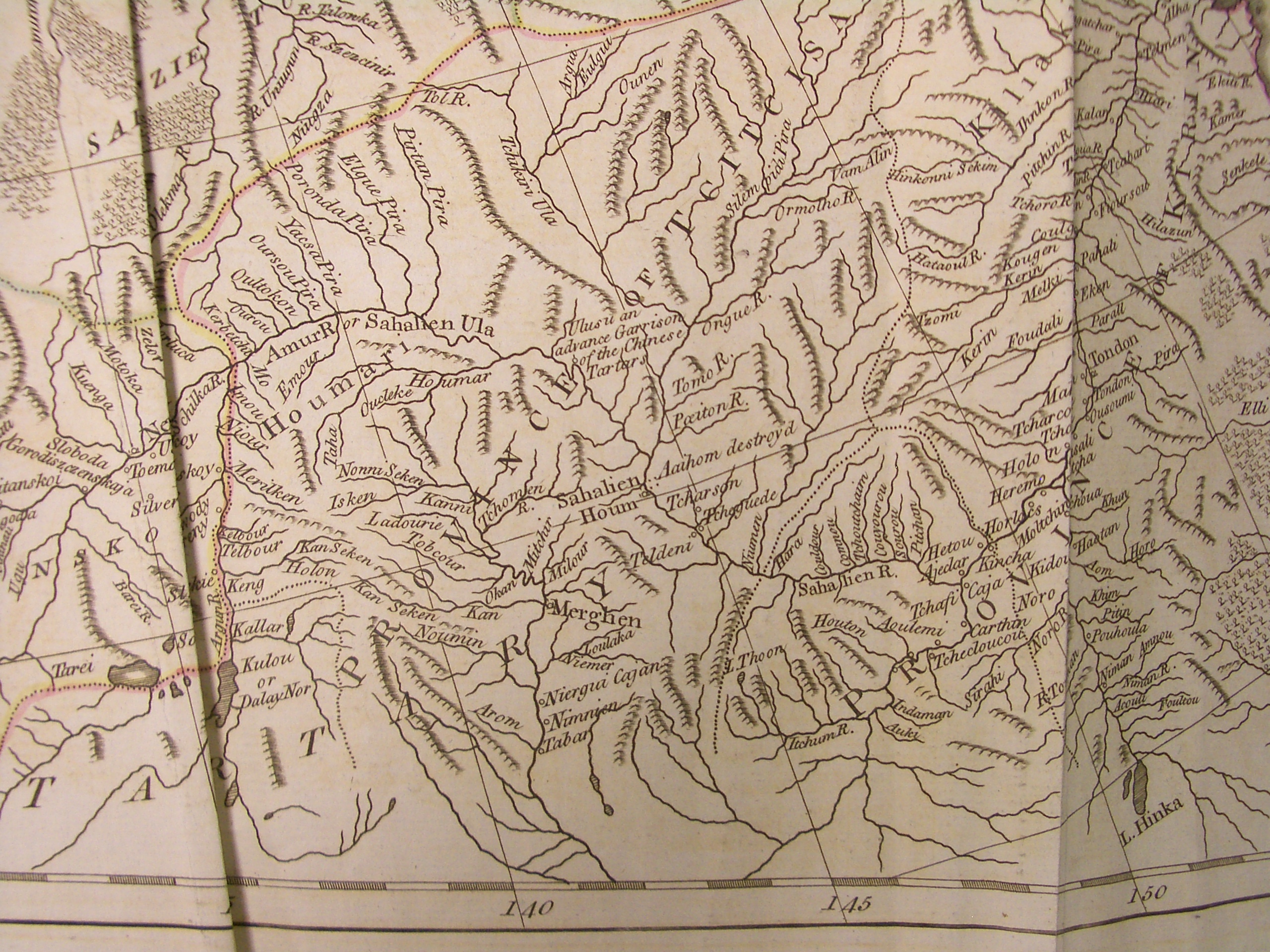
- The Huma River was shown as Houmar on early maps (1773), the surrounding region labeled Houmari

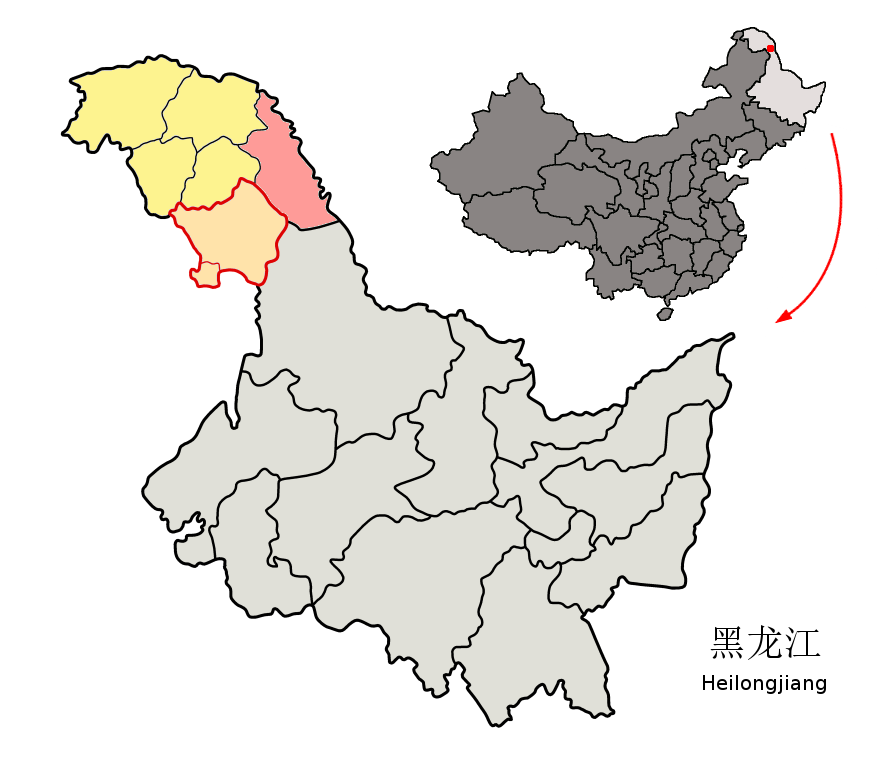
- Huma County (red) in Daxing'anling Prefecture (yellow) and Heilongjiang

- Location of the seat in Heilongjiang
- Coordinates: 51°44′N 126°39′E
- Country: People's Republic of China
- Province: Heilongjiang
- Prefecture: Daxing'anling

Area
  - Total: 14,285 km^{2} (5,515 sq mi)
- Elevation: 170 m (560 ft)

Population
  - Total: 340,000
  - Density: 24/km^{2} (62/sq mi)
- Time zone: UTC+8 (China Standard)
- Postal code: 165100
- Area code: 0457

Huma County (simplified Chinese: 呼玛县; traditional Chinese: 呼瑪縣; pinyin: Hūmǎ xiàn; Manchu: Hūmar Siyan; Russian: Кумары) is a county in the far north of the Heilongjiang province, People's Republic of China. The county seat is located on the right (southwestern) bank of the Amur River, a few kilometers upstream from the fall of the Huma River (formerly also known as Houmar) into the Amur. It is under the administration of the Daxing'anling Prefecture.

The opposite side of the Amur River is in Amur Oblast, Russia, where there is a village with the same name in Russified form, Kumara (Russian: Кумара).

== History ==
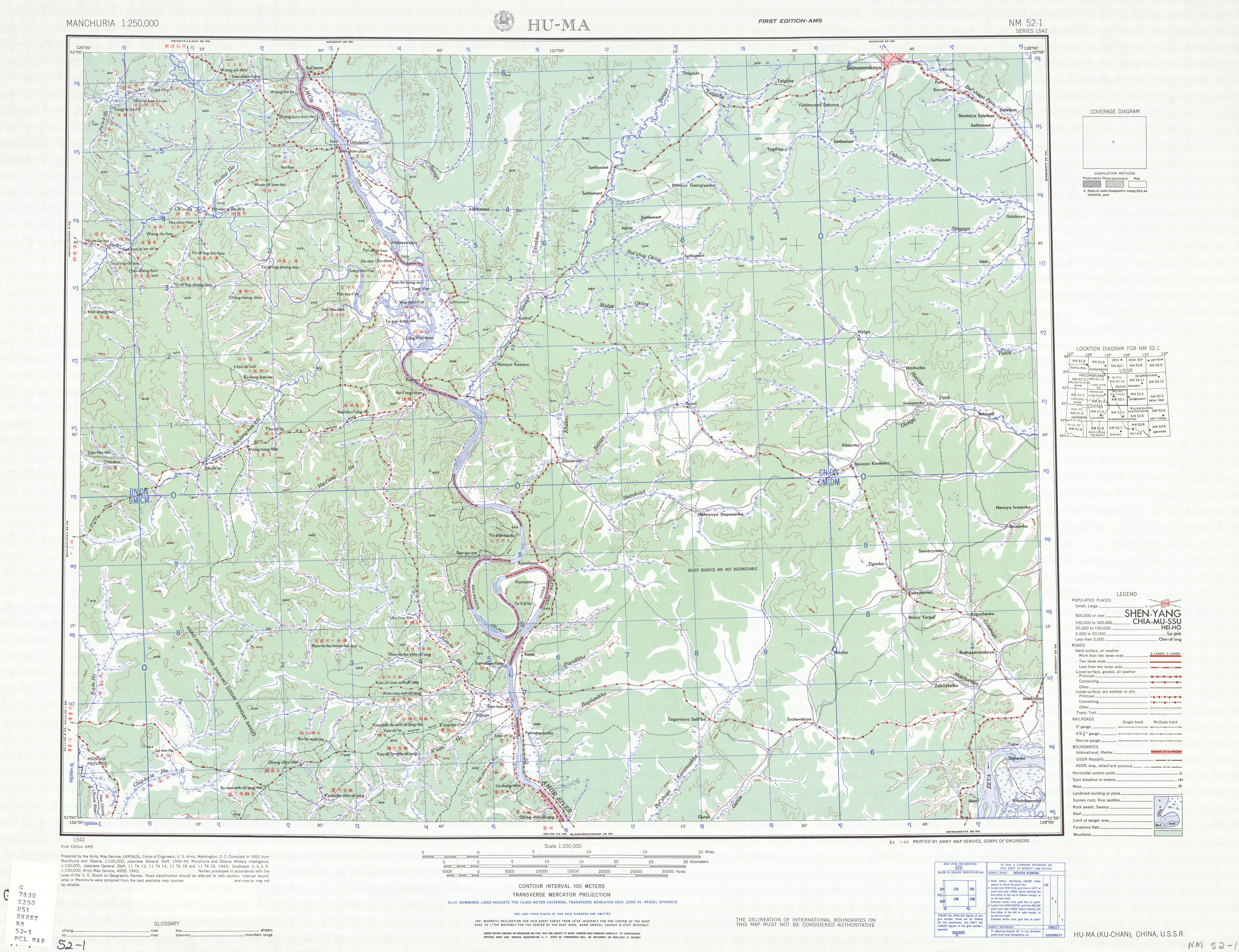
Huma (labelled as Hu-ma 呼瑪) (1951)

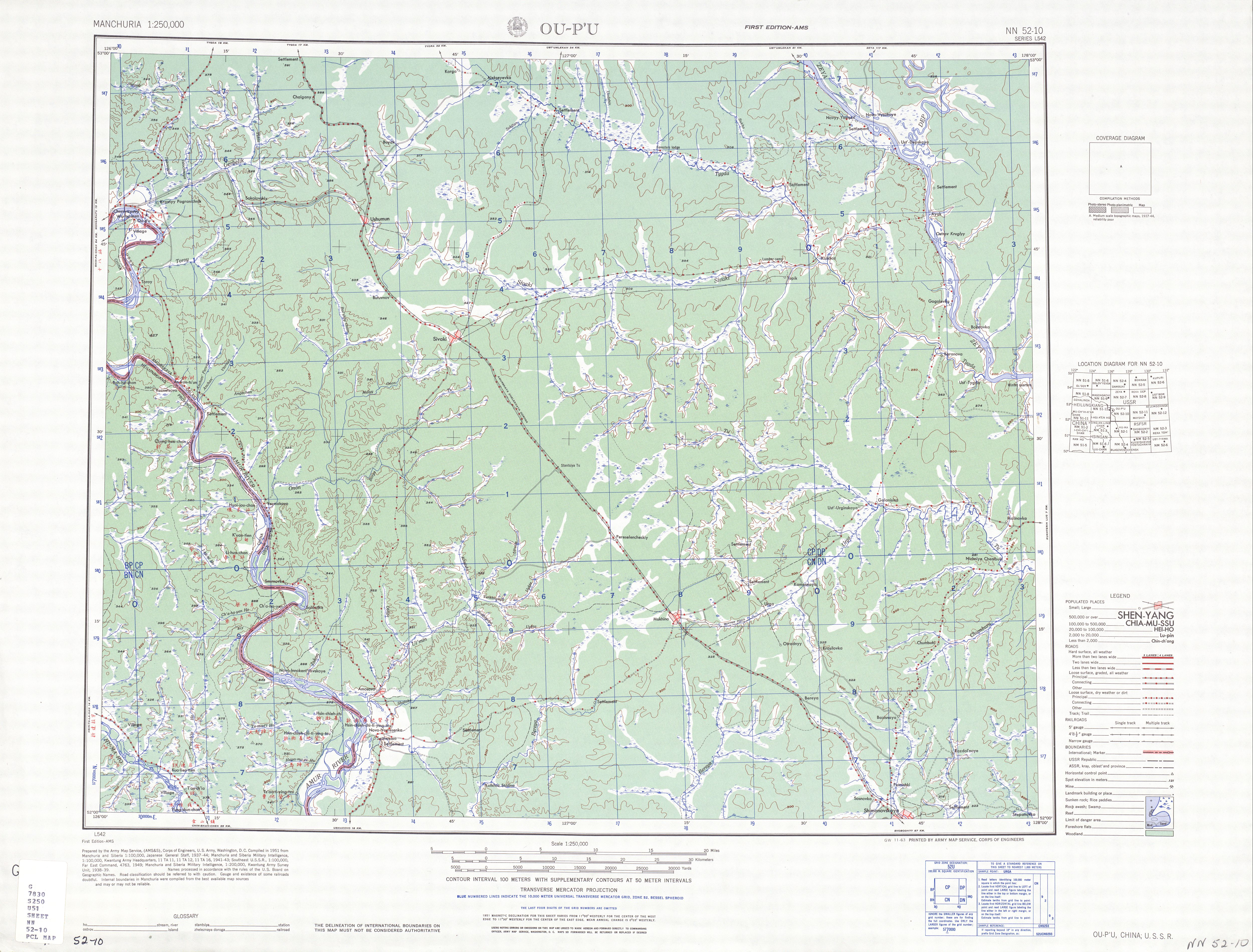
Oupu (labelled as Ou-p'u 鷗浦) (1951)

Kumarsk, the predecessor of the present-day Huma, was a fortified Russian town in the Amur River region, founded in 1652 by Yerofey Khabarov and his companions, during his retreat from Achansk, corresponding to the present-day Khabarovsk, where he was besieged by Manchu and Daur allied forces.

On 13 March 1655, the Komar fortress, defended by the ataman Onufriy Stepanov and his 500 Cossacks, was besieged by a Qing army led by Ming'andali (明安達理) consisting of 10,000 men. The outnumbered defenders repulsed several assaults. The defeated Manchu lift the siege the following month (on 3 April 1655). The town was ceded to Qing Empire after the treaty of Nerchinsk in 1689.

== Administrative divisions ==
Huma County is divided into 2 towns, 5 townships and 1 ethnic township.

2 towns

- Huma (呼玛镇)
- Hanjiayuan (韩家园镇)

5 townships

- Sanka (三卡乡)
- Jinshan (金山乡)
- Xinghua (兴华乡)
- Oupu (鸥浦乡)
- Beijiang (北疆乡)

1 ethnic township

- Baiyinna Oroqen (白银纳鄂伦春族民族乡)

== Climate ==
Huma County has a monsoon-influenced humid continental climate (Köppen Dwb) with very warm, humid summers and severely cold, extremely dry winters. The monthly 24-hour average temperature ranges from −24.7 °C (−12.5 °F) in January to 21.3 °C (70.3 °F) in July, and although temperatures consistently average above 10 °C (50 °F) from May to September, the annual mean, at −0.3 °C (31.5 °F), is low enough to form sporadic permafrost on sheltered sites, which is unusual for areas with this climatic classification. More than 70% of the annual precipitation occurs from June to September. With monthly percent possible sunshine ranging from 52% in May and July to 70% in February, sunshine is generous and the area receives 2,581 hours of bright sunshine annually.

Climate data for Huma, elevation 174 m (571 ft), (1991−2020 normals, extremes 1954−present)
Month	Jan	Feb	Mar	Apr	May	Jun	Jul	Aug	Sep	Oct	Nov	Dec	Year
Record high °C (°F)	−1.9 (28.6)	5.1 (41.2)	18.9 (66.0)	31.7 (89.1)	36.2 (97.2)	40.5 (104.9)	39.4 (102.9)	36.5 (97.7)	31.3 (88.3)	28.6 (83.5)	12.2 (54.0)	1.0 (33.8)	40.5 (104.9)
Mean daily maximum °C (°F)	−18 (0)	−10.9 (12.4)	−1.3 (29.7)	10.3 (50.5)	19.3 (66.7)	25.4 (77.7)	27.4 (81.3)	24.9 (76.8)	18.5 (65.3)	7.7 (45.9)	−7.3 (18.9)	−18.2 (−0.8)	6.5 (43.7)
Daily mean °C (°F)	−24.7 (−12.5)	−19.4 (−2.9)	−8.8 (16.2)	3.5 (38.3)	12.2 (54.0)	18.6 (65.5)	21.3 (70.3)	18.5 (65.3)	11.4 (52.5)	1.3 (34.3)	−13.4 (7.9)	−23.9 (−11.0)	−0.3 (31.5)
Mean daily minimum °C (°F)	−29.9 (−21.8)	−26.2 (−15.2)	−16.1 (3.0)	−3.2 (26.2)	4.8 (40.6)	11.8 (53.2)	15.7 (60.3)	13.1 (55.6)	5.4 (41.7)	−4.2 (24.4)	−18.5 (−1.3)	−28.6 (−19.5)	−6.3 (20.6)
Record low °C (°F)	−48.2 (−54.8)	−45.3 (−49.5)	−40.0 (−40.0)	−22.2 (−8.0)	−9.2 (15.4)	0.4 (32.7)	3.9 (39.0)	−1.0 (30.2)	−8.4 (16.9)	−22.2 (−8.0)	−38.9 (−38.0)	−45.2 (−49.4)	−48.2 (−54.8)
Average precipitation mm (inches)	5.4 (0.21)	4.4 (0.17)	6.4 (0.25)	15.1 (0.59)	49.9 (1.96)	66.3 (2.61)	128.0 (5.04)	92.0 (3.62)	47.5 (1.87)	22.6 (0.89)	10.2 (0.40)	7.2 (0.28)	455.0 (17.91)
Average precipitation days (≥ 0.1 mm)	6.7	4.9	4.3	6.6	11.4	12.7	13.7	12.7	10.5	7.7	7.2	8.2	106.6
Average snowy days	9.5	6.7	6.4	5.0	0.7	0	0	0	0.5	5.8	9.6	11.4	55.6
Average relative humidity (%)	70	66	59	49	53	66	75	77	70	61	69	71	66
Mean monthly sunshine hours	152.4	198.8	251.8	244.6	253.1	278.2	258.6	244.5	217.4	191.3	162.6	127.9	2,581.2
Percentage possible sunshine	58	70	68	58	52	56	52	55	58	59	62	53	58
Source 1: China Meteorological Administration
Source 2: Weather China, Pogodaiklimat.ru (extremes)
