= Tungusic =

Tungusic may refer to:

- Tungusic languages of Siberia
- Tungusic peoples, people who speak Tungusic languages

== See also ==
- Tungus (disambiguation)
- Evenki (disambiguation), people and language, also known as Tungus
- Tunguska (disambiguation)
