= Avrorin =

Avrorin, feminine: Avrorina is a Russian surname originated in clergy, derived from the goddess Aurora. Notable people with the surname include:

- Nikolay Avrorin (1906–1991), Soviet geobotanist
- Valentin Avrorin (1907–1977), Soviet linguist
- Yevgeny Avrorin (1932–2018), Soviet and Russian physicist
