= Tunguska =

Tunguska may refer to:

- The Tunguska event, a catastrophic explosion over Siberia in 1908 by Podkamennaya Tunguska

== Places ==
- Tunguska (Amur), tributary of the Amur
- Podkamennaya Tunguska ("Stony Tunguska", also: "Middle Tunguska"), tributary of the Yenisey in Krasnoyarsk Krai, Russia
- Podkamennaya Tunguska (rural locality), a rural locality (a village) in Krasnoyarsk Krai, Russia
- Podkamennaya Tunguska Airport, Krasnoyarsk Krai, Russia
- Nizhnyaya Tunguska ("Lower Tunguska"), tributary of the Yenisey
- Upper Tunguska, an old name of the lower course of the Angara, tributary of the Yenisey
- Sukhaya Tunguska, village
- Tunguska Basin
- Tunguska Nature Reserve
- Tunguska Plateau

== In arts and entertainment ==
- "Tunguska" (The X-Files), a 1996 episode of The X-Files
- Tunguska: Legend of Faith, a 2000 video game
- Secret Files: Tunguska, a 2006 video game
- Tunguska, a 2006 album by Suns of the Tundra
- Tunguska, a 2018 album by Treat
- "Tunguska", a song by Cymbals Eat Guitars
- "Tunguska", a song by Darkest Hour on their album, Deliver Us
- "Tunguska", a song by Fanfarlo on their album, Rooms Filled with Light
- "Tunguska", a song by Hopesfall on their album, Arbiter
- "Tunguska", a song by Tribe After Tribe on their albums, Enchanted Entrance and Enchanted Entrance II

== Other uses ==
- 2K22 Tunguska, a Russian anti-aircraft system
- 5471 Tunguska, minor planet
- 9M311 Tunguska, a surface-to-air missile used in the Tunguska-M1 system

== See also ==
- Tungus (disambiguation)
- Tungusic (disambiguation)
