= Gora Ulun =

Mountain in Khabarovsk Krai, Russia

- Location within Russia

Highest point
- Elevation: 2,221 m (7,287 ft)
- Prominence: 0 m (0 ft)
- Coordinates: 50°30′32″N 134°19′35″E

Geography
- Location: Khabarovsk Krai, Russia
- Parent range: Badzhal Range

Gora Ulun (Russian: гора Улун, Mount Ulun) is a mountain in Khabarovsk Krai ( Eastern Siberia), Russia and officially the highest point of the Badzhal Range (Баджа́льский хребет) with an elevation of 2,221 m (7,287 ft).

== Geography ==
The Badzhal Range where the peak rises is a mountain chain with a length of approximately 220 kilometers. The mountains are quite deserted and the infrastructure is undeveloped in the area.

=== Elevations ===
The third edition of the Great Soviet Encyclopedia (GSE) listed in 1979 the range with an elevation of 2,640 m (8,660 ft), no name was mentioned for the highest mountain. The geographic volume of the GSE listed Mount Ulun with an elevation of 2,512 m (8,241 ft). After the breakdown of the Soviet Union topographic maps reduced the elevation to 2,221 m.

In 2016, climbers discovered that Gora Korol (гора Король, Mount King) might have an elevation of 2,263 m (7,425 ft). The next climbing expedition to the highest mountains of the Badzhal reported for Mount King an elevation of 2,269 m (7,444 ft) and for Mount Queen (гора Королева) nearby an elevation of 2,219 m (7,280 ft).

== See also ==
- List of mountains and hills of Russia
- Berill Mountain
