= Huma River (Heilongjiang) =

River in Heilongjiang, China

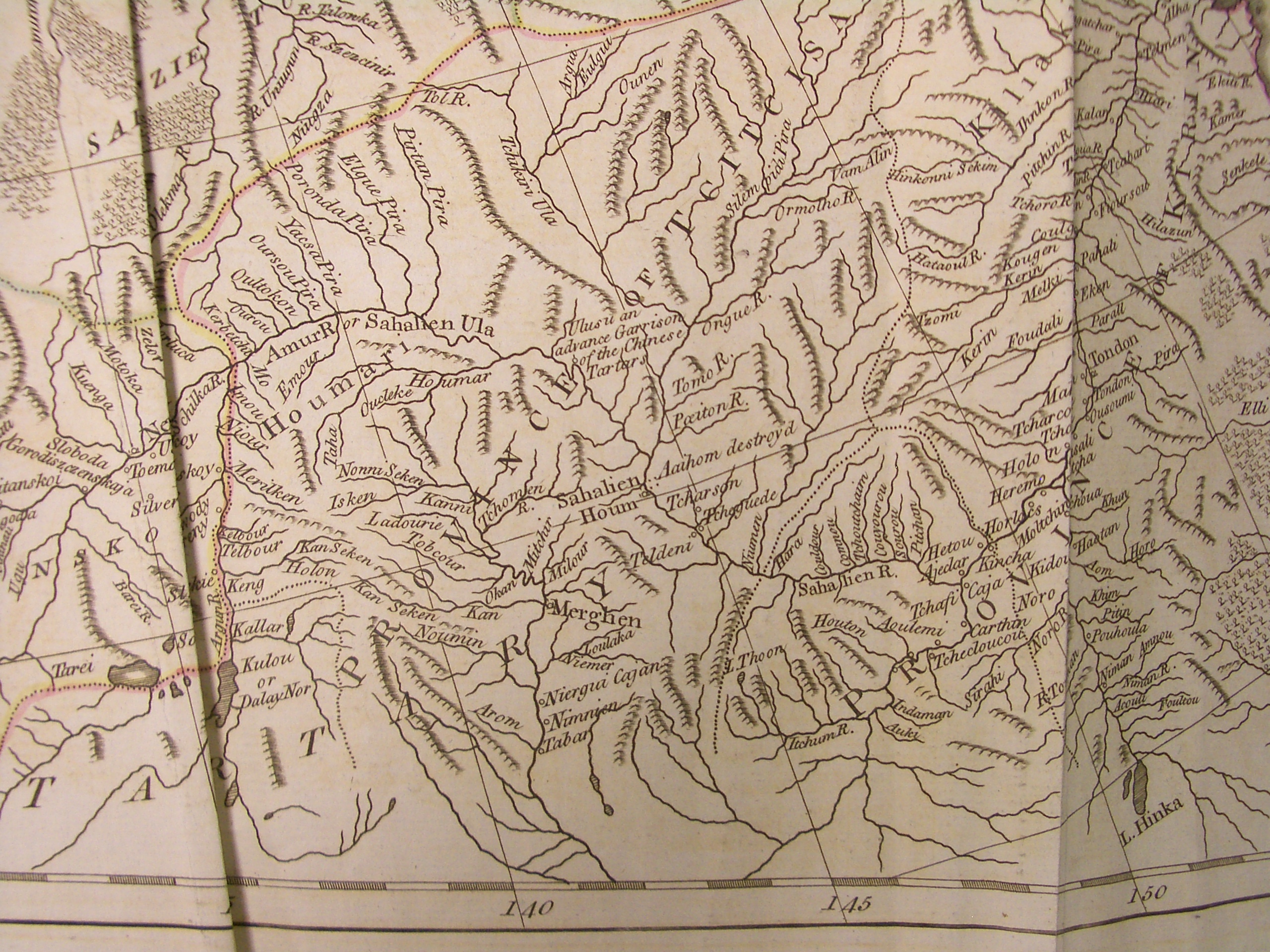
- The Huma (Houmar) River on a map from (1773), the surrounding region labeled Houmari
- Native name: 呼玛河 (Chinese), Huma he

Location
- Country: People's Republic of China
- Province: Heilongjiang
- Prefecture: Greater Khingan
- County: Huma County

Physical characteristics
- Mouth: Amur
  - coordinates: 51.6096°N 126.6816°E

Basin features
- Progression: Amur→ Sea of Okhotsk

The Huma River is a right tributary on the northern loop of the Amur River in China's province of Heilongjiang. It starts in the Greater Khingan Mountains and flows in a general eastern and south-eastern direction, parallel and southwest of the Amur, until flowing into the Amur in Huma County, about 10 km (6 mi) south of Huma County's county seat.

Somewhere near its mouth was the Russian fort of Kumarsk at the time of the Russian–Manchu border conflicts. At the time it was also called "Kamora River" or "Houmar River".
