= Urmi (river) =

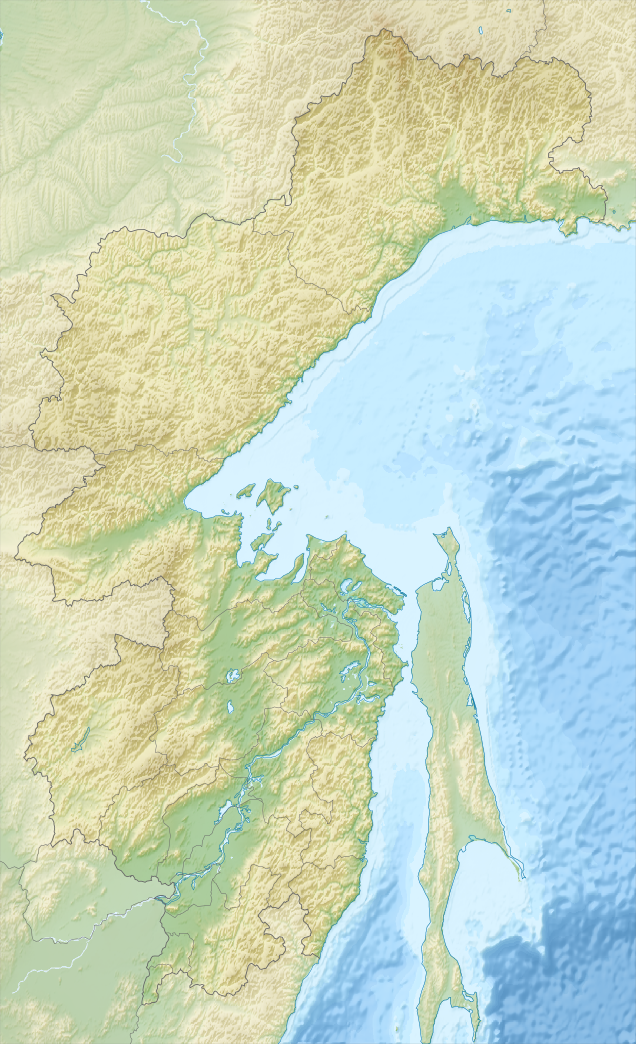
- Mouth location in Khabarovsk Krai, Russia

Location
- Country: Russia

Physical characteristics
- Mouth: Tunguska
  - coordinates: 48.7304°N 134.2831°E
- Length: 434 km (270 mi)
- Basin size: 13,700 km^{2} (5,300 sq mi)

Basin features
- Progression: Tunguska→ Amur→ Sea of Okhotsk

The Urmi (Russian: Урми) is a river in Khabarovsk Krai of Russia. It is 458 kilometres (285 mi) long and drains a basin of 15,000 square kilometres (5,800 mi^{2}). There are some 1,040 lakes in the Urmi basin; their total surface area is more than 32 square kilometres (12 mi^{2}).

The Urmi merges with the Kur to form the Tunguska, which then falls into the Amur opposite Khabarovsk.

The Urmi's source lies on the southern slopes of the Badzhal Range, from where it begins to flow adjacent to the Bureia Range. The river's lower course passes mostly through the Amur Lowland.

The Urmi depends on rain for most of its water. Its mean rate of flow is 170 cubic metres per second (6,000 cu ft/s). With the onset of winter in November, the river freezes.

The river is navigable by small craft. One particular stretch of the river, which is 260 kilometres (160 mi) long, is used to float lumber.

Basin of the Amur

== See also ==
- List of rivers of Russia
