= Bidzhan =

Location
- Country: Russia

Physical characteristics
- Source: Confluence of Pravyy Bidzhan and Levyy Bidzhan
  - coordinates: 48°32′40″N 131°17′24″E
- Mouth: Amur
  - coordinates: 47°45′07″N 132°17′22″E
- Length: 274 km (170 mi)
- Basin size: 7,940 km^{2} (3,070 sq mi)

Basin features
- Progression: Amur→ Sea of Okhotsk

The Bidzhan (Russian: Биджан) is a river in the Jewish Autonomous Oblast, Russia. Bidzhan comes from the Tungusic word "bidzen", meaning "permanent settlement"). The river is about 274 kilometres (170 mi) long, the width 30–60 m (98–197 ft) wide and 1.5–7 m (4.9–23.0 ft) deep. Bidzhan is formed by the confluence of the source rivers Pravyy Bidzhan and Levyy Bidzhan in the Lesser Khingan and runs from there from north to south and ends up flowing along the larger river Amur. Birobidzhan, the administrative center of the Jewish Autonomous Oblast, is partly named after the river.

== See also ==
- List of rivers of Russia
