= Evenkia =

Evenkia may refer to:

- Evenk Autonomous Okrug, a former federal subject of Russia
- Evenkiysky District, a district of Krasnoyarsk Krai, Russia
- 2656 Evenkia

== See also ==
- Evenki (disambiguation)
