= Tungus (disambiguation) =

Tungus may refer to:

- Tungus languages (Tungusic languages)
- Tungus peoples (Tungusic peoples)

or:

- Tungus language (Evenki language)
- Tungus people (Evenki people)

== See also ==
- Tungusic (disambiguation)
- Evenki (disambiguation)
- Tunguska (disambiguation)
