= Nanai =

Nanai may refer to:

- The Nanai people of northeastern Asia
  - Nanai language, the native language of the Nanai people
- Joshua Nanai (born 2002), New Zealand recording artist and record producer known professionally as Jawsh 685
- Nanai, Mesopotamian goddess commonly transcribed as Nanaya
