= Gur (river) =

River of Khabarovsk Krai

Gur Гур Хунгари
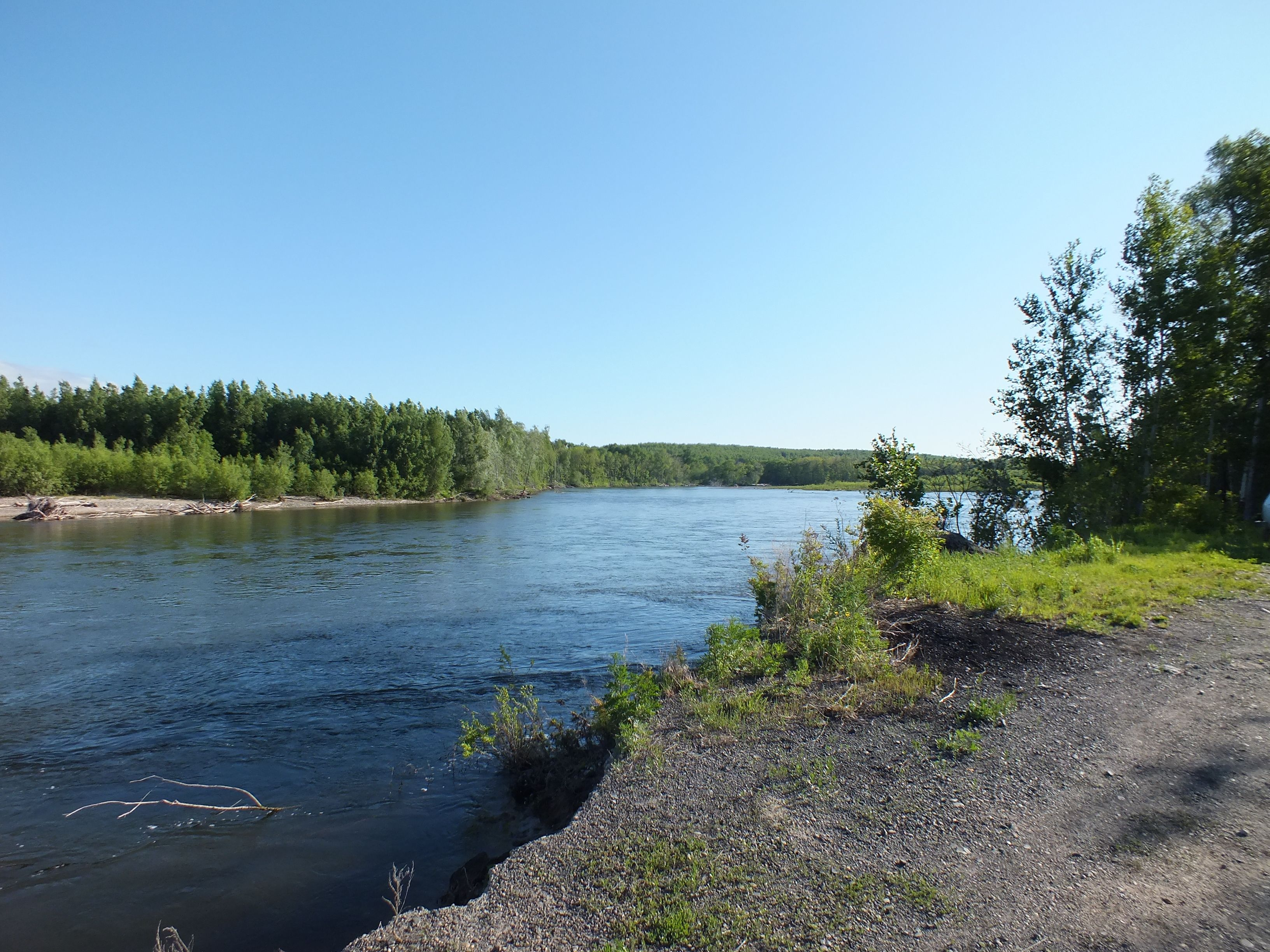
- View of the Gur

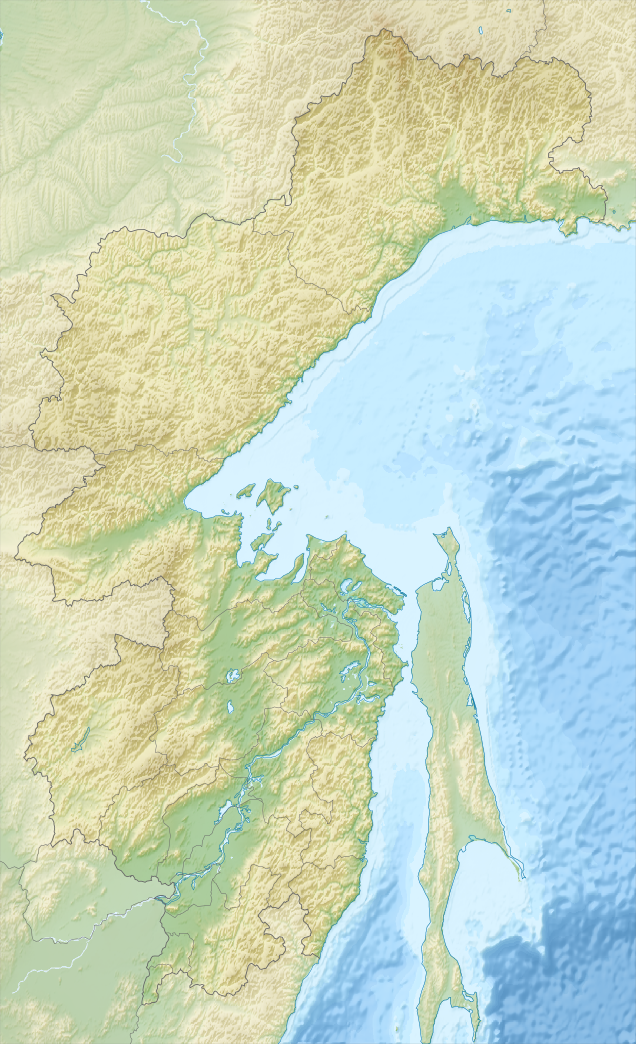
- Mouth location in Khabarovsk Krai, Russia

Location
- Country: Russia

Physical characteristics
- Source
  - location: Sikhote-Alin
  - coordinates: 49°37′47″N 139°16′04″E
  - elevation: 960 m (3,150 ft)
- Mouth: Amur
  - coordinates: 50°04′31″N 135°54′32″E
- Length: 349 km (217 mi)
- Basin size: 11,800 km^{2} (4,600 sq mi)
- Discharge
  - average: 170 m^{3}/s (6,000 cu ft/s)

Basin features
- Progression: Amur→ Sea of Okhotsk

The Gur (Russian: Гур) is a river in Khabarovsk Krai, Russia. It is the 9th longest tributary of the Amur, with a length of 349 kilometres (217 mi) and a drainage basin area of 11,800 square kilometres (4,600 mi^{2}). The river was known as "Khungari" (Хунгари) until the 1972 Renaming of geographical sites in the Russian Far East. The town of Gurskoe, as well as the villages of Kenai, Uktur and Snezhny are located by the river. Gold mining is being developed in the river basin.

The Gur Swamps (Russian: Гурское болото) are an important wetland area located on the right bank of the river in the Nanaysky District.

== Course ==
The Gur is a right tributary of the Amur. It has its sources in the slopes of the Sikhote-Alin and about two thirds of the river basin is located within the northwestern part of this mountain range. In its upper course the Gur heads roughly northwards its riverbed is largely undivided. Further downstream it bends and flows roughly towards the west. Leaving the mountains it flows in its last 100 kilometres (62 mi) stretch meandering across the mainly swampy Middle Amur Lowland.

Finally the Gur joins the Amur split in several branches 673 km (418 mi) from its mouth. The confluence is 50 km (31 mi) to the south of Komsomolsk-on-Amur.

The main tributaries of the Gur are the 86 kilometres (53 mi) long Uktur on the right, and the 88 kilometres (55 mi) long Jaur, the 74 kilometres (46 mi) long Hoso and the 87 kilometres (54 mi) long Chermal on the left.

Basin of the Amur

== Fauna ==
There are important fisheries in the Gur. Salmon species, including chum salmon and pink salmon, enter the river for spawning. In the summer the lower course of the Gur is a feeding ground for whitefish, Siberian roach, rudd, carp and catfish.

== See also ==
- List of rivers of Russia
