= Evenki =

Evenki, or Evenk may refer to:

- Evenki people (Evenks), a people of Russia and China also known as Tungus
- Evenki languages, languages of Tungusic family
  - Evenki language, a subdivision of Evenki languages, spoken by Evenks
- Evenk Autonomous Banner, a 3rd-level subdivision of Inner Mongolia, China
- Evenk Ethnic Sum, a 4th-level subdivision of Inner Mongolia, China
- Evenk Autonomous Okrug, a former subdivision of Russia's Krasnoyarsk Krai, now the Evenkiysky District

== See also ==
- Evenkia (disambiguation)
- Tungus (disambiguation)
