= Lake Udyl =

Lake in Khabarovsk Krai, Russia

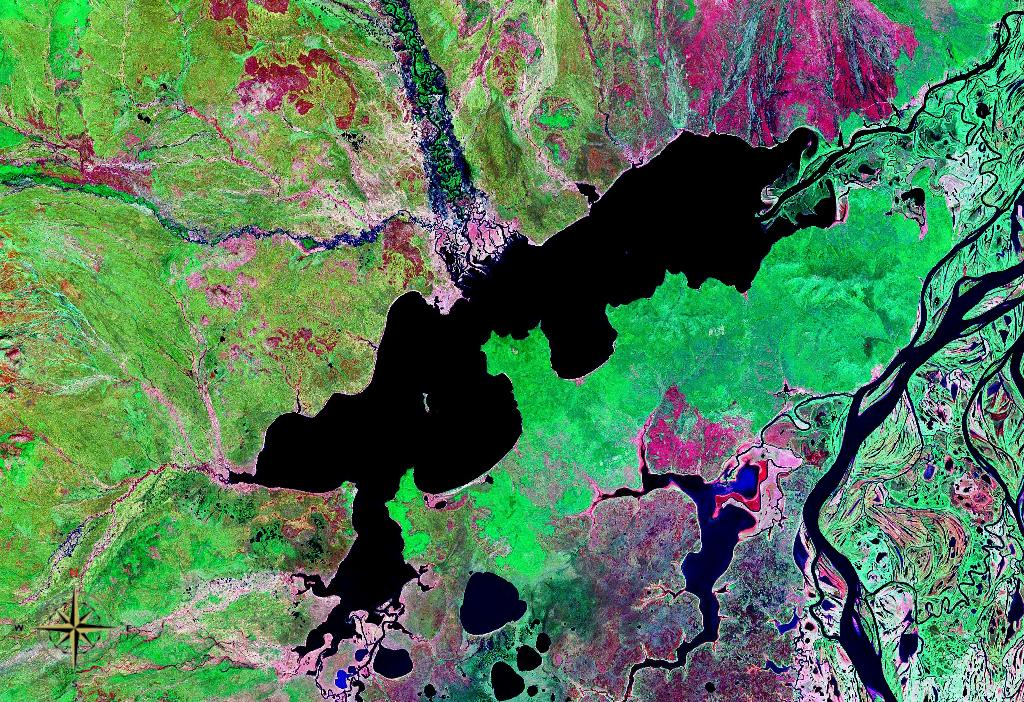
- from space (false color)

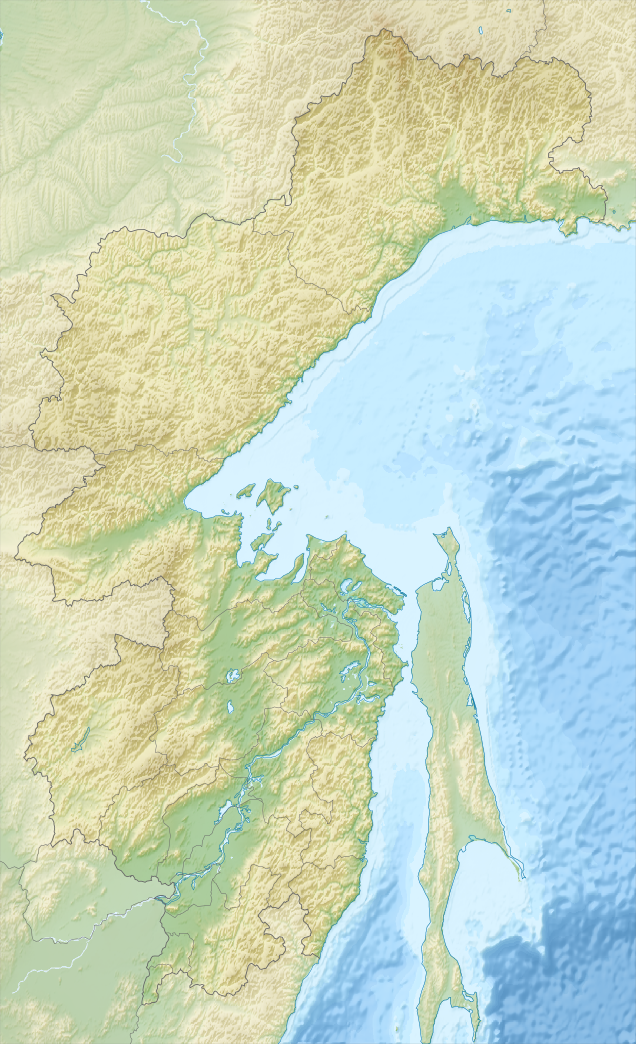
- Location within Russia Location within Khabarovsk Krai
- Location: Khabarovsk Krai
- Coordinates: 52.1305556°N 139.8413889°E
- Basin countries: Russia
- Surface area: 330 square kilometres (130 mi^{2})
- Max. depth: 5 metres (16 ft)

Ramsar Wetland
- Official name: Lake Udyl and the mouths of the Bichi, Bitki and Pilda Rivers
- Designated: 13 September 1994
- Reference no.: 687

Lake Udyl (Russian: Удыль) is a large freshwater lake in Khabarovsk Krai, Russia. It has an area of 330 square kilometres (130 mi^{2}). It is 50 miles (80 km) long and 9 kilometres (5.6 mi) wide. Maximum depth is about 5 metres (16 ft). It lies near the left bank of the Amur River.
