= Valentin Avrorin =

Russian linguist and academic (1907–1977)

Valentin Aleksandrovich Avrorin (Russian: Валентин Александрович Аврорин) (December 23 1907, Tambov - February 26 1977, Leningrad) was a Corresponding Member of the Academy of Sciences of the USSR and an expert in languages. He was outstanding in the sphere of Tungusic languages, and was one of the active creators of the Nanai written language.

== Biography ==
He was born in Tambov, Russian Empire to a family of teachers. In 1930, graduated from the Faculty of History and Ethnology of the Saint Petersburg State University.

In 1956, defended PhD in Philology.

Professor, Department of General Linguistics, Faculty of Humanities, Novosibirsk State University, the first dean of the faculty.

June 26, 1964 elected a corresponding member of the Academy of Sciences of the Soviet Union.
