= Taptugary =

Taptugary Таптугары
- Selo
- Location within Zabaykalsky Krai Location within Russia
- Coordinates: 53°41′N 120°03′E
- Country: Russia
- Region: Zabaykalsky Krai
- District: Mogochinsky District
- Time zone: UTC+9:00

Taptugary (Russian: Таптугары) is a rural locality (a selo) in Mogochinsky District, Zabaykalsky Krai, Russia. Population: 447 (2021 census); 534 (2010 census); 626 (2002 census); There are 11 streets in this selo.

== Geography ==
This rural locality is located 20 km from Mogocha (the district's administrative centre), 469 km from Chita (capital of Zabaykalsky Krai) and 5,434 km from Moscow. Medvezhy Klyuch is the nearest rural locality.
