= Sukhaya Tunguska =

Sukhaya Tunguska Сухая Тунгуска
- Village (posyolok)
- Location within Krasnoyarsk Krai Location within Russia
- Coordinates: 65°10′N 87°57′E
- Country: Russia
- Krai: Krasnoyarsk
- District: Turukhansky District
- Founded: 1805
- Founder: Sidor F. Kovalev
- Elevation: 27 m (89 ft)

Population (2010)
  - Total: 2
- Time zone: UTC+7 (KRAT)
- Postal code: 663240

Sukhaya Tunguska (Russian: Сухая Тунгуска, literally 'Dry Tunguska') is a small rural village in Turukhansky District, Krasnoyarsk Krai, Russia. It is located on the right bank of the Yenisei River near the confluence with the Sukhaya Tunguska River, approximately 69 km south of Turukhansk. As of the 2010 census, the village had only 2 inhabitants, making it one of the smallest inhabited localities in Krasnoyarsk Krai.

== History ==
Sukhaya Tunguska was founded in 1805 by Sidor Fedorovich Kovalev, a political exile from Saint Petersburg Governorate. Throughout the 19th century, it remained a small outpost inhabited by Russian settlers and served as a fishing and trading point along the Yenisei.

During World War II, a significant shipping disaster occurred near the village in autumn 1942 when a convoy of 3 powered lighters and 17 cargo barges carrying 34,800 tons of supplies became trapped in early ice on the Yenisei. Most of the cargo was lost when the barges were destroyed by ice during the 1943 spring thaw.

In 1971, geologists discovered the Sukhaya Tunguska oil field nearby, though its reserves proved modest compared to other Siberian fields. The village never developed oil industry infrastructure due to its isolation.

By the early 2000s, Sukhaya Tunguska had effectively become depopulated, with only 1-2 residents recorded in recent censuses.

== Demographics ==
Year	Population
2002	<10
2006	1
2010	2

== Government ==
In 2013, part of the Yenisei near Sukhaya Tunguska was designated as a protected river valley complex (6,050 ha) by the Turukhansky District Council.

== Notable people ==
- Sidor Kovalev - Founder of the village in 1805, political exile from Saint Petersburg
- Alexander N. Zdorov - Riverboat captain whose ship was trapped in ice near the village in 1942
