= Lake Bolon =

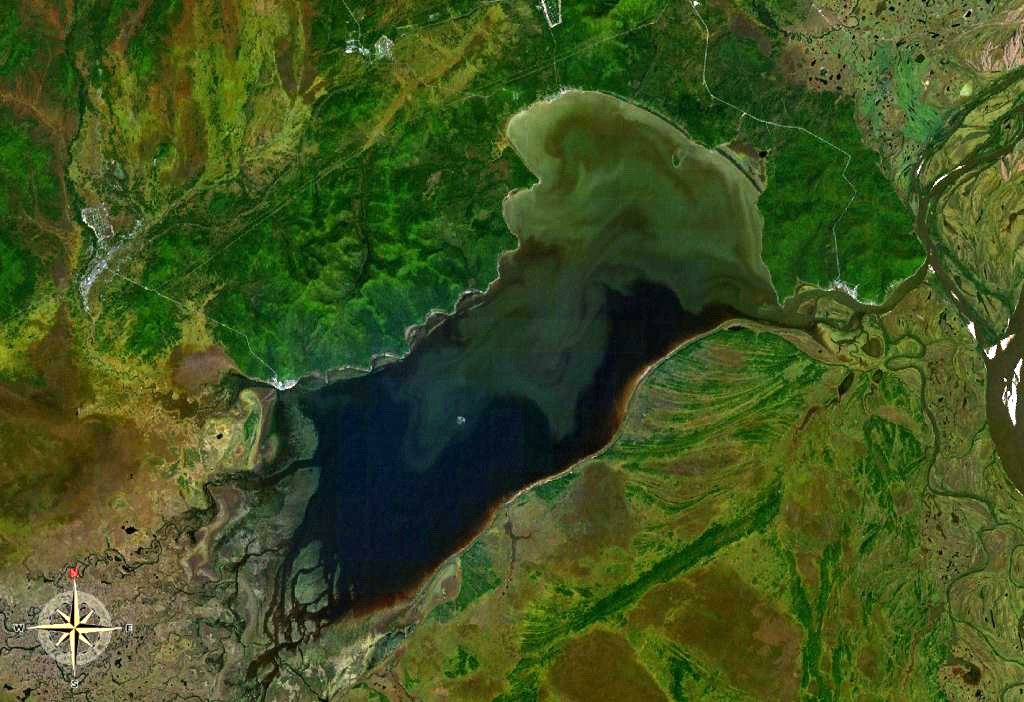
- from space

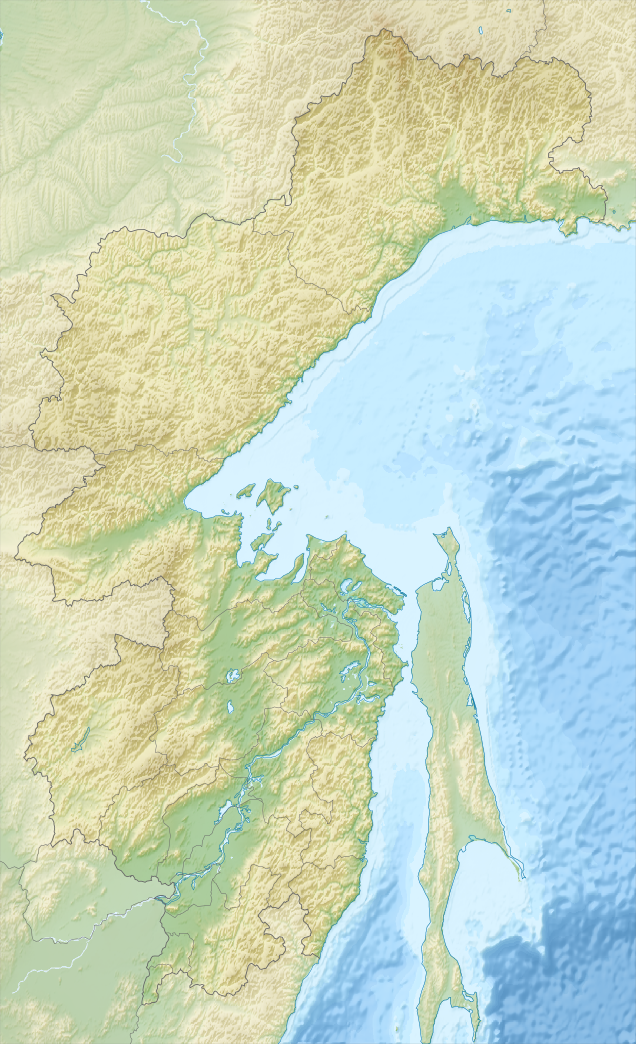
- Location within Russia Location within Khabarovsk Krai
- Location: Khabarovsk Krai, Russia
- Coordinates: 49.8°N 136.3666667°E
- Type: Floodplain lake
- Basin countries: Russia
- Max. length: 70 km (43 mi)
- Max. width: 20 km (12 mi)
- Surface area: 338 km^{2} (131 sq mi)
- Max. depth: 4 m (13 ft)

Ramsar Wetland
- Official name: Lake Bolon and the mouths of the Selgon and Simmi Rivers
- Designated: 13 September 1994
- Reference no.: 686

Lake Bolon (Russian: Болонь) is a large freshwater lake in the Khabarovsk Krai, Russia. It has an area of 338 km²; it is 70 km long and 20 km wide, and has a maximum depth of about 4 m. It is located on the broad west-bank flood plain of the Amur River about 80 km south of Komsomolsk and drains into the Amur by a 9 km channel. Lake Bolon is an important stopping place for migratory birds. The south end of the lake is a nature preserve.
