= Tunguska (Amur) =

River in Russia

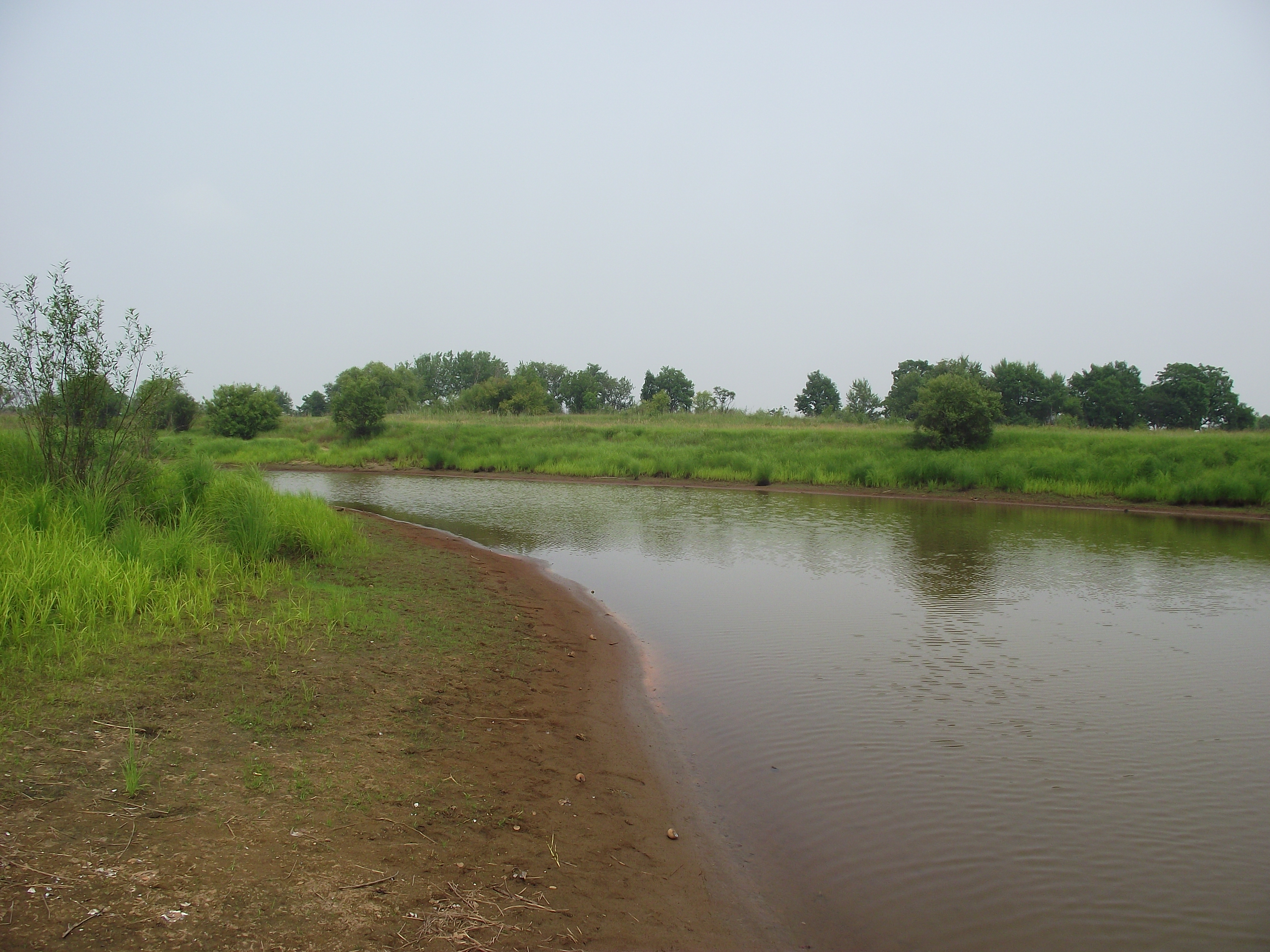

Location
- Country: Russia

Physical characteristics
- Mouth: Amur
  - coordinates: 48.6119°N 134.9995°E
- Length: 86 km (53 mi)
- Basin size: 30,200 km^{2} (11,700 sq mi)

Basin features
- Progression: Amur→ Sea of Okhotsk

The Tunguska (Russian: Тунгуска) is a river in the Khabarovsk Krai in Russia. It is a left tributary of the Amur. It is formed at the confluence of the rivers Kur and Urmi. It flows into the Amur about 15 km north of the city Khabarovsk. The Tunguska is 86 kilometres (53 mi) long, and has a drainage basin of 30,200 square kilometres (11,700 sq mi).

== See also ==
- List of rivers of Russia
- for the river associated with the Tunguska Event, see Podkamennaya Tunguska
- ″Tunguska″ disambiguation page
