= Ust-Khayryuzovo =

Settlement in Tigilsky District, Kamchatka Krai, Russia

Ust-Khayryuzovo Усть-Хайрюзово
- Interactive map of Ust-Khayryuzovo
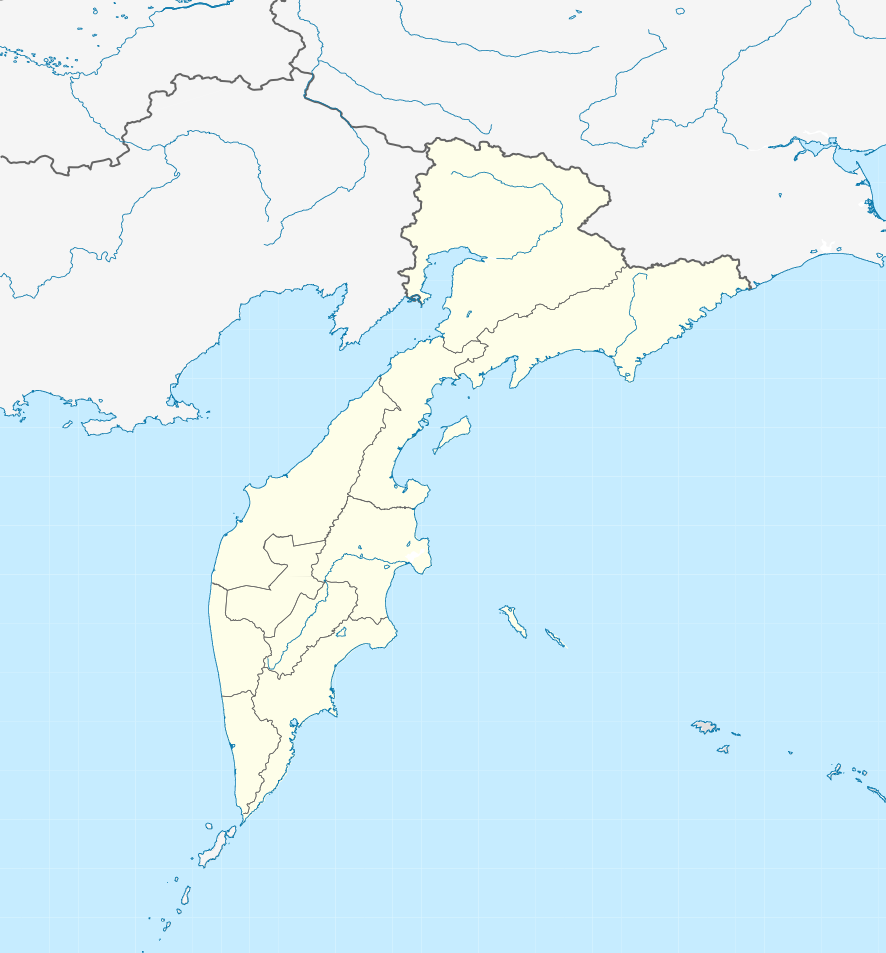
- Location of Ust-Khayryuzovo Ust-Khayryuzovo (Kamchatka Krai)
- Coordinates: 57°05′25.1″N 156°44′07.8″E
- Country: Russia
- Federal subject: Kamchatka Krai
- Founded: 1925

Government
  - Head: Aleksandr Aleksandrovich Torin

Area
  - Total: 54.95 km^{2} (21.22 sq mi)
- Elevation: 2 m (6.6 ft)

Population
  - Estimate (2021): 778 )
- Time zone: UTC+12 (MSK+9)
- Postal code: 688610
- OKTMO ID: 30832407101
- Website: ust-hayruzovo.ru

Ust-Khayryuzovo (Russian: Усть-Хайрюзово, lit. 'Estuary-Khayryuzovo') is a rural settlement located in Tigilsky District, Koryak Okrug, Kamchatka Krai, Russia. It is located at the mouth of the Khayryuzovo River, which is its namesake.

== Geography ==
Ust-Khayryuzovo is located on the western coast of the Kamchatka Peninsula, on the Sea of Okhotsk. It is located approximately 466km from Petropavlovsk-Kamchatsky, and approximately 6,349km from Moscow.

== Government ==
The government is made up of the head (Aleksandr Aleksandrovich Torin), and the council of deputies. All elected official serve four year terms.

Members of the Council of Deputies
Name	Position
Konstantin Konstantinovich Shipovalov	Council President
Natalia Ivanovna Bonar	Councillor
Lyudmila Georgievna Kosmina	Councillor
Valentina Vladimirovna Muntyan	Councillor
Vladimir Andreevich Ovchinnikov	Councillor
Andrian Vitalevich Petrukhin	Councillor
Alexey Borisovich Slepov	Councillor
Valeriy Sergeevich Shuldeshov	Councillor
Yelena Vladimirovna Sharova	Councillor
Alona Mikhailovna Guseynova	Councillor

== Climate ==
The climate of Ust-Khayryuzovo is subarctic, or Dsc under the Köppen climate classification.

Climate data for Ust-Khayryuzovo
Month	Jan	Feb	Mar	Apr	May	Jun	Jul	Aug	Sep	Oct	Nov	Dec	Year
Record high °C (°F)	7 (45)	8.6 (47.5)	9.7 (49.5)	17.2 (63.0)	25.5 (77.9)	27.5 (81.5)	29.3 (84.7)	28.7 (83.7)	23 (73)	18.4 (65.1)	12.4 (54.3)	10.3 (50.5)	29.3 (84.7)
Mean daily maximum °C (°F)	−8.8 (16.2)	−8.6 (16.5)	−4.2 (24.4)	0.9 (33.6)	7.4 (45.3)	12.8 (55.0)	16.3 (61.3)	16.1 (61.0)	12.7 (54.9)	6.1 (43.0)	−1.3 (29.7)	−6.7 (19.9)	3.6 (38.4)
Daily mean °C (°F)	−12.8 (9.0)	−12.9 (8.8)	−8.7 (16.3)	−2.8 (27.0)	3.3 (37.9)	8.5 (47.3)	12.4 (54.3)	12.5 (54.5)	8.8 (47.8)	2.8 (37.0)	−4.3 (24.3)	−10.5 (13.1)	−0.3 (31.4)
Mean daily minimum °C (°F)	−17.1 (1.2)	−17.4 (0.7)	−13.4 (7.9)	−6.5 (20.3)	−0.1 (31.8)	5.0 (41.0)	9.2 (48.6)	9.5 (49.1)	5.4 (41.7)	−0.1 (31.8)	−7.5 (18.5)	−14.7 (5.5)	−4.0 (24.8)
Record low °C (°F)	−42.3 (−44.1)	−40.3 (−40.5)	−38 (−36)	−29.7 (−21.5)	−14.5 (5.9)	−3.2 (26.2)	0.4 (32.7)	−2.5 (27.5)	−6.3 (20.7)	−14.2 (6.4)	−30.3 (−22.5)	−35.4 (−31.7)	−42.3 (−44.1)
Average precipitation mm (inches)	15.1 (0.59)	15.1 (0.59)	19.1 (0.75)	17.0 (0.67)	30.1 (1.19)	41.6 (1.64)	50.1 (1.97)	82.6 (3.25)	81.5 (3.21)	76.7 (3.02)	63.0 (2.48)	28.5 (1.12)	520.4 (20.48)
Source: Pogodaiklimat.ru
