= Amur =

Major river in the Russian Far East and Northeast Asia

Amur Heilong
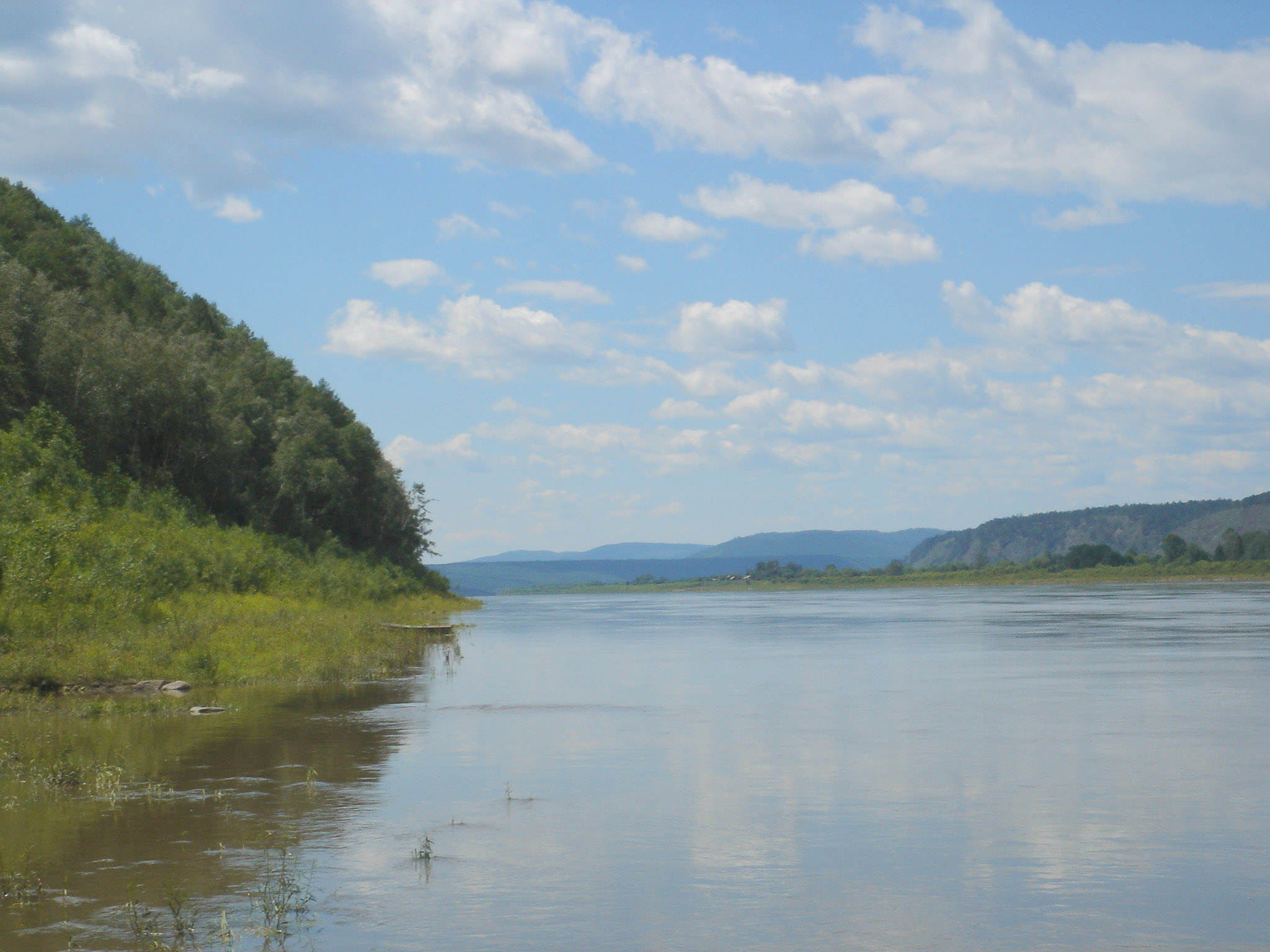

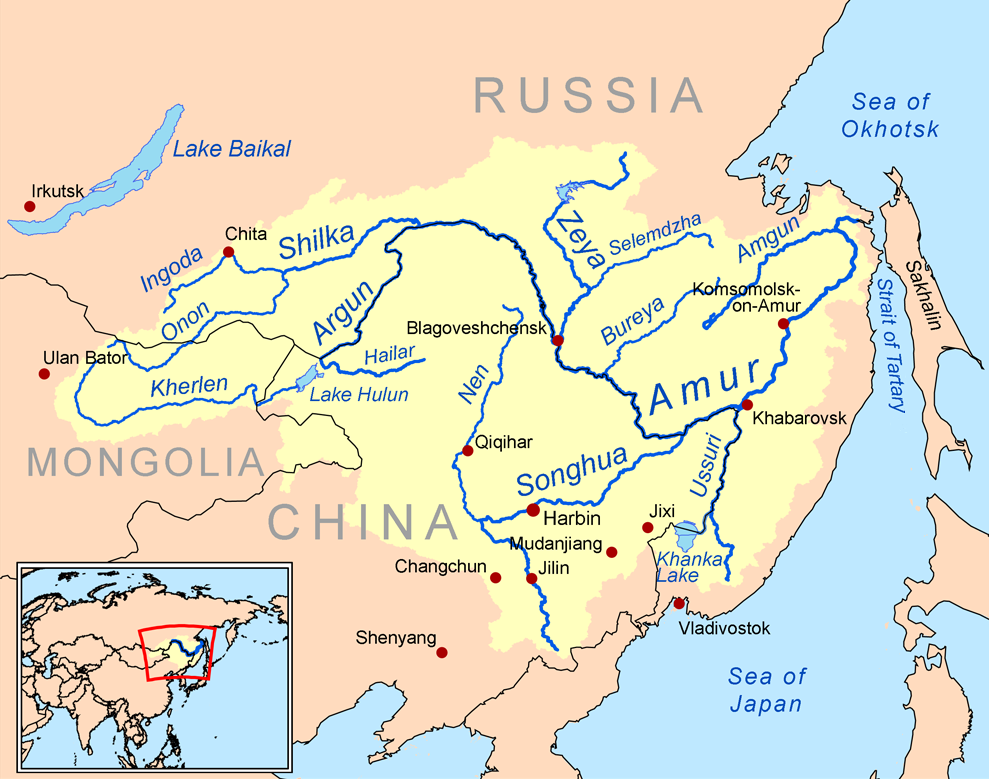
- Map of the Amur watershed
- Etymology: From Mongolian: amar ("rest")

Location
- Countries: Russia; China
- Cities: Blagoveshchensk; Heihe; Tongjiang; Khabarovsk; Amursk; Komsomolsk-on-Amur; Nikolayevsk-on-Amur

Physical characteristics
- Source: Onon-Shilka
  - location: Khan Khentii Strictly Protected Area, Khentii Province, Mongolia
  - coordinates: 48°48′59″N 108°46′13″E
  - elevation: 2,045 m (6,709 ft)
- 2nd source: Argun
  - location: Greater Khingan, Hulunbuir, China
  - coordinates: 49.937°N 122.465°E
- Source confluence
  - location: Near Pokrovka, Russia
  - coordinates: 53°19′58″N 121°28′37″E
  - elevation: 303 m (994 ft)
- Mouth: Strait of Tartary
  - location: Near Nikolayevsk-on-Amur, Khabarovsk Krai, Russia
  - coordinates: 52°56′50″N 141°05′02″E
  - elevation: 0 m (0 ft)
- Length: 2,824 km (1,755 mi) (Amur–Argun–Hailar: 4,444 km)
- Basin size: 1,855,000 km^{2} (716,000 sq mi) 2,129,700 km^{2} (822,300 mi^{2})(with undrained areas)
- Width
  - maximum: 5,000 m (16,000 ft)
- Depth
  - maximum: 57 m (187 ft)
- Discharge
  - location: Near mouth
  - average: (Period: 2002–2020)12,360 m^{3}/s (390 km^{3}/a) (Period: 1896–2004)11,330 m^{3}/s (400,000 cu ft/s)
- Discharge
  - location: Bogorodskoye
  - average: (Period: 2008–2019)11,459 m^{3}/s (404,700 cu ft/s) (Period: 1896–2004) 10,100 m^{3}/s (360,000 cu ft/s)
- Discharge
  - location: Komsomolsk-on-Amur
  - average: (Period: 2012–2019)10,259 m^{3}/s (362,300 cu ft/s)
- Discharge
  - location: Khabarovsk
  - average: (Period: 2008–2018)8,384 m^{3}/s (296,100 cu ft/s) (Period: 1896–2004)8,360 m^{3}/s (295,000 cu ft/s)
- Discharge
  - location: Blagoveshchensk
  - average: (Period: 1971–2000)2,859.1 m^{3}/s (100,970 cu ft/s)

Basin features
- Progression: Strait of Tartary (Sea of Okhotsk)
- River system: Amur River
- Tributaries
  - left: Shilka, Amazar, Oldoy, Zeya, Bureya, Arkhara, Bidzhan, Bira, Tunguska, Bolon, Gorin, Bichi, Amgun, Palvinskaya
  - right: Argun, Emuer, Huma, Xun, Kuerbin, Songhua, Nongjiang, Ussuri, Sita, Nemta, Anyuy, Gur, Yai

Amur

Russian name
- Russian: река Амур

Chinese name
- Simplified Chinese: 黑龙江
- Traditional Chinese: 黑龍江
- Postal: Heilung Kiang
- Literal meaning: "Black Dragon River"
Transcriptions
Standard Mandarin
- Hanyu Pinyin: Hēilóng Jiāng
- Gwoyeu Romatzyh: Heilong Jiang
- Wade–Giles: Hei^{1}-lung^{2} Chiang^{1}
- IPA: [xéɪ.lʊ̌ŋ.tɕjáŋ]
Wu
- Romanization: Ha^{平} lon^{上} kaon^{平}
Yue: Cantonese
- Yale Romanization: Hāak-lùhng Gōng
- Jyutping: Haak^{1}-lung^{4} Gong^{1}
- IPA: [hak̚˥.lʊŋ˩.kɔŋ˥]
Southern Min
- Tâi-lô: Hik-lîng Kang

Manchu name
- Manchu script: ᠰᠠᡥᠠᠯᡳᠶᠠᠨ ᡠᠯᠠ
- Romanization: Sahaliyan ula

The Amur River (Russian: река Амур, romanized: reka Amur) or Heilong River (simplified Chinese: 黑龙江; traditional Chinese: 黑龍江) is a perennial river in Northeast Asia, forming the natural border between the Russian Far East and Northeast China (historically the Outer and Inner Manchuria). The Amur proper is 2,824 km (1,755 mi) long, and has a drainage basin of 1,855,000 km^{2} (716,000 mi^{2}). If including its main stem tributary, the Argun, the Amur is 4,444 km (2,761 mi) long, making it the world's tenth longest river.

The Amur is an important river for the aquatic fauna of Northeast Asia. The river basin is home to a variety of large predatory fish such as northern snakehead, Amur pike, taimen, Amur catfish, predatory carp and yellowcheek, as well as several species of trout and anadromous salmonids. The largest fish species in the Amur is the kaluga, a sturgeon that is one of the largest freshwater fish in the world, attaining a length as great as 5.6 m (18 ft). The Amur is also home to the northernmost populations of the Amur softshell turtle and Indian lotus.

== Name ==
The etymology of the name Amur is unknown. One theory dictates that it entered into Russian through either the Evenki word amur or the Even word amar, both meaning "river" in their respective Tungusic languages. However, it is unclear whether Russian borrowed the name Amur from either Tungusic language rather than the other way around. An alternative theory suggests that Amur comes from mur, the word in Dagur, one of the Mongolic languages, for "big river".

Its ancient Chinese names were Yushui, Wanshui and Heishui, with the latter name, meaning "black water", being the basis of the modern Chinese name Heilongjiang or "Black Dragon River", while the Manchurian name Sahaliyan Ula, the Mongolian names "Amar mörön" (Cyrillic: Амар мөрөн) originates from the name "Amar" meaning to rest and Khar mörön (Cyrillic: Хар мөрөн) meaning Black River.

== Course ==
The river rises in the hills in the western part of Northeast China at the confluence of its two major affluents, the Shilka and the Argun (or Ergune), at an elevation of 303 metres (994 ft). It flows east forming the border between China and Russia, and slowly makes a great arc to the southeast for about 400 kilometres (250 mi), receiving many tributaries and passing many small towns. At Huma, it is joined by a major tributary, the Huma He. Afterwards it continues to flow south until, between the cities of Blagoveshchensk in Russia and Heihe in China, it widens significantly as it is joined by one of its most important tributaries the Zeya.

The Amur arcs to the east and turns southeast again at the confluence with the Bureya, then does not receive another significant tributary for nearly 250 kilometres (160 mi) before its confluence with its largest tributary, the Songhua, at Tongjiang. At the confluence with the Songhua the river turns northeast, now flowing towards Khabarovsk, where it joins the Ussuri and ceases to define the Russia–China border. Now the river spreads out dramatically into a braided character, flowing north-northeast through a wide valley in eastern Russia, passing Amursk and Komsomolsk-on-Amur. The valley narrows after about 200 kilometres (120 mi) and the river again flows north onto plains at the confluence with the Amgun. Shortly after, the Amur turns sharply east and into an estuary at Nikolayevsk-on-Amur, about 20 kilometres (12 mi) downstream of which it flows into the Strait of Tartary.

During years with heavy precipitation, the Amur river system is connected with the Kherlen river. The normally exit−less endorheic lake Hulun Lake, into which Kherlen flows, will overflow at its northern shore through the arroyo of Mutnaya Protoka, and the water will meet the Argun River (Ergune) after about 30 kilometres (19 mi). The Amur Basin of the Kherlen−Argun−Amur River system has a total length of 5,052 km (3,139 mi) to its river mouth on the Sea of Okhotsk.

== Tributaries ==
The largest tributaries of the Amur are, from source to mouth:

- Argun (right)
- Shilka (left)
- Amazar (left)
- Oldoy (left)
- Huma (right)
- Zeya (left)
- Bureya (left)
- Songhua (right)
- Bira (left)
- Ussuri (right)
- Tunguska (left)
- Anyuy (right)
- Gur (right)
- Gorin (left)
- Amgun (left)

There are also numerous lakes in the floodplain of the Amur. Some of the largest ones are Bolon, Khummi and Udyl.

The main tributaries from the mouth:

Left tributary	Right tributary	Length (km)	Basin size (km^{2})	Average discharge (m^{3}/s)
Amur (Heilongjiang)		4,444	2,129,700	12,791
Lower Amur
Protoka Palvinskaya		34	6,675.4	75.7
Amgun		723	54,602.6	660
	Akcha	58	987.7	11.1
Protoka Ukhta–Bichi		336	12,910.2	46.2
	Poto	22	845.7	5.8
	Kadi	52	645.9	7.6
	Yai	118	3,865.4	28.8
Limuri		168	4,125.3	16.4
	Salasu	68	1,205	6.9
Pisuy		59	856.2	2.7
	Machtovaya	103	1,477.2	15.4
Gorin		390	21,953.6	150
Silinka		78	974.1	6.4
Bolin		43	1,219.8	14.1
	Gur	349	11,635.4	226.3
Elban		99	1,756.8	27
Bolon–Harpi		239	13,129.7	245.6
	Gili	22	1,328	25.1
	Khoydur	41	571.2	11.7
	Anyuy	393	12,528.7	298.4
	Pikhtsa	90	872.9	19.1
	Khar	66	1,307.3	28
	Nemta (Neptu)	230	6,290	143.5
	Sita (Strelka)	105	3,315.4	67.4
Levaya			421.4	9.9
Darga		50	1,628	36.8
Tunguska–Urmi		544	30,070.2	595.6
	Ussuri (Wusulijiang)	897	195,047.4	1,620
Middle Amur
Krestovaya		70	1,361.2	18.6
	Nongjiang		4,469.9	30.1
Petrovskaya		62	996.8	11.4
Bira		424	9,279.1	84.2
Malaya Bira		150	1,946	13
	Penghua		2,740.5	13.6
Solonechnaya		52	963.4	4.7
	Sungari (Songhua)	1,927	552,629.8	2,591
	Wanyan	163.9	1,815.1	9
Bidzhan		274	7,335.9	46.2
Dobraya		58	1,996.6	10.7
Samara		105	1,560.7	9.2
Pompeyevka		71	635.6	3.9
	Jiayin		2,109.1	12.3
	Wulaga		1,213.5	7
Khingan		93	2,012.6	13.3
Uril		105	1,160.4	7.1
	Jielie		1,005.6	5.7
	Wuyun		2,239.4	12
Arkhara		155	8,643.4	82.1
Bureya		739	70,141.2	932
Raychikha		97	760	3.8
Kupriyanikha		55	689	3.4
	Kuerbin	221	5,826.2	22.2
	Xun (Hsünho)		15,624.8	62.6
Zavitaya		262	2,835.1	13.7
Dim			1,348	6.5
Topkocha		44	978.8	4.5
Gilchin		90	1,492.7	6.7
	Gongbiela	38.8	2,678.5	10.9
Manga (Big Alim)		58	733.1	3.4
	Shijin		759	3.2
Zeya		1,232	232,076.5	1,807
Upper Amur
	Fabiela		2,916.9	11.2
	Fanqniuhe		747.8	2.9
Guran		55	781.3	3
	Kuanhe		2,159	6.7
Belaya		77	1,069.7	3.7
Bereya		146	2,013.5	6.3
	Huma	542	31,029.4	130
Belaya		102	1,176.8	3.6
Ulmin		67	985.8	3.2
Borya (Onon)		14	1,109.5	3.6
Gerbelik (Herbelic)		43	702.6	2.4
Olga		158	2,905.3	10.1
Burinda		80	2,371.4	7.7
	Xiergenqi		3,807.6	12.5
	Pangu	165	3,631.5	11.4
Osezinha		84	1,129.8	3.6
	Emuer	469	16,106.1	46.2
Bolshoy Never		134	2,211.1	7.1
Oldoy		287	9,878.2	38.3
Urusha		200	3,442.3	13.4
Omutnaya		171	2,163.1	7.6
Urka		161	1,897.3	6.9
Amazar		290	11,031	37.9
Shilka ^{(1)}		555	206,000	571.1
	Argun (Erguna) ^{(2)}	944	300,977	408.5
Argun main tributaries
	Enhehada		2,130.8	4.5
Gazimur		592	12,047.5	32.4
Budyumkan		91	1,410.4	2.8
Uryumkan		226	4,337.5	9.3
	Wumahe (Uma)		1,817.3	3.8
Urov		290	4,288.8	10.3
	Abahe (Aba)		2,383	5.2
	Jiliu	468	15,771.7	47.2
	Moridaga		2,664.2	7
Nizhnyaya Borzya			1,793.2	5.2
Srednyaya Borzya		118	1,632.2	4.3
Verkhnyaya Borzya		153	4,028.8	10.7
Urulyunguy		189	8,924.1	17.9
	Derbur		6,779.3	17.7
	Genhe (Kenho)	400	15,787.8	58.1
Dalan Orom (Xinkai)–Kherlen ^{(3)}		1,284	140,000	40.7
	Hailar	555	54,800	139.1
Hailar main tributaries
	Morgele	319	4,936.4	12.4
Yimin		360	21,332.1	39.6
Moheri Tugaole			956.1	3.1
	Teni		1,401.8	4.3
Miandu			6,659.8	28
	Kudur		3,461.6	13.7
Dayan (Hailar)		121	3,325.4	13
Endorheic basin
Ulz		420	35,000	7.7

^{(1)}Amur–Shilka–Onon: 4,354 km; ^{(2)}Amur–Argun–Hailar–Dayan: 4,444 km; ^{(3)}Amur–Argun–Dalan Orom–Kherlen: 5,052 km;

== History and context ==
Many historical references distinguish two geopolitical entities in the area of the Amur: Manchuria (Northeast China) and Outer Manchuria. The Chinese province of Heilongjiang on the south bank of the river takes its name from the river, as does the Russian Amur Oblast on the north bank. The native Manchu people and their Qing Empire of China, who regarded this river as sacred, use the name Sahaliyan Ula (Black River).

The Amur is an important symbol of, and geopolitical factor in, Chinese–Russian relations. The Amur became especially prominent in the period of the Sino–Soviet political split of 1956–1966.

For many centuries, inhabitants of the Amur Valley comprised the Tungusic (Evenki, Solon, Ducher, Jurchen, Nanai, Ulch), Mongol (Daur) people, some Ainu and, near its mouth, the Nivkhs. For many of these groups, fishing in the Amur and its tributaries was the main source of their livelihood. Until the 17th century, those peoples were not known to Europeans, and little known to the Han Chinese, who sometimes collectively described them as the Wild Jurchens. The Chinese-language term Yúpí Dázi 魚皮韃子 ("Fish-skin Tatars") came to apply to the Nanais and related groups as well, owing to their traditional clothes made of fish skins.

The Mongols, ruling the region as the Yuan dynasty, established a tenuous military presence on the lower Amur in the 13th and the 14th centuries; ruins of a Yuan-era temple have been excavated near the village of Tyr.

During the early-15th-century reigns of the Yongle and the Xuande Emperors, the Ming dynasty reached the Amur in their drive to establish control over the lands adjacent to the Ming Empire to the northeast, which would later become known as Manchuria. Expeditions headed by the eunuch Yishiha reached Tyr several times between 1411 and the early 1430s, re-building (twice) the Yongning Temple and obtaining at least the nominal allegiance of the lower Amur's tribes to the Ming government. Some sources report also a Chinese presence during the same period on the middle Amur – a fort existed at Aigun for about 20 years during the Yongle era on the left (northwestern) shore of the Amur downstream from the mouth of the Zeya River. This Ming Dynasty Aigun was located on the opposite bank to the later Aigun that was later relocated during the Qing Dynasty. In any event, the Ming presence on the Amur was as short-lived as it was tenuous; soon after the end of the Yongle era, the Ming dynasty's frontiers retreated to southern Manchuria.

Chinese cultural and religious influence such as Chinese New Year, the "Chinese god", Chinese motifs like the dragon, spirals, scrolls, and material goods like agriculture, husbandry, heating, iron cooking-pots, silk, and cotton spread among Amur natives such as the Udeghes, Ulchis, and Nanais.

Russian Cossack expeditions led by Vassili Poyarkov and Yerofey Khabarov explored the Amur and its tributaries in 1643-44 and 1649-51, respectively. From 1640s to 1680s the Cossacks collected tribute from local peoples. They also established the fort of Albazin on the upper Amur.

At the time, the Manchus were busy with conquering China; but a few decades later, during the Kangxi era of 1661–1722, they turned their attention to their north-Manchurian backyard. Aigun was re-established near the supposed Ming site in about 1683–84, and a military expeditions went upstream to dislodge the Russians, whose Albazin establishment deprived the Manchu rulers of the tribute of sable pelts that the Solons and Daurs of the area would supply otherwise. Albazin fell during a short military campaign in 1685. The Treaty of Nerchinsk, concluded in 1689, marked the end of the hostilities: it left the entire Amur valley, from the convergence of the Shilka and the Ergune downstream, in Chinese hands.

Fedor Soimonov was commissioned in 1753 to map the then little explored area of the Amur, the actual expedition taking place in 1757. He mapped the Shilka, which was partly in Chinese territory, but was turned back when he reached its confluence with the Argun. The Russian proselytization of Orthodox Christianity to the indigenous peoples along the Amur was viewed as a threat by the Qing.

The Amur region remained a relative backwater of the Qing Empire for the next century and a half, with Aigun being practically the only major town on the river. Russians reappeared on the river in the mid-19th century, which forced the Manchus to yield all lands north of the river to the Russian Empire by the Treaty of Aigun (1858). Lands east of the Ussuri and the lower Amur were acquired by Russia as well, by the Convention of Peking (1860).

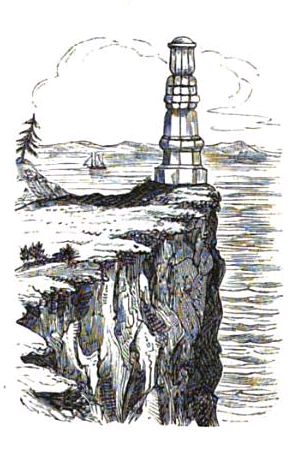
A remnant of Yishiha's monuments at Tyr c. 1860

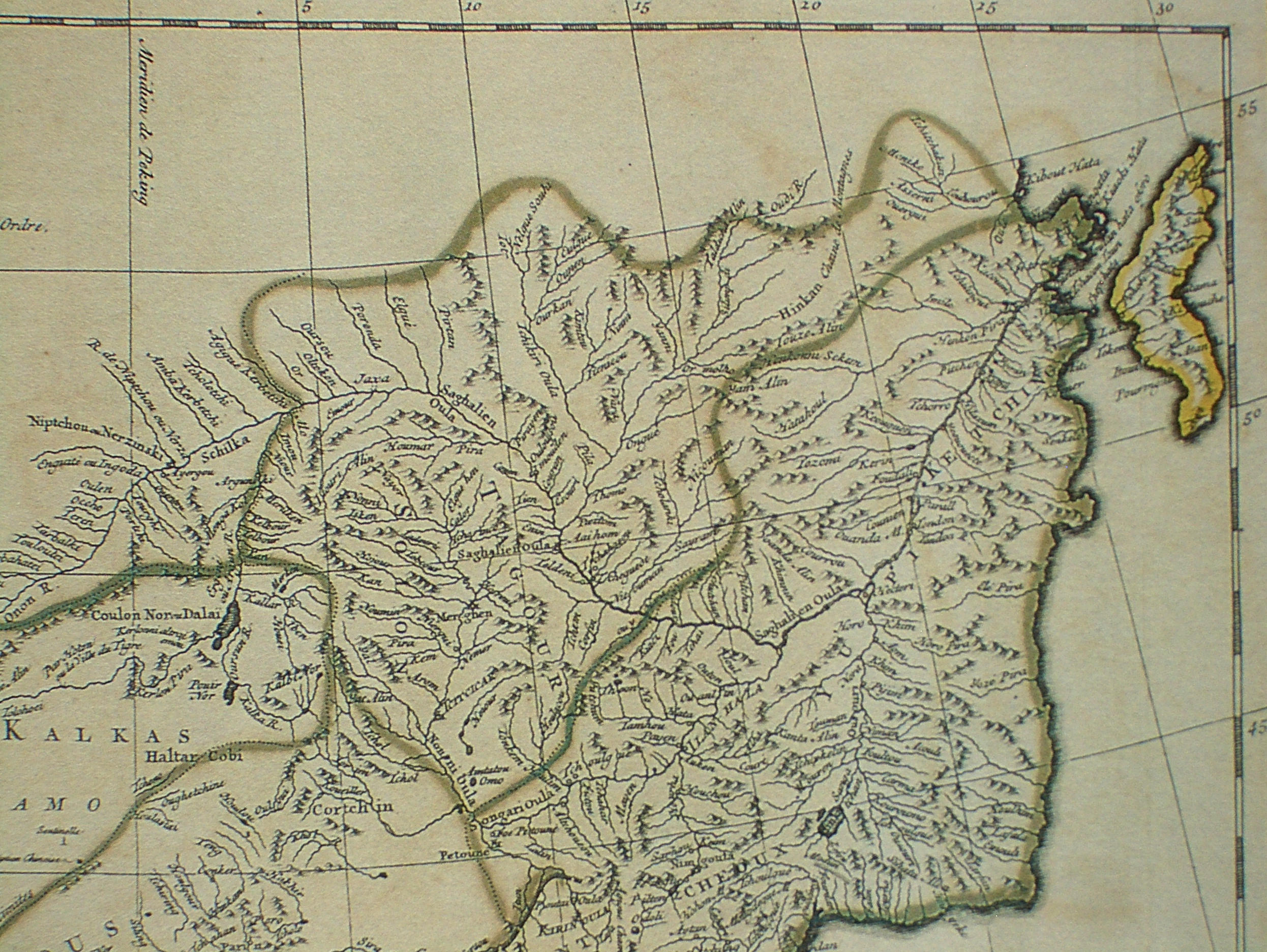
The Amur (under its Manchu name, Saghalien Oula) and its tributaries on a 1734 map by Jean Baptiste Bourguignon d'Anville, based upon maps of Jesuits in China. Albazin is shown as Jaxa, the old (Ming) site of Aigun as Aihom and the later, Qing Aigun, as Saghalien Oula.

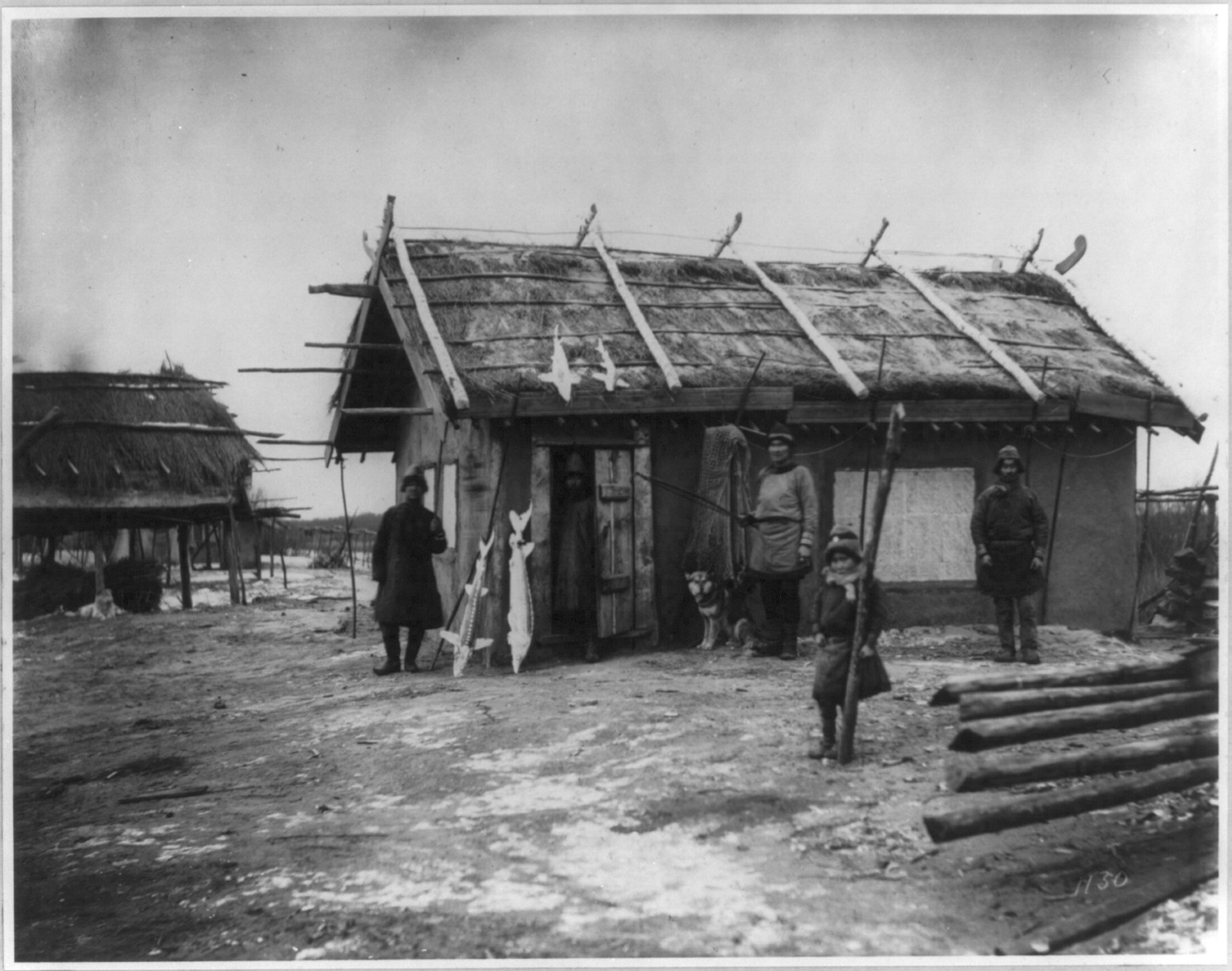
Nanai village along the Amur, north of Khabarovsk, 1895

== Bridges and tunnels ==
Amur
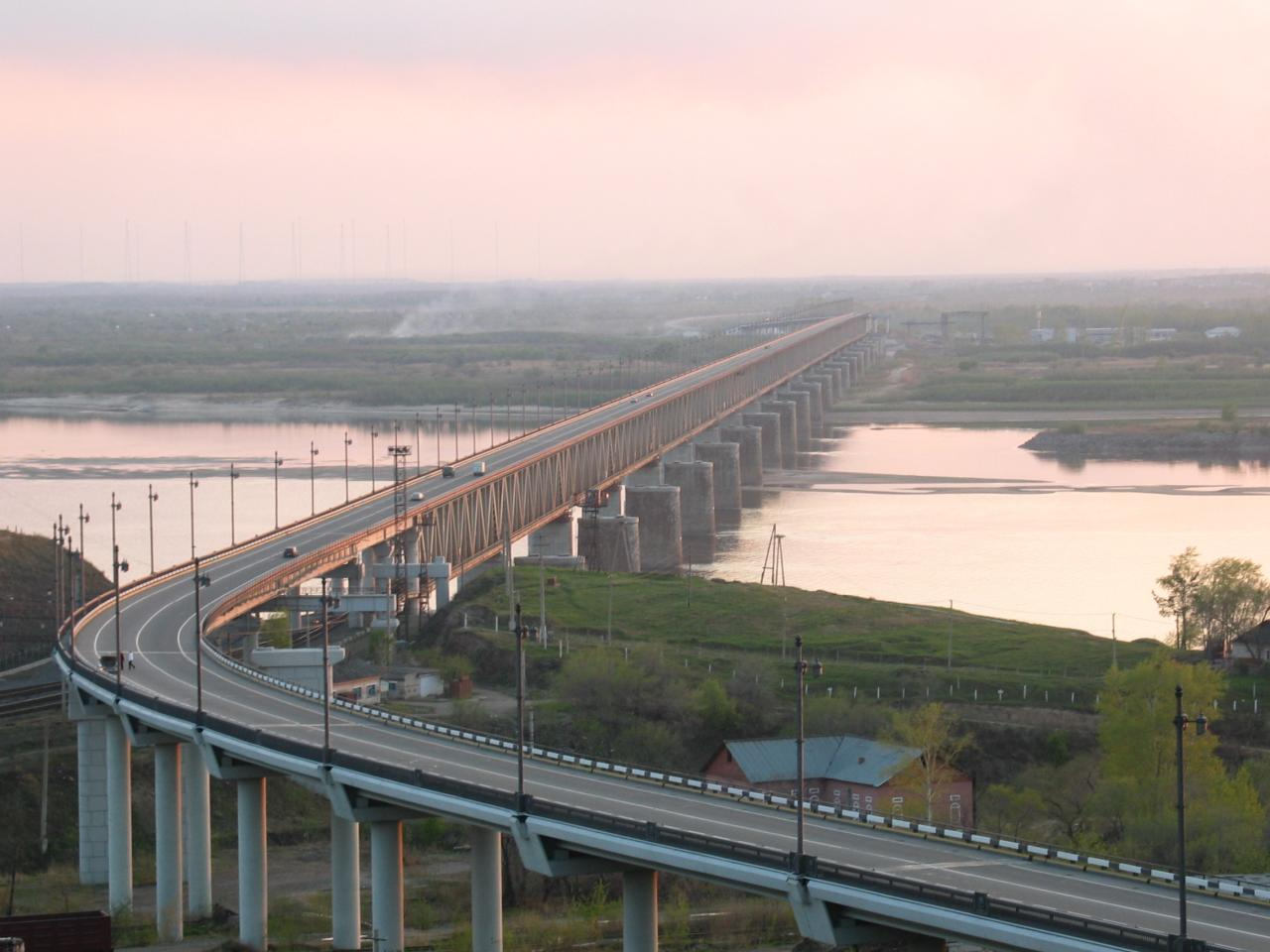
- Khabarovsk Bridge across the Amur used to be the longest in Imperial Russia and Eurasia.

Chinese name
- Traditional Chinese: 黑龍江
- Simplified Chinese: 黑龙江
- Literal meaning: "Black Dragon River"
Transcriptions
Standard Mandarin
- Hanyu Pinyin: Hēilóng Jiāng

Alternative Chinese name
- Traditional Chinese: 阿穆爾河
- Simplified Chinese: 阿穆尔河
Transcriptions
Standard Mandarin
- Hanyu Pinyin: Āmù'ěr Hé

Mongolian name
- Mongolian Cyrillic: Хар Мөрөн / Амар Мөрөн
Transcriptions
- SASM/GNC: Khar Mörön ("black river") or Amar Mörön ("rest")

Manchu name
- Manchu script: ᠰᠠᡥᠠᠯᡳᠶᠠᠨ ᡠᠯᠠ
- Romanization: Sahaliyan Ula

Russian name
- Russian: Амур
- Romanization: Amur

The first permanent bridge across the Amur, the Khabarovsk Bridge with an overall length of 2,590 metres (8,500 ft), was completed in 1916, allowing the trains on the Trans-Siberian Railway to cross the river year-round without using ferries or rail tracks on top of the river ice. In 1941 a railway tunnel was added as well.

Later, a combined road and rail bridge over the Amur at Komsomolsk-on-Amur (1975; 1400 m) and the road and rail Khabarovsk Bridge (1999; 3890 m) were constructed.

The Tongjiang-Nizhneleninskoye railway bridge links Nizhneleninskoye, Jewish Autonomous Oblast with Tongjiang, Heilongjiang Province. The Chinese portion of the bridge was finished in July 2016. In December 2016, work began on the Russian portion of the bridge. The structural link between the two sides of the bridge was completed in March 2019, and the bridge was completed in August 2021. It opened to rail traffic in November 2022.

The Blagoveshchensk–Heihe Bridge connects the cities of Blagoveshchensk, Russia, and Heihe, China. The construction of the bridge started in 2016 and was completed in late 2019. Regular bridge traffic started on June 10, 2022 only for freight traffic, and bridge opened for passenger vehicles on January 2, 2025.

== Wildlife ==
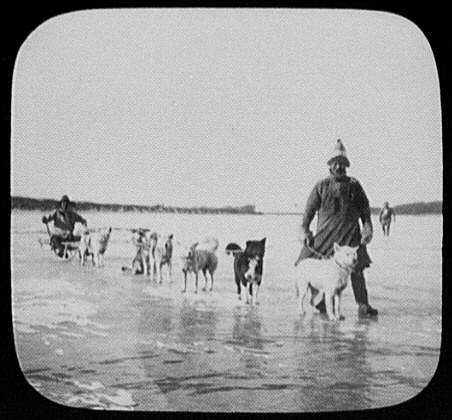
Nanai men with dog sled on the Amur, 1895

It is believed there are at least 123 species of fish from 23 families inhabiting the Amur. The majority are of the Gobioninae subfamily of Cypriniformes, followed in number by Salmonidae. Several of the species are endemic. Pseudaspius and Mesocottus are monotypic genera found only in the Amur and some nearby coastal rivers. Other animals inhabiting this region include the Amur falcon, Amur leopard and Amur tiger; while some notable local flora include Amur cork tree, Amur maple and the Amur honeysuckle.

Four species of the Acipenseridae family can be found: the kaluga, Amur sturgeon, Sakhalin sturgeon and sterlet. The Kaluga and Amur sturgeon are endemic. The sterlet was introduced from the Ob in the 1950s. This region is home to the kaluga fish (Acipenseriformes).

== Direction ==
Flowing across northeast Asia for over 4,444 kilometres (2,761 mi) (including its two tributaries), from the mountains of northeastern China to the Sea of Okhotsk (near Nikolayevsk-na-Amure), it drains a watershed that includes diverse landscapes of desert, steppe, tundra, and taiga, eventually emptying into the Pacific Ocean through the Strait of Tartary, where the mouth of the river faces the northern end of the island of Sakhalin.

The Amur has always been closely associated with the island of Sakhalin at its mouth, and most names for the island, even in the languages of the indigenous peoples of the region, are derived from the name of the river: "Sakhalin" derives from a Tungusic dialectal form cognate with Manchu sahaliyan ("black", as in sahaliyan ula, "Black River"), while Ainu and Japanese "Karaputo" or "Karafuto" is derived from the Ainu name of the Amur or its mouth. Anton Chekhov vividly described the Amur in writings about his journey to Sakhalin Island in 1890.

The average annual discharge varies from 6,000 cubic metres per second (210,000 cu ft/s) (1980) to 12,000 cubic metres per second (420,000 cu ft/s) (1957), leading to an average 9,819 cubic metres per second (346,800 cu ft/s) or 310 cubic kilometres (74 mi^{3}) per year. The maximum runoff measured occurred in Oct 1951 with 30,700 cubic metres per second (1,080,000 cu ft/s) whereas the minimum discharge was recorded in March 1946 with a mere 514 cubic metres per second (18,200 cu ft/s).

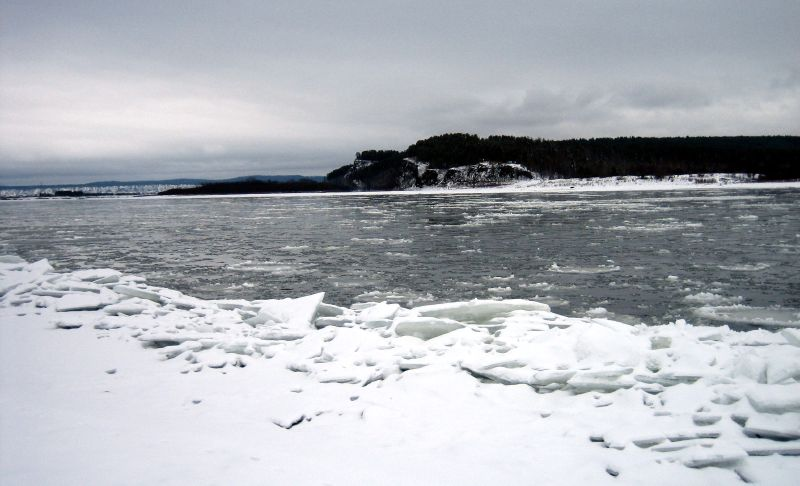
Ice drift on the Amur

== See also ==
- Amur Military Flotilla
- Geography of China
- Geography of Russia
- List of longest undammed rivers
- Sino-Soviet border conflict
- Sixty-Four Villages East of the Heilong Jiang
