= Rostov Nature Reserve =

Strict nature reserve in Rostov Oblast, Russia

- Russian: Ростовский заповедник (Also: Rostovsky)
- IUCN category Ia (strict nature reserve)
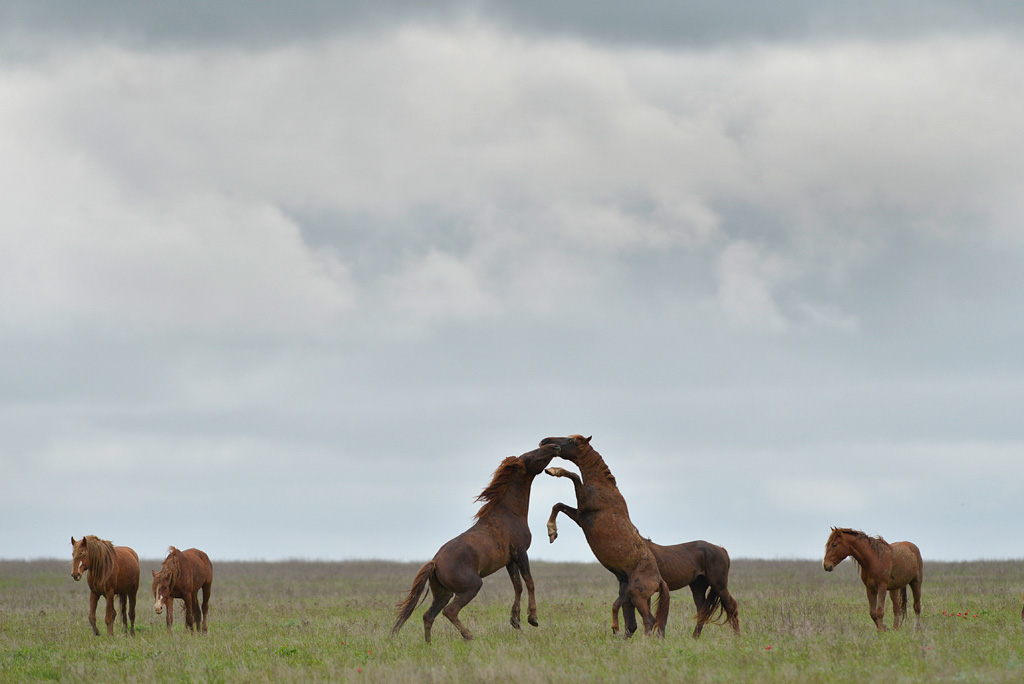
- Rostov Zapovednik

- Location within Russia Location within Europe
- Location: Rostov Oblast
- Nearest city: Rostov-on-Don
- Coordinates: 46°27′53″N 43°3′2″E
- Area: 9,465 hectares (23,389 acres; 37 sq mi)
- Established: 1995
- Governing body: Ministry of Natural Resources and Environment (Russia)
- Website: http://www.rgpbz.ru/

Rostov Nature Reserve (Russian: Ростовский заповедник) (also Rostovsky) is a Russian 'zapovednik' (strict nature reserve) that protects a variety of sensitive southern European steppe wetlands, the largest herd of wild horses in Europe (the Don Mustangs), and also wetland habitat for birds. The protected areas are divided into five sections that cover the waters of Lake Manych-Gudilo, islands in that lake, surrounding steppe and shore lands. The reserve is situated in the Orlovsky District, of Rostov Oblast, about 100 km northeast of Rostov-on-Don. It is part of a Ramsar Wetland site of international importance.

== Topography ==
The Rostov Nature Reserve is located in the south of the East European plain, in the Manych River valley. The dominant geological feature of the reserve is Lake Manych-Gudilo, a saltwater reservoir which is surrounded be dry steppe and semi-desert landscape. The lake is long and narrow, occupying a portion of the Manych trough between the Sea of Azov and the Caspian Sea; this long depression is the remains of what was once a sea connection between the Black and Caspian Seas.

There are four separated sectors to the Reserve:

- The Island Sector. (4,591 ha). Water Island and Burnt Island, in the northern part of the lake, plus nearby coast land. Maximum elevation is 93 meters. This sector is across the lake from Chyornye Zemli Nature Reserve.
- Starikovskii Sector. (2,115 ha). Second terrace above the Manych floodplain. Undulating terrain with deep ravines; maximum height is 153 meters.
- Krasnopartizanskaya Sector. (1,768 ha). In the southeast in the Remontnensky district.
- Tsagaan-Haq Sector. (990 ha). A salt marsh that is flooded in Spring.

== Climate and Ecoregion ==
The Rostov Reserve is located in middle of the Pontic steppe ecoregion, a region of temperate grasslands, savannas, and shrublands north of the Black Sea and Caspian Sea, between the Dnieper River and the Ural Mountains.

The climate of Rostov is Humid continental climate, hot summer (Köppen climate classification (Dfa)). This climate is characterized by large swings in temperature, both diurnally and seasonally, with warm summers and cold winters, and at least one month averaging over 22 °C (72 °F). Summers on the Rostov Reserve are hot, with temperatures reaching 40 C degrees. The average precipitation ranges from 250 mm - 500 mm depending on location.

== Flora and fauna ==
The immediate area of the reserve is a terrain of fescue-feather grass steppe. In this area there are widespread wheatgrasses and patches of bluegrass. The areas with more saline soils support large and complex communities of halophytes (salt-tolerate plants). The Tsagaan-Haq tract in particular features extensive salt marshes.

The reserve is known as a central protected zone of the largest herd of wild horses in Europe. Birds are the most numerous animals by species in the reserve. Residents include the bustard, little tern, Pygmy Cormorant, pink and Dalmatian pelican, spoonbill, black-headed gull, owl, and flamingos. The reserve has recorded more than 200 bird species, of which about 120 nest in the area, and 63 species have been observed here during their migrations.

== Ecotourism ==
Ecotourism is supported by the Reserve, with two nature trails open to the public. One trail, "The Riddles of the Manycheskoy Valley", is a 2 km hike on a circular route along the lake shore. It has an observation tower for viewing the horses, a picnic gazebo, and a dock for boat excursions to one of the islands of the reserve. The other trail, "Azure Flower", tours fields of tulips and iris and features large flocks of cranes and gulls. Tours are conducted on these routes from April to October and are designed for visitors of all ages. It is also possible to apply for guided visits to some of the smaller salt lakes, which had been used in the past for commercial salt production and medicinal muds from their mudflats. The reserve also operates a visitor center with tourist facilities and a nature museum.

As a strict nature reserve, however, the Rostov Reserve is mostly closed to the general public. Scientists and those with 'environmental education' purposes can make arrangements with park management for visits off the marked ecological trails.

== See also ==
- List of Russian Nature Reserves (class 1a 'zapovedniks')
- WikiCommons gallery: Manych-Gudilo Protected Area
