= Shaytan-Tau Nature Reserve =

Nature reserve in Bashkortostan, Russia

- Russian: Заповедник Шайтан-Тау
- IUCN category Ia (strict nature reserve)
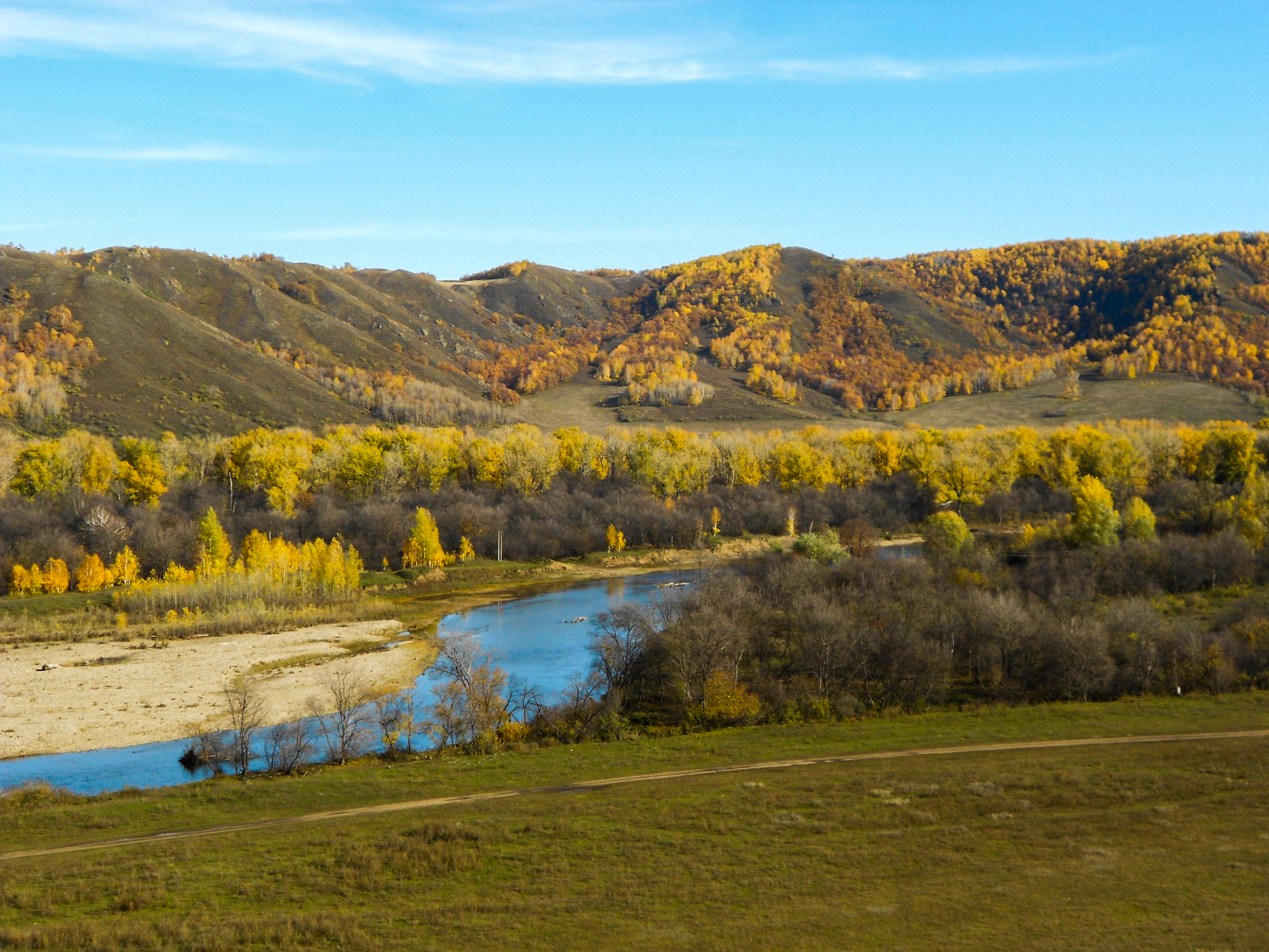
- Shaytan-Tau Zapovednik

- Location within Russia
- Location: Orenburg Oblast
- Nearest city: Kuvandyk
- Coordinates: 51°47′17″N 57°25′3″E
- Area: 6,726 hectares (16,620 acres; 26 sq mi)
- Established: 2014
- Governing body: Ministry of Natural Resources and Environment (Russia)
- Website: http://www.orenzap.ru/

Shaytan-Tau Nature Reserve (Russian: Шайтан-Тау заповедник) (from the Turkic "Devils Mountain") is a Russian 'zapovednik' (strict nature reserve) located along the Shaytantau ridge of the Southern Urals. The ridge contains limestone reefs which are of Cambrian age, almost 500 million years old. The main purpose of the reserve is to conserve representative Dubravnaya steppe and low-lying bog habitats of relict and endemic species of plants and animals. The area is the youngest (and smallest) federal reserve in the Urals, being set aside for protection on October 9, 2014. It is separated into four sectors, situated in both the Kuvandyksky District of Orenburg Oblast, and in Bashkortostan. It is about 220 km from the regional city of Orenburg.

== Topography ==
The Shaytan-Tau Reserve is located in low valleys of the right bank of the Sakmara River and Kurasha River in Southern Urals. The Shaytantau ridge is in fact the most southern spur of the Urals. The terrain that is mostly forest-steppe. There are mountain streams, but by the mid-summer many of them are dry. The highest altitude is 578 m (1,896 ft) on top of the Karasura plateau at the headwaters of the Kurasha River. The lowest point 207 meters in the river valleys. The ridge features rocks of Silurian and Devonian periods (jasper, siliceous shale, tuffaceous sandstones, conglomerates, serpentinite, and others.) The limestone outcrops contain fossils of marine invertebrates and algae.

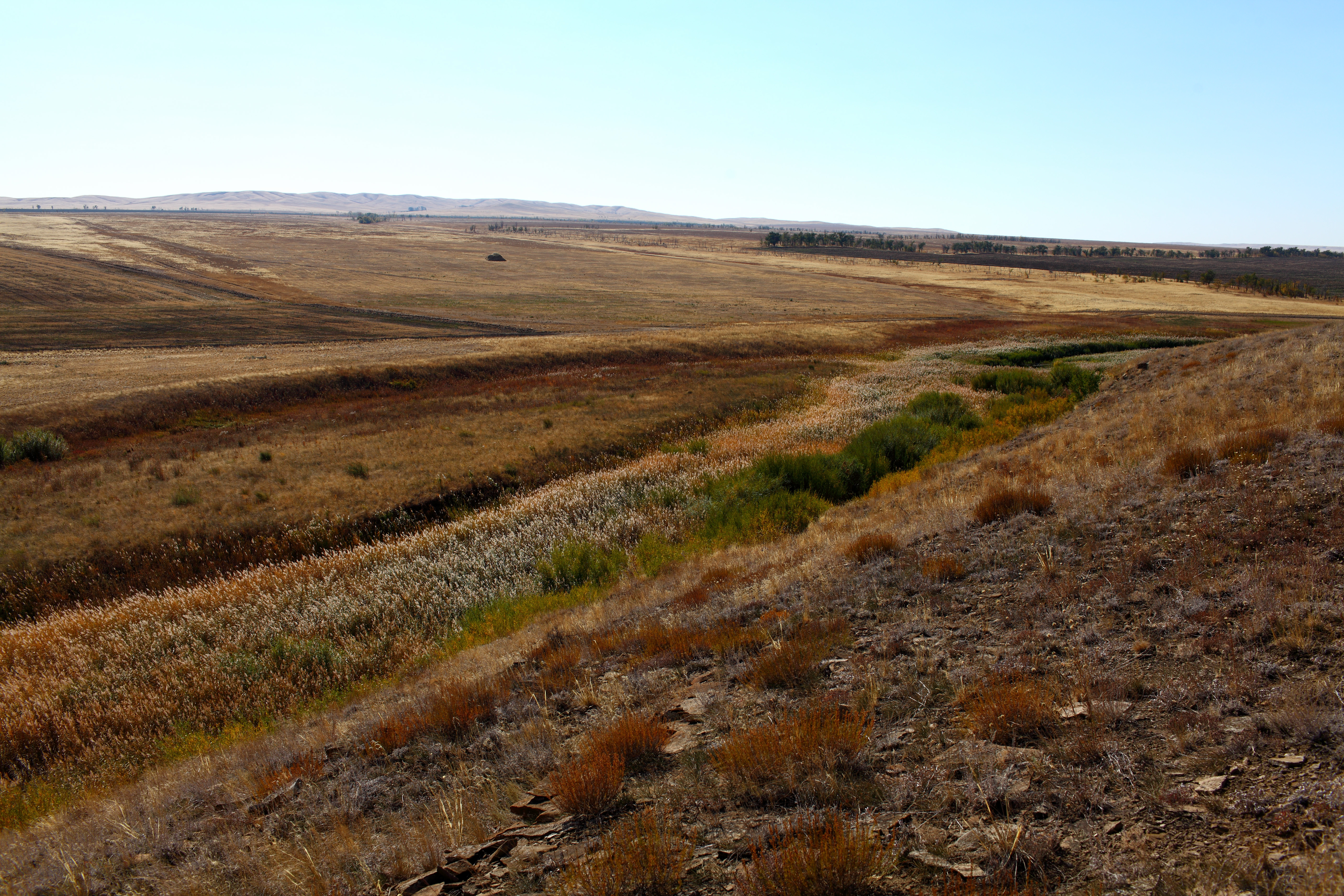
Kurasha River

== Climate and ecoregion ==
Shatan-Tau is located in the Pontic–Caspian steppe ecoregion. The Pontic steppe (name after Euxeinos Pontos, the Black Sea), is a grassland that stretches from eastern Romania to Kazakhstan, across the northern edges of the Black Sea and Caspian Sea. It is an expansive prairie that is relatively flat and has fertile soil.

The climate of Shatan-Tau is Humid continental climate, warm summer (Köppen climate classification (Dfb)). This climate is characterized by large swings in temperature, both diurnally and seasonally, with mild summers and cold, snowy winters.

== Flora and fauna ==
The plant communities of Shaytan-Tau are a those of the meeting zone between the Eastern European deciduous oak and linden forests, and mixed-grass meadows and rocky steppes. The animal life of the reserve is similarly a combination of taiga animal species (brown bear, elk, wild boar, marten, lynx, squirrels, badgers, etc.), and steppe species (such as marmot, ground squirrel, and pika). Representative birds include the peregrine falcon, osprey, and golden eagle. Scientists on the reserve have recorded 40 species of mammals, 101 birds, 6 reptiles, and 6 amphibians.

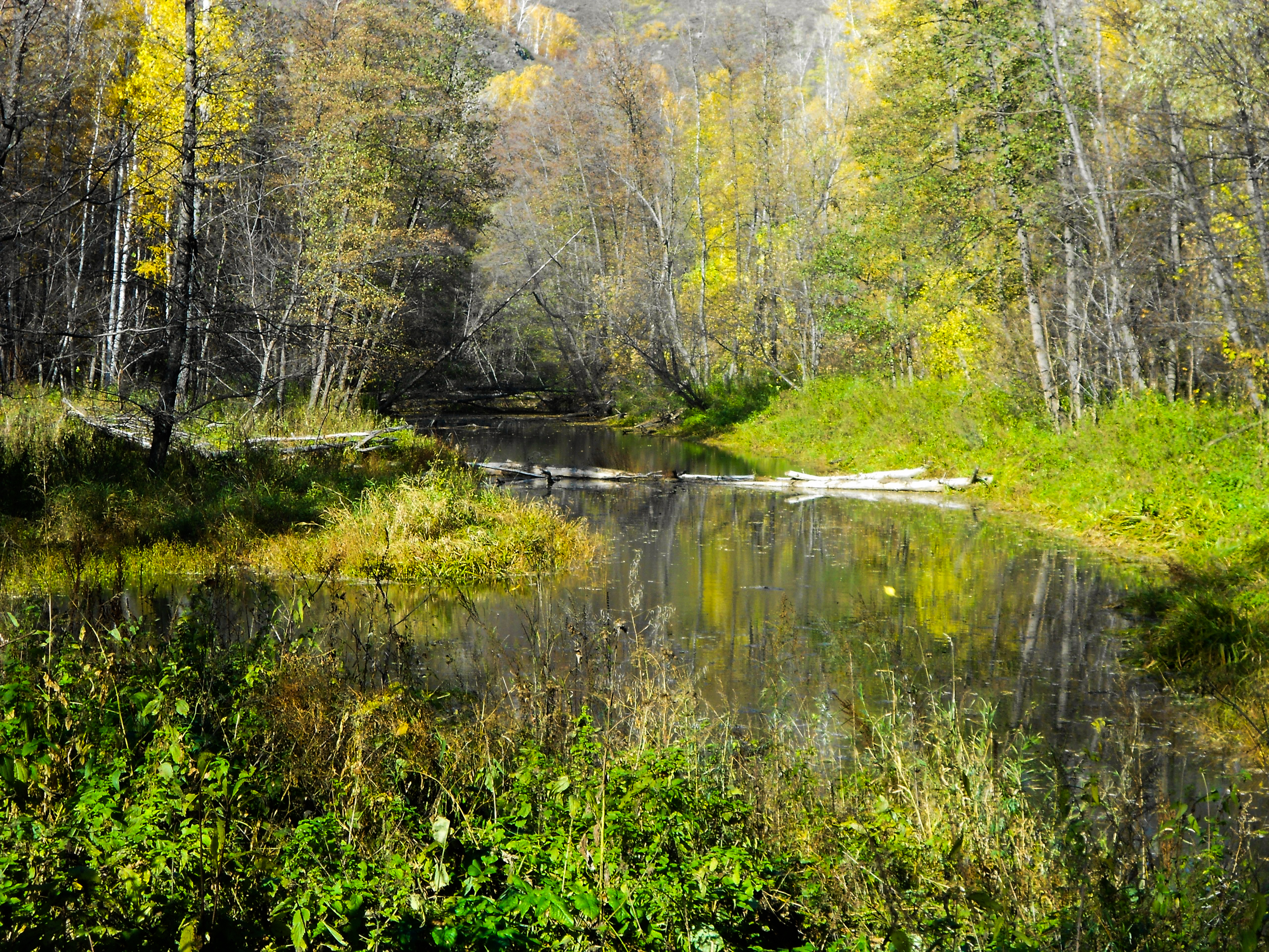
Forest swamp in Shaytan-Tau lowlands

== Ecoeducation and access ==
As a strict nature reserve, the Shaytan-Tau Reserve is mostly closed to the general public, although scientists and those with 'environmental education' purposes can make arrangements with park management for visits. Public groups may be able to arrange for a guided tour on an 'ecotourist route', but permits must be obtained in advance. Shaytan-Tau is jointly administered, along with the Orenburg Nature Reserve by FGBU Orenburg Zapovednik. There is a staff of over 40 scientists, rangers, educators, and administrators. The main office is in the city of Orenburg.

== See also ==
- List of Russian Nature Reserves (IUCN class Ia 'Zapovedniks')
- National parks of Russia (IUCN class II protected areas)
