= Nizhnesvirsky Nature Reserve =

Strict nature reserve in Leningrad Oblast, Russia

- IUCN category Ia (strict nature reserve)
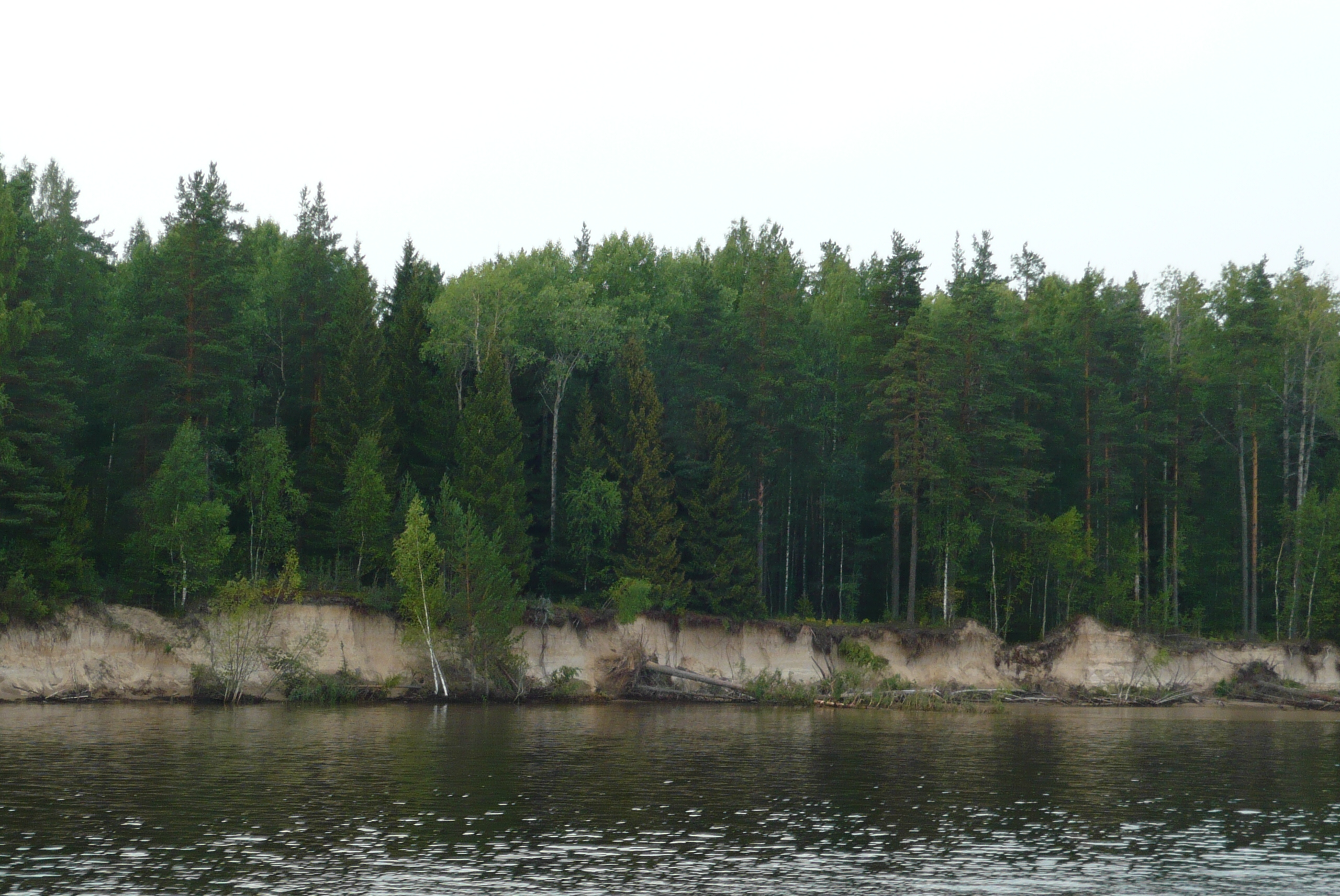

- Location within Russia
- Location: Russia
- Nearest city: Lodeynoye Pole
- Coordinates: 60°36′N 33°0′E
- Area: 416 km^{2} (161 sq mi)
- Established: June 11, 1980

The Nizhnesvirsky Nature Reserve (Russian: Нижнесвирский заповедник, lit. Lower Svir Zapovednik) is a 416 km^{2} (131 sq mi) zapovednik in Lodeynopolsky District of Leningrad Oblast, Russia, established on June 11, 1980 to protect landscapes of the eastern shore of Lake Ladoga.

== Geography ==
The nature reserve occupies lowlands on the right bank of the lower Svir River, including a portion of the eastern shore of Lake Ladoga and its waters. The zapovednik's northern border coincides with the border of the Republic of Karelia. The areas across the border belong to Olonetsky Zakaznik. About 30% of the reserve is swamp and peat bog, with additional transient fens and wetlands. The forests are coniferous spruce with an under-story of blueberry bush and shrub. The terrain features sand ridges left by the retreating glaciers in the last Ice Age. The reserve is in the Scandinavian and Russian taiga ecoregion, and has a humid continental climate (Köppen's Dfb).

== History ==
It was first proposed in the 1950s that protected areas on the eastern shore of Lake Ladoga be created. At the time, the proposals were rejected by the authorities. The expansion and the industrial growth of the city of Leningrad caused considerable impact on the ecology of surrounding areas, and it was again proposed that a protected area be established to study this impact. In 1976 a large-scale program started, and, in particular, Nizhnesvirsky Zakaznik was established. Eventually, the zakaznik was transformed into a nature reserve in 1980.

== Fauna and flora ==
It is an important stopover location for migratory birds. The predominant tree species is Scots Pine. A considerable area is occupied by swamps.

Forty species of mammals occur in the nature reserve. Big mammals include brown bear, moose, and lynx.

== See also ==
- List of Russian Nature Reserves (class 1a 'zapovedniks')
