= Privolzhskaya Lesostep Nature Reserve =

Nature reserve in Penza Oblast, Russia

- Russian: Заповедник «Приволжская лесостепь»
- IUCN category Ia (strict nature reserve)
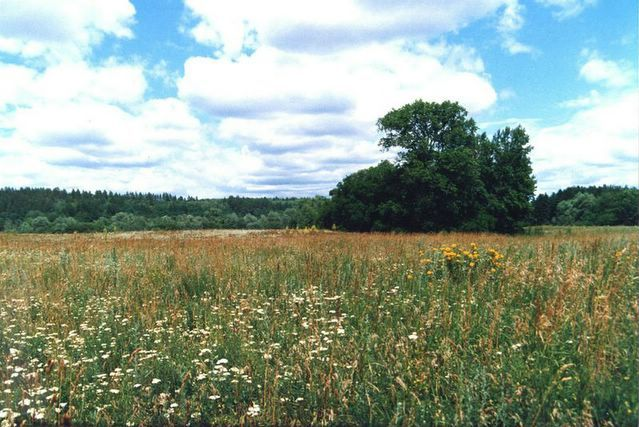
- Poperechenskaya Steppe

- Location within Russia
- Location: Penza Oblast
- Nearest city: Penza
- Coordinates: 53°20′20″N 46°51′55″E
- Area: 8,373 hectares (20,690 acres; 32 sq mi)
- Established: 1989
- Governing body: Ministry of Natural Resources and Environment (Russia)
- Website: http://zpls.ru/

Privolzhskaya Lesostep Nature Reserve (Russian: Государственный природный заповедник «Приволжская лесостепь», "Cis-Volga Forest steppe Nature Reserve") is a Russian zapovednik (strict ecological reserve) situated in the watershed midway between the Volga River and the Don River. The reserve is divided into 5 sectors, all in the western part of the Volga Uplands. Three of the sectors are steppe terrain, and two are forests. Rivers with upper reaches in the reserve flow into both the Don and the Volga. Administratively, the reserve is situated in the Kuznetsky District of Penza Oblast. The reserve was formally established in 1989 with the stated purpose of protecting representative habitat of the northern steppes, and the transition zone from steppe to forest. Some sections of the reserve, however, have been protected since 1919. In all, the reserve sectors cover an area of 8,373 ha (32.33 sq mi), and has additional buffer zones out to 1 km from the reserve borders.

== Topography ==
The Privolshky Les Reserve is spread over five sectors, separated by up to 2340 km at the greatest extent:

- Kuncherovskaya steppe (1024 hectares). Kuncherovskaya is a combination of forest (80%) and steppe (20%) on a high plateau and slopes of different exposures to the left bank of the Kadadah River, near the village of Old Circe. The forests are oak communities, pine forests (artificial plantations), and secondary forests of aspen and birch. The steppe area is primarily composed of associations herb-turf-grass, with some young Scots pine. 555 species of vascular plants have been recorded.
- Ostrovtsovskaya steppe (352 hectares). Ostrovtsovskaya is located on terraces of the right bank of the Khopyor River floodplain in Kolyshleysky District, near the village of Ostrovtsy. The vegetation cover is characterized by a predominance of Tatar maple and cherry, with undergrowth of shrubs, and turf-grass-mixed-grass steppe associations. The steppe area is being encroached on by new brush and afforestation. 542 species of vascular plants have been recorded.
- Poperechenskaya Steppe (252 hectares). Poperchenskaya is located on the slopes of the upper reaches of the Khopyor River, on the border of the Kamensky Region and Penza Region. It is dominated by turf-grass-mixed grass prairie and grassland-rhizome association, characterized by thickets of scrub steppe. 475 species of vascular plants have been recorded.
- Verhnesursky forest area (6,334 hectares). Verchesursky is located on the ancient river terraces in the upper reaches of the Sura River, in the northeast of the Kuznetsk district. The forest area is mostly pine forest (including artificial plantations) and secondary growth of birch. There are smaller stands of aspen, oak and alder. 586 species of vascular plants have been recorded.

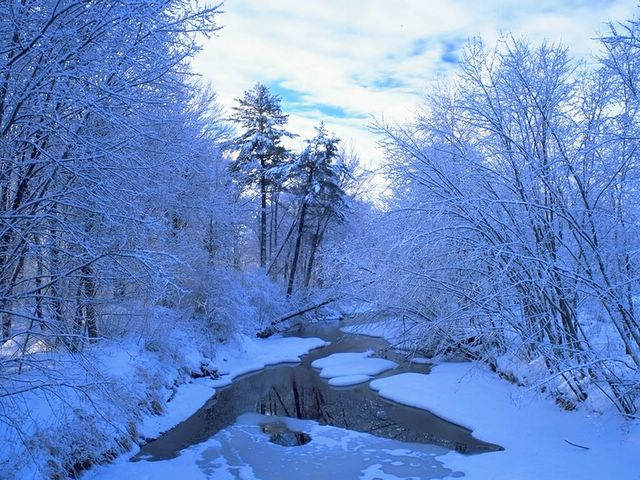
Forest sector

- Pine Forest on Kadadah or Borok (399 hectares). Borok is located on the left bank of the floodplain and river terraces of the Kadadah River, in the north of Kameshkirskogo district. It features artificial pine forests, which are experiencing the emergence of oak and small-leaf forest trees. There are also marshy areas with alder communities. 530 species of vascular plants have been recorded.

Two of the five sectors (Poperechenskaya and Ostrovtsovskaya) were within the zone of the Dnieper glaciation, and show the evidence in their terrain; the other three sectors were outside of the glacial area.

== Climate and ecoregion ==
Privolshky Les is located in the East European forest steppe ecoregion, a transition zone between the broad leaf forests of the north and the grasslands to the south. This ecoregion is characterized by a mosaic of forests, steppe, and riverine wetlands.

The climate of Privolshky Les is Humid continental climate, warm summer (Köppen climate classification (Dfb)). This climate is characterized by large swings in temperature, both diurnally and seasonally, with mild summers and cold, snowy winters. The average temperature in Penza in January is −12.1 °C (10.2 °F), and is 19.8 °C (67.6 °F) in July. Snow cover lasts from mid-November to mid-April. Average rainfall is 666 mm/year.

== Flora and fauna ==
The sectors of the reserve were selected to protect different biological communities and environmental surroundings. The forest-steppe sectors are on grey soil, with pine and mixed forest and some oak groves. The steppe areas are meadows, with some sedge-grass marsh, on black soil. The Poperechenskaya sector, for example, is 54% meadow steppe, 8% shrub steppe, and the remainder of patchwork of small forest stands and other floral communities. Feather grass is a notable feature. Scientists on the reserve have recorded 860 total vascular plant species across the sectors.

The animal life of the reserve is characteristic of the forest-steppe region: marten, badger, elk and wild boar among the mammals. The steppe mammals also include the Great jerboa (a large, jumping mouse), the European hamster, and Steppe lemming. Common steppe birds include the Whinchat, the Eurasian skylark, and the Black kite. Along the rivers in the Verchoya sector are beavers and moose.

== Ecoeducation and access ==
As a strict nature reserve, the Privolshky Les Reserve is mostly closed to the general public, although scientists and those with 'environmental education' purposes can make arrangements with park management for visits. There are 'ecotourist' routes in the reserve, however, that are open to the public, but require permits to be obtained in advance. In the Borok protected area there is a designated area for public swimming and fishing. In the Kuncherovskaya steppe zone there is an eco-tour by horse-drawn cart for public groups, and very small groups can make arrangements for a guide excursion in the Sura area to see the work of beavers. The main office is in the city of Penza.

== See also ==
- List of Russian Nature Reserves (class 1a 'zapovedniks')
- National Parks of Russia
