= East Ural Nature Reserve =

Nature reserve and exclusion zone in Chelyabinsk Oblast, Russia

- Russian: Восточно-Уральский заповедник
- IUCN category Ia (strict nature reserve)
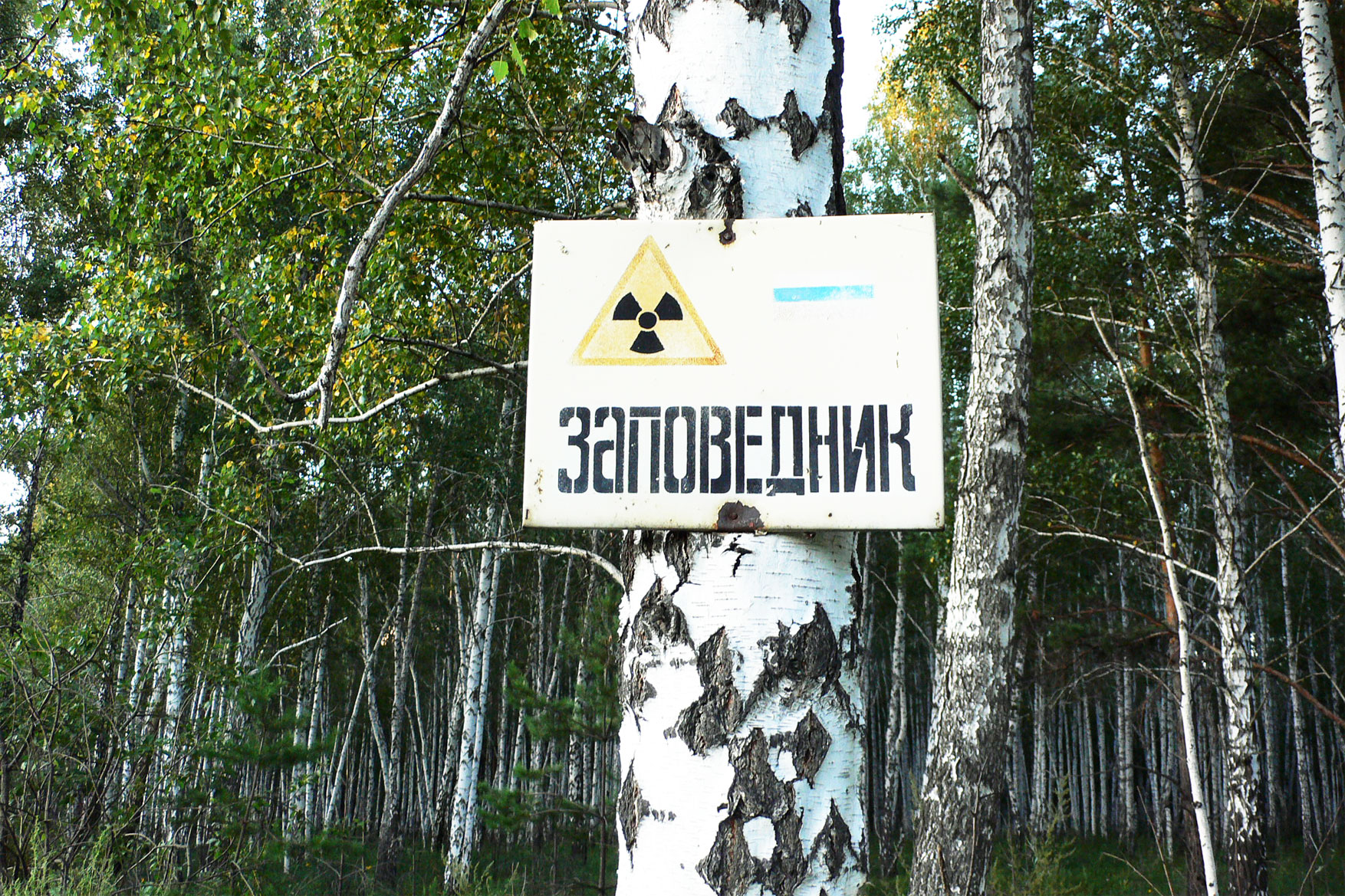
- East Ural Zapovednik

- Location within Russia
- Location: Chelyabinsk Oblast
- Nearest city: Chelyabinsk
- Coordinates: 55°48′52″N 60°53′58″E
- Area: 16,600 hectares (41,019 acres; 64 sq mi; 166 km^{2})
- Established: 1968
- Governing body: Ministry of Natural Resources and Environment (Russia)

East Ural Nature Reserve (Russian: Восточно-Уральский заповедник) is a Russian 'zapovednik' (strict nature reserve) that is near the site of the 1957 Kyshtym disaster, the world's second highest radioactivity release after Chernobyl. As a state "radiation reserve", the site functions for the protection of a contaminated area, and for long-term scientific study of the effects of radiation on the forest-steppe ecology on the east slope of the southern Ural Mountains. The reserve is situated in Ozyorsk, Chelyabinsk Oblast. It was formally established in 1968, and covers 16,600 ha (64 sq mi; 166 km^{2}). The reserve, as of 2007, is under the control of Rosatom, a state-run corporation, which conducts regular radiation and radio ecological monitoring.

== Topography ==
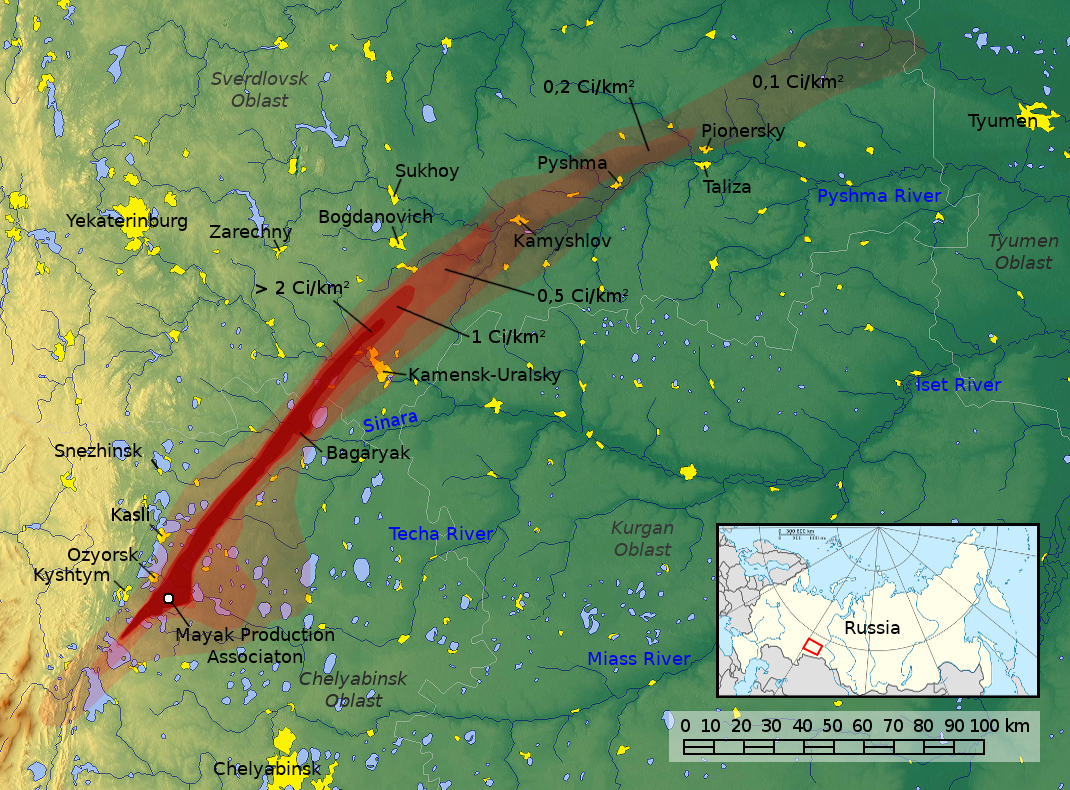
Track of the radiation plume from the Kyshtym event; the East Ural Reserve covers approximately a quarter of the trace in the southwest near the release site.

The East Ural Reserve is oblong in shape, pointing towards the northeast, with a width of approximately 10 km and a length of 50 km.

== Ecoregion and climate ==
East Ural Nature Reserve is located in the West Siberian taiga ecoregion, a region that covers the West Siberian Plain, from the Urals to the Central Siberian Plateau. It is a region of extensive conifer boreal forests, and also extensive wetlands, including bogs and mires.

The climate of East Ural Nature Reserve is humid continental climate, cool summer (Köppen climate classification subarctic climate). This climate is characterized by mild summers (only 1–3 months above 10 °C (50.0 °F)) and cold, snowy winters (coldest month below −3 °C (26.6 °F)).

== Ecoeducation and access ==
As a state radiation and strict nature reserve, the East Ural Reserve is not accessible to the public.

== See also ==
- List of Russian Nature Reserves (class 1a 'zapovedniks')
