= Prisursky Nature Reserve =

Nature reserve in Chuvashia, Russia

Prisurski Nature Reserve
- Russian: Присурский заповедник (Also: Prisursky)
- IUCN category Ia (strict nature reserve)
- Location within Russia
- Location: Chuvash Republic
- Nearest city: Cheboksary
- Coordinates: 55°2′0″N 46°45′0″E
- Area: 9,150.4 hectares (22,611 acres; 35 sq mi)
- Established: 1995
- Governing body: Ministry of Natural Resources and Environment (Russia)
- Website: http://www.zapoved.ru/catalog/105/

Prisurski Nature Reserve (Russian: Присурский заповедник) (also Prisursky) is a Russian zapovednik (strict ecological reserve) in the northern Volga Uplands of the East European Plain. It protects for study an area of forest-steppe and mixed forest, with sections in different parts of Chuvashia. The largest sector is the Alatyrski Nature Reserve, located in the valley of the Sura River (mixed coniferous and deciduous forests), and two small steppe sections to the southeast (Batyrevski and Jaltsjikski reserves). The reserve is situated in the Alatyr, Chuvash Republic District of the Chuvash Republic. It was set aside as a reserve in 1995 to protect the largest and least disturbed area of southern taiga lowland forest in Chuvashia, as well as steppe habitat at the northern edge of its range. A particular concern was protecting habitat of the muskrat and seasonal waterfowl. The reserve covers an area of 9,150 ha (35.3 sq mi).

== Topography ==
The Prisurski Reserve has a terrain that is mostly a hilly plain with mixed forest on sandy-clay soil. Where the landscape is cut by streams there are gullies and ravines. The general terrain is at an elevation of 130–180 meters, with a highest point of 221 meters about sea level. The three sections of the reserve are:

- Alatyrski Nature Reserve (9025 ha). Located on the right bank of the Sura River valley along its floodplain. This sector is mostly mixed coniferous and deciduous forests.
- Batyrevski Nature Reserve (27.60 ha). Steppe terrain on a steep southern-facing slope.
- Jaltsjikski Nature Reserve (97.80 ha) Steppe terrain; a network of rivers and gullies at river headwaters.

Surrounding these are buffer zones totaling 25,497.5 hectares (98.446 sq mi).

== Climate and ecoregion ==
Prisurski is located in the East European forest steppe ecoregion, which is a transition zone between the broad-leaf forests of the north and the grasslands to the south. This ecoregion is a mosaic of forests, steppe, and riverine wetlands.

The climate of Prisurski is Humid continental climate, warm summer (Köppen climate classification (Dfb)). There are large swings in temperature, both diurnally and seasonally, with mild summers and cold, snowy winters. The average temperature in January is −12.5 °C (9.5 °F), while the average temperature in July is 19 °C (66 °F). Annual precipitation is 430 to 750 mm/year. The growing season is 153 days.

In Prisurski, 80% of the precipitation falls in the spring, leading to extensive spring floods, with stable winter and low water in summer.

== Flora and fauna ==
In the Alatyrski site, the floral communities are northern deciduous forests (66% of the ground), with smaller conifer forests of Scots pine and spruce (33% of the territory). The age structure of the trees (as of 2013) was 24% young, 53% middle-aged, 10% maturing, and 13% mature and beyond. Scientists on the reserve have recorded 722 species of flowering plants.

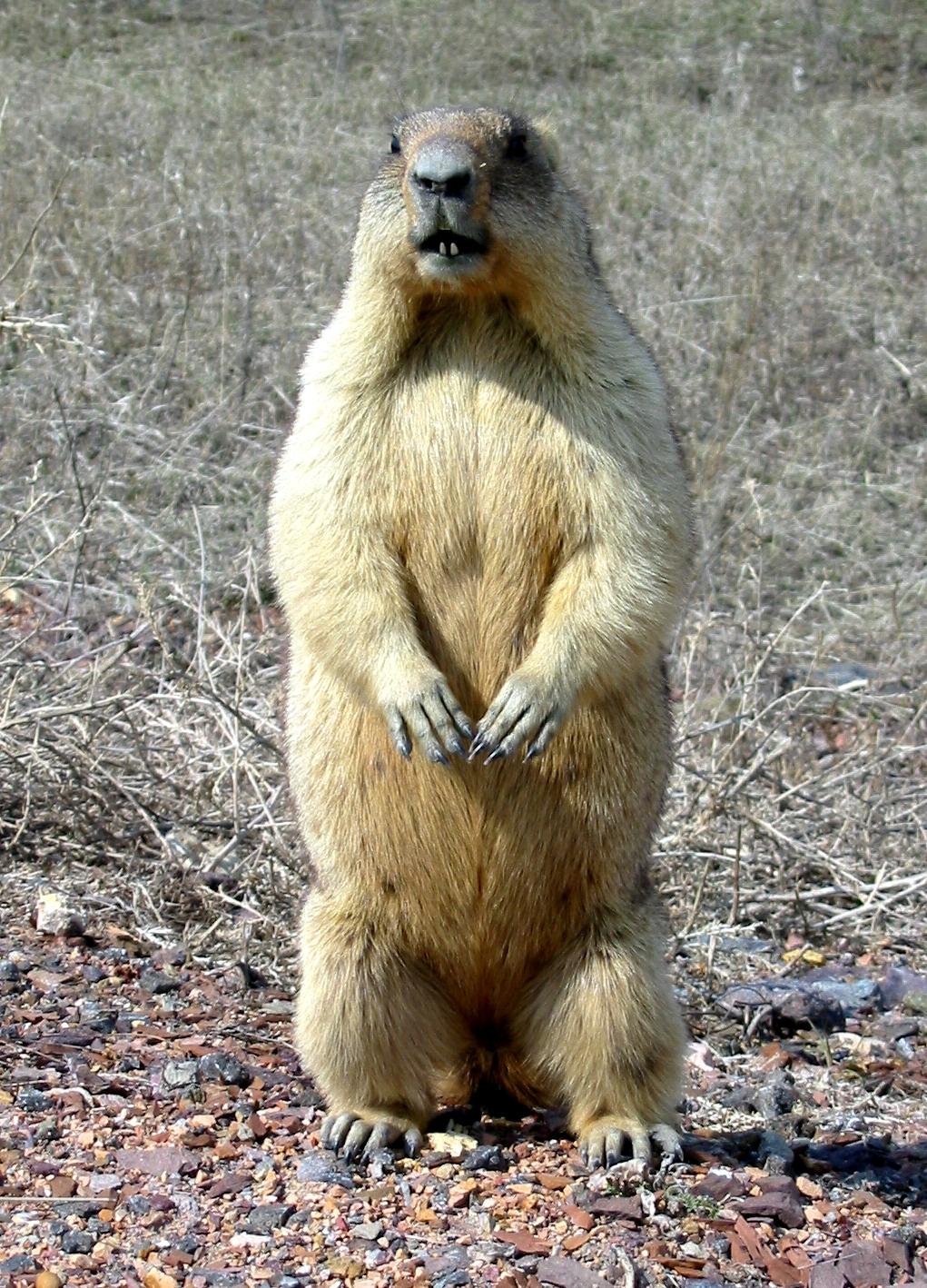
Bobak Marmot

The animal life of the reserve is representative of mixed deciduous forests and meadow steppes. The reserve is known in particular for the population of Bobak marmots on the Batyrevski tract. Scientists on the reserve have recorded 44 species of mammals, and 175 species of birds.

== Ecoeducation and access ==
As a strict nature reserve, the Prisurski Reserve is mostly closed to the general public, although scientists and those with 'environmental education' purposes can make arrangements with park management for visits. There are two 'ecotourist' routes in the reserve, however, that are open to the public, one each on the Alatyrski (forest) and Batyreski (marmot colony) sites. These routes require permits to be obtained in advance. The main office is in the city of Cheboksary.

== See also ==
- List of Russian Nature Reserves (class 1a 'zapovedniks')
- National Parks of Russia
