= Zapovednik =

Type of protected area in former Soviet countries

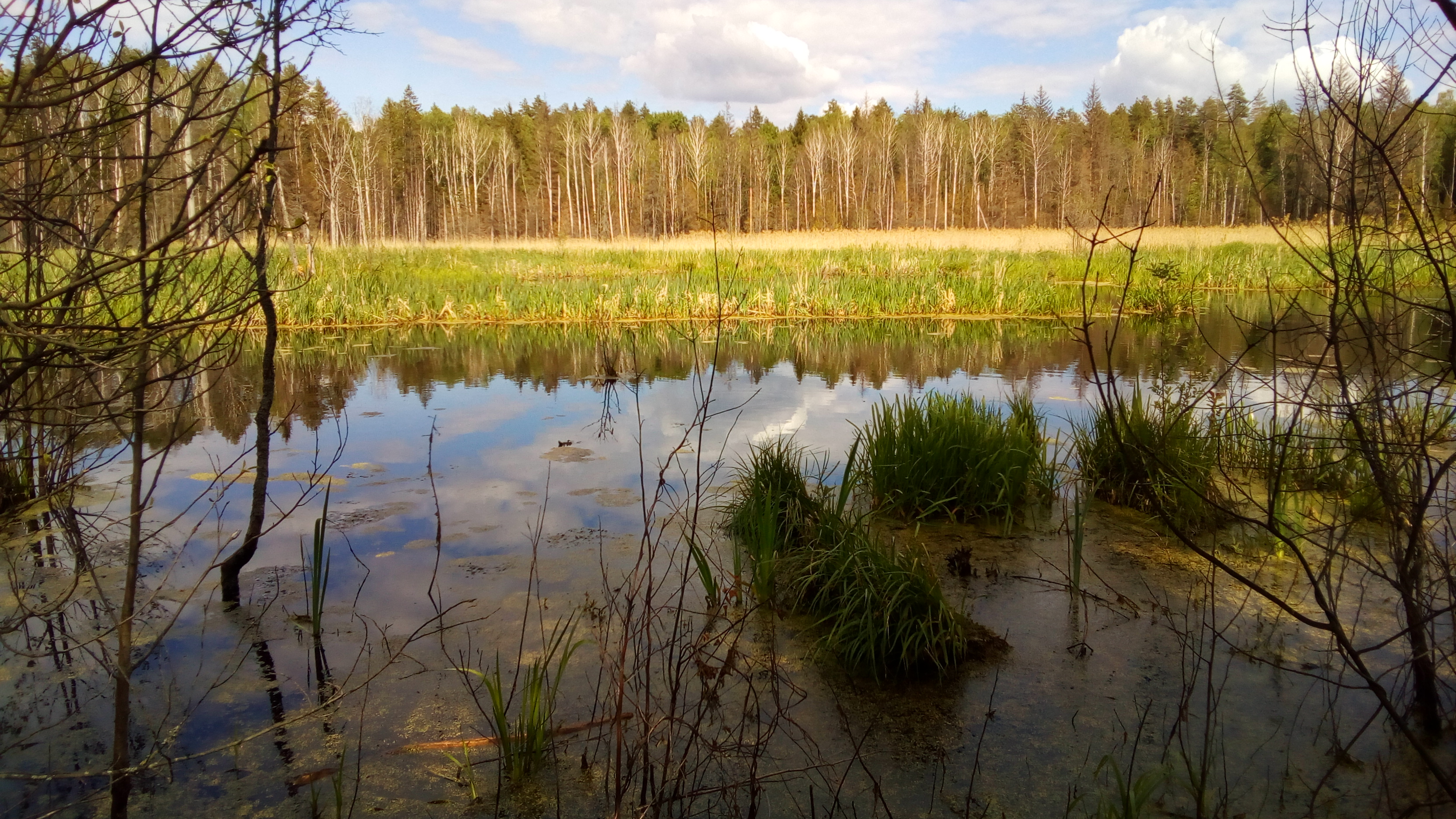
A view of the Bryansky Les Nature Reserve, a zapovednik of Russia

A zapovednik (Note: /ˌzæpoʊˈvɛdnɪk/ ZAP-oh-VED-nik; Russian: заповедник [zəpɐˈvʲedʲnʲɪk], (pl. заповедники), from the adjective заповедный, 'sacred, protected'; Ukrainian: заповідник (pl. заповідники), romanized: zapovidnyk [zɐpoˈwidnɪk]) is an established term on the territory of the former Soviet Union for a protected area which is kept "forever wild". It is the highest degree of environmental protection for the assigned areas, which are strictly protected. Access to the public is restricted.

== Overview ==
The literal English translation of zapovednik is "nature sanctuary" (like animal sanctuary); however, in practice, zapovedniks sometimes have to do with the protection of things other than nature and can incorporate historical-cultural, historical–archaeological, and other types of cultural or natural heritage. They also function as important sites for historical research and education and so are comparable to the Sites of Special Scientific Interest as found in the United Kingdom and Hong Kong.

The term zapovednik, which refers to the reserve, staff and infrastructure, was used in the Soviet Union and is still in use in the Russian Federation and in some of the other former Soviet republics. Many reserves have areas with different degrees of protection; sometimes grazing is permitted to a certain extent.

Other types of protected areas include national nature parks, zakazniks (referring to "state game reserve" because a limited amount of hunting is allowed there), natural monuments (often individual trees, geological exposures, or other small areas), etc. Some zapovedniks are recognized as biosphere reserves (or sanctuaries).

In Russia there are 101 zapovedniks covering about 330,000 square kilometers (130,000 sq mi), or about 1.4% of the country's total area. They include everything from isolated patches of steppe to large tracts of Siberia and the Arctic, and range in size from Galich'ya Gora at 2.31 km^{2} (570 acres) to the Great Arctic State Nature Reserve at 41,692 square kilometers (16,097 sq mi). The Russian Ministry of Natural Resources oversees 99 of the zapovedniks. The exceptions are Il'menskiy, which is administered by the Russian Academy of Sciences, and Galich'ya Gora, administered by Voronezh State University.

== Theory of zapovednost' ==
The theoretical justification for the zapovedniks is known as zapovednost' (заповедность) – meaning "the state of being protected in a zapovednik". It was developed in the 1890s and early 20th century, principally by the soil biologist Vasily Dokuchaev.

The fundamental idea of zapovednost' is the exclusion of people and the prohibition of economic activity, the only exceptions being non-intrusive access allowed to scientists and rangers. Zapovedniks are intended to be parcels of untouched natural ecosystems that can be studied as standards with which to compare managed ecosystems, such as are created in agriculture and forestry. To this end, zapovedniks need to be large enough to be self-sufficient, with a complete range of trophic levels up to the top predators.

In 1910 the theory of zapovednost' was taken a step forward by I. P. Borodin, who argued that zapovedniks should not be established piecemeal, but as a planned system of reserves including samples of all the main natural regions in the country.

In the 1940s Aldo Leopold understood the need for zapovednik-type reserves: "While even the largest wilderness areas become partially deranged, it required only a few wild acres for J. E. Weaver to discover why the prairie flora is more drought-resistant than the agronomic flora which has supplanted it." The answer was that the wild prairie had a much more complex, and more efficient, root system, and this could only have been discovered by studying the undisturbed natural ecosystem.

It would be difficult, to establish a 'perfect' zapovednik today, entirely natural and self-sufficient, especially in view of downstream effects involving pollution and greenhouse gases. Nevertheless, many Russian zapovedniks are a good approximation of the ideal and have been operating as scientific institutions for many decades.

== History ==
The first zapovedniks were set up in the steppe region of the Russian Empire in the 1890s. Some were equipped with research stations. Vasily Dokuchaev was the guiding spirit behind these early zapovedniks. Areas of steppe were chosen for the first zapovedniks because of the rapid disappearance of virgin steppe as it was ploughed up, and because it was thought that ploughing might be exacerbating the effects of drought. Research was needed in order to understand the steppe and how it could be best exploited.

The applied-science motivation for setting up zapovedniks was continued in the first state-organized zapovednik. Barguzin Nature Reserve was established by the tsarist government in 1916 on the eastern shore of Lake Baikal. Its purpose was to protect and study a population of sable – a valuable fur species that was declining due to over-hunting. Other zapovedniks appear to have been set up at about the same time but either lapsed (e.g. Sayan) or did not receive formal recognition until later.

Lenin's nationalization of the land in 1917 and 1918 created a legally favourable environment for the Soviet zapovednik system since securing areas of land for this purpose from private owners was no longer a problem. Lenin may have had an interest in nature protection because permission was granted promptly for the creation in 1919 of Astrakhan zapovednik in the Volga Delta on the north-western shore of the Caspian Sea.

The recognition of zapovedniks was put on a firm legal footing by a measure "On the Protection of Nature Monuments, Gardens and Parks", signed into law by Lenin in 1921. The creation of zapovedniks continued, but the measure also allowed for the establishment of national parks, though none were set up in the Soviet Union for another half century.

By 1933 there were 15 state zapovedniks in Russia, and by 1995, there were 115. The average area of new zapovedniks declined from 780 km^{2} in 1916–25 to 110 km^{2} in 1936–45, and then rose to 5,060 km^{2} in 1986–95. In 2007 there were 101 operating zapovedniks, reflecting a small number of new ones opened since 1995, but also two periods of closures and contraction of the system. The first of these was planned by Aleksandr Malinovskii; it was carried out in 1951 with a view to turning the zapovedniks into "commercial-and-research" institutions as well as releasing substantial areas of protected forest for commercial exploitation. Over the next 10 years the zapovednik system recovered somewhat, but in 1961 Nikita Khrushchev criticized it, famously referring to a film about them in which a scientist was shown watching a squirrel gnawing a nut. Six zapovedniks were closed and others were amalgamated or reduced in area.

Although in theory a zapovednik is an extensive area of unspoilt natural ecosystems used for scientific research with a residential staff of scientists and rangers, the history of many zapovedniks has in fact been rather different, sometimes involving closure, exploitation (including the felling of forest), and eventual reopening. Even so, some zapovedniks have had an almost unblemished history and most retain the original vision of being scientific research institutions not open to public recreation.

== Environments protected ==
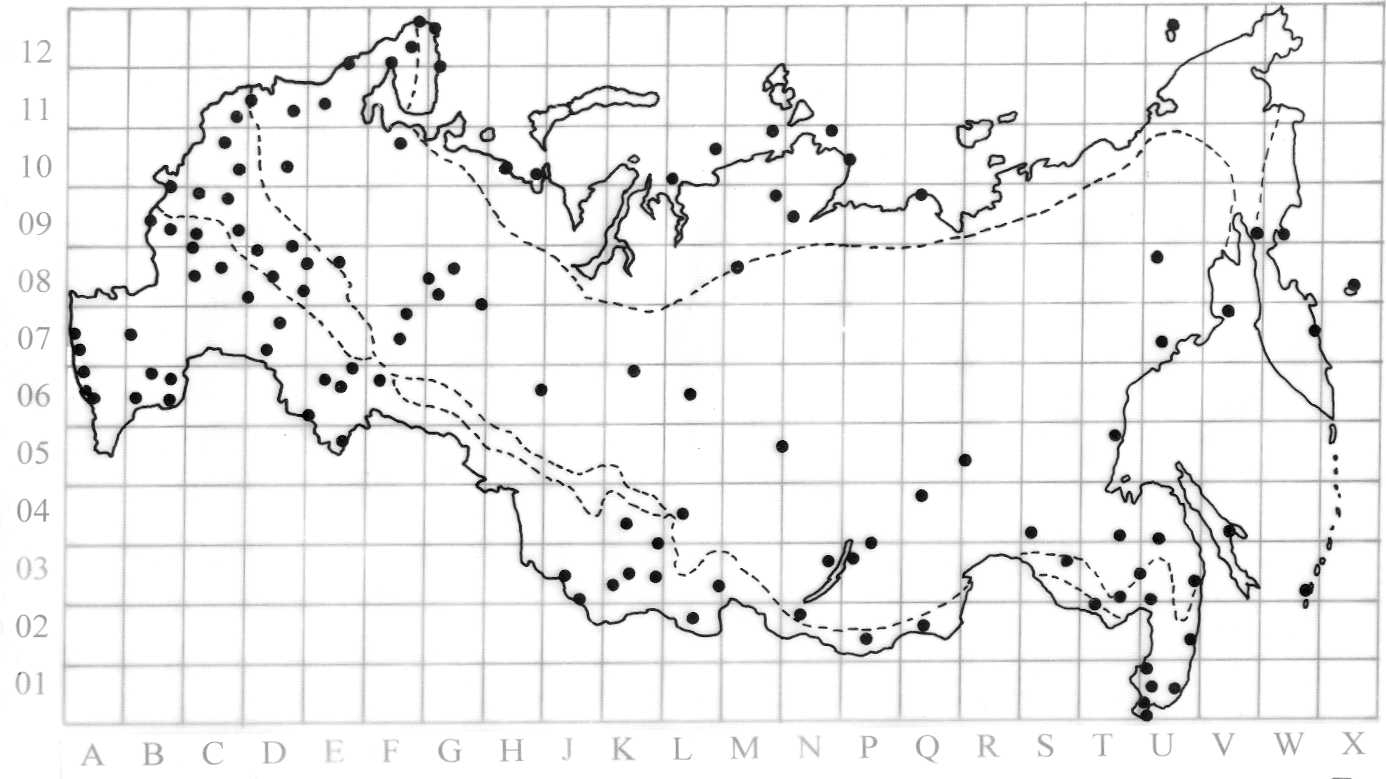
Map of zapovedniks in Russia

It is not easy to summarize the coverage of ecosystems protected by zapovedniks, but a rough idea can be gained by counting the number of reserves in the main natural-vegetation zones. On the map these are, from north to south:

- Arctic desert (treeless; no continuous vegetation cover) and tundra (treeless; small shrubs, sedges, mosses)
- taiga (coniferous boreal forest with admixture of birch and other deciduous trees)
- deciduous forest (discontinuous zone dominated by oak and other deciduous species)
- steppe (treeless, dominated by forbs in the north and grasses in the south).

This is a highly simplistic classification. Each major zone is divided into subzones, and there are transitional vegetation types. Moreover, many zapovedniks, especially if in a transitional zone or covering a range of altitudes, will contain examples of several vegetation types.

With those qualifications, the numbers of zapovednik sites (some zapovedniks occupy widely dispersed sites, some of which are here counted separately) in the different zones are as follows: Arctic desert and tundra – c.15; taiga – c.40; deciduous forest – c.13; steppe – c.30. About half a dozen are predominantly montane, especially in the Caucasus. Komandorsky and Wrangel Island are remote islands. A few are mainly wetlands.

== Management and uses ==
Although the principle of zapovednost' stipulates no economic use, in practice zapovedniks have often been required to contribute to the national economy. Voronezh Zapovednik, for instance, bred European beavers for reintroduction to other areas in support of the fur industry. Several zapovedniks have also been regarded as a breeding ground for other commercially valuable fur-bearing animals, such as sable and desman, allowing them to spread into neighboring unprotected areas to support commercial trapping.

Non-intervention management is difficult to practise in steppe zapovedniks, which are often far too small to support a self-sustaining ecosystem including wild herbivores (such as saiga) that may have been migratory. Resort is sometimes made to various mowing regimes, which however cannot satisfactorily replace natural processes insofar as it does not recycle nutrients and organic matter through the herbivore and carnivore food chain, and cannot replicate trampling effects.

An important activity in all zapovedniks is regular monitoring of seasonal events (phenology). This is now standardized in a programme of observations known as the Chronicle of Nature (Летопись природы). The name was suggested by Aleksandr Formozov in 1937 although a monitoring programme was being developed by V.N.Sukachev in 1914 and Grigorii Kozhevnikov in 1928. Instructions for conducting the Chronicle of Nature are periodically updated.

Under the pressure to become self-financing, some zapovedniks have tried at various times to develop ecological tourism - usually in the reserve's buffer zone, so avoiding infringement of the principle of zapovednost'. In some cases tourism does however become a serious problem on account of the proximity of recreation centres, e.g. at Teberdinsky Zapovednik in the Caucasus. The Dombai recreation center, long a favorite Russian alpine skiing destination, is located near the center of the zapovednik, and the impact of tourism in the area as more Russians and foreigners come to visit has created pressure on the preserved ecosystems around it.

== International significance of the zapovednik system ==
The anthropogenic impact on the environment - due to pollution, climate change and ultimately human population growth - is generating increasingly serious problems, the solution of which will depend on a better understanding of the biosphere than we already have. To provide conditions in which such an understanding can be developed, it is essential to preserve as far as possible intact examples of natural ecosystems, and the zapovedniks are the only large system of protected areas created primarily for this purpose. In the case of soil erosion, for example, it is only by comparing soil formation and loss rates from intact steppe or prairie and from the same kind of land under intensive agriculture that we can appreciate how destructive of natural capital the latter often is.

Regular long-term monitoring of natural phenomena in zapovedniks has also provided a baseline set of data which is now valuable for assessing how anthropogenic pressure, primarily through climate change, is affecting natural ecosystems. Since the latter perform essential functions such as carbon sequestration and nutrient cycling, it is obviously important to know how these ecosystem services are being affected by anthropogenic pressure.

== List of nature reserves ("Zapovedniks") in Russia ==
Name	Photo	Location	Website	Area	Year	Description
Altai	Altai Zapovednik	Altai Republic; 52°52′0″N 88°57′0″E	Park: Алтайский	881,238 ha (3,402.5 sq mi)	1932	Altai Mountains of south central Russia. Part of the UNESCO World Heritage Site "Golden Mountains of Altai".
Astrakhan	Astrakhan, Volga Delta	Astrakhan Oblast; 45°34′52″N 47°54′59″E	Park: Астраханский	66,816 ha (258.0 sq mi)	1919	Island and wetland area on the southwest corner of the Volga Delta. Reeds, cattails, willows. 50 species of fish, including beluga sturgeon.
Azas	Azas Zapovednik	Tuva; 52°28′12″N 96°8′11″E	Park: Азас	300,390 ha (1,159.8 sq mi)	1985	Located in the central part Todzha basin (an enormous intermountain trough within the Altai-Sayan mountain country) in northeastern Tuva and stretched along the Azas River.
Baikal	Baikalsky Zapovednik	Buryatia; 51°20′36″N 105°9′27″E	Park: Байкальский	165,724 ha (639.9 sq mi)	1968	On the southeast shore of Lake Baikal. Protects taiga and mountain habitats along the lake and the neighbouring central part of the Khamar-Daban Range.
Baikal-Lena	Baikal-Lena Zapovednik	Irkutsk Oblast; 55°13′0″N 107°45′0″E	Park: Байкало-Ленский	660,000 ha (2,548.3 sq mi)	1986	Located on the northwest coast of Lake Baikal, stretches along the western coast of Lake Baikal about 120 km, with an average width of 65 km.
Barguzin	Barguzin Zapovednik	Buryatia; 54°30′0″N 109°50′0″E	Park: Баргузинский	366,868 ha (1,416.5 sq mi)	1916	On the west slope of the Barguzin Range, including the northeast shores of the Lake Baikal, part of the lake and the Barguzin River.
Basegi	Basegi Zapovednik	Perm Krai; 58°3′0″N 58°2′0″E	Park: Басеги	37,935 ha (146.5 sq mi)	1982	Main rivers are: Usva River (northern border of nature reserve) and Vilva River (southern border). There are also some small rivers, such as the typical mountain rapids channels.
Bashkiriya	Bashkiriya Zapovednik	Bashkortostan; 53°20′44″N 57°46′40″E	Park: Башкирский	49,609 ha (191.5 sq mi)	1930	Central part of the Bashkir (Southern) Urals. Forested mountain slopes to the Kaga River; transition to steppe-forest.
Bastak	Amur Tiger in Bastak Zapovednik	Jewish Autonomous Oblast; 48°56′37″N 133°7′13″E	Park: Бастак	91,375 ha (352.8 sq mi)	1997	Located in the Amur River basin, the reserve's territory covers the south-eastern spurs Bureya ridge and the northern outskirts Sredneamurskaya lowlands. The reserve has been the site of successful reintroduction of the endangered Amur tiger.
Belogorye	Belogorye Zapovednik	Belgorod Oblast; 50°37′12″N 35°58′12″E	Park: Белогорье	2,131 ha (8.2 sq mi)	1935	Southwestern slope of the Central Hills on the Western edge of Russia. Cretaceous limestone landforms.
Bogdo-Baskunchak	Bogdo-Baskunchak Zapovednik	Astrakhan Oblast; 48°12′42″N 46°52′50″E	Park: Богдинско-Баскунчакский	18,780 ha (72.5 sq mi)	1997	Semi-arid area around Lake Baskunchak (a salt lake) and mountain Big Bogdo, just north of Volga Delta.
Bolon	Bolon Zapovednik	Khabarovsk Krai; 49°34′7″N 135°54′49″E	Park: Болоньский	103,000 ha (397.7 sq mi)	1997	Located on the Middle Amur lowlands adjacent to the south-west to Lake Bolon, the reserve covers the wetlands of international importance. Large numbers of migratory waterfowl use the area for nesting and stopovers on long flights.
Bolshekhekhtsirsky	Big Khekhtsir Ridge	Khabarovsk Krai; 49°34′7″N 135°54′49″E	Park: Большехехцирский	45,439 ha (175.4 sq mi)	1963	The reserve covers and is named for the Big Khekhtsir Ridge, about 20 km south of the city of Khabarovsk, in the Russian Far East. The reserve is noteworthy for its position close to a city and for being an island of mountain-forest biodiversity surrounded by lower river floodplains.
Botcha	Ikha River	Khabarovsk Krai; 48°8′11″N 139°13′16″E	Park: Ботчинский	267,380 ha (1,032.4 sq mi)	1994	The northernmost reserve inhabited by the endangered Amur tiger. The reserve is located in the north-eastern part of the Sikhote-Alin mountain range, it includes the Botchi River basin on its eastern slopes, in Sovetskaya Gavan Khabarovsk region.
Bryansk Forest	Bryansk Forest Zapovednik	Bryansk Oblast; 52°30′0″N 34°0′0″E	Park: Брянский Лес	12,186 ha (47.1 sq mi)	1987	One of the last remaining unbroken forests on the southern end of the European broadleaf forest, supporting abundant wildlife in the forests and bogs.
Bureya	Bureya Zapovednik	Khabarovsk Krai; 51°55′46″N 134°35′44″E	Park: Буреинский	358,444 ha (1,384.0 sq mi)	1987	Mountain tundra, lakes, rivers and lakes, larch forests, spruce-fir forests, thickets of Siberian pine, floodplain intrazonal forests. Located on the western edge of Khabarovsk Krai in the Russian Far East.
Caucasus	Caucasus Zapovednik	Krasnodar Krai; 43°50′10″N 40°24′3″E	Park: Кавказский им. Х.Г. Шапошникова	280,335 ha (1,082.4 sq mi)	1924	The biggest and oldest in the territory of specially protected natural area in the North Caucasus.
Central Black Earth	Central Black Earth Zapovednik	Kursk Oblast; 51°8′49″N 36°25′48″E	Park: Центрально-Чернозёмный	5,287 ha (20.4 sq mi)	1935	The reserve is located in the southwestern part of the Upland within the middle zone of forest-steppe zone, in the territory of Medvensky, Manturovsky and Gorshechensky District.
Central Forest	Central Forest Zapovednik	Tver Oblast; 56°27′18″N 32°58′36″E	Park: Центрально-Лесной	24,447 ha (94.4 sq mi)	1931	Located at the south-western part of the Valdai Hills, close to the divide between the drainage basins of the Atlantic (the Western Dvina and the Lovat) and the Caspian Sea (the Volga). The landscape within the nature reserve is mainly hilly, with a large area occupied by swamps.
Central Siberia	Central Siberia Zapovednik	Krasnoyarsk Krai; 62°21′25″N 90°39′51″E	Park: Центрально-Сибирский	1,021,469 ha (3,943.9 sq mi)	1985	Reserve "Tsentralnosibirsky" is one of the largest forest reserves in the world. Yenisei, Bakhta River and Podkamennaya Tunguska River. The Yeloguy River Nature Reserve is subordinated to it.
Chyornye Zemli	Saigas in Chyornye Zemli	Republic of Kalmykia; 46°2′0″N 46°8′0″E	Park: Чёрные земли	121,901 ha (470.7 sq mi)	1990	(In Russian, "Black Lands"). It was originally created in 1990 to protect the saiga antelope (Saiga tatarica).The main part of the reserve is located in the Caspian Depression, northwest of the Caspian Sea. The reserve also has colonies of egrets, cormorants, and rare pelicans.
Dagestan	Dagestan Zapovednik	Dagestan; 44°42′3″N 47°0′22″E	Park: Дагестанский	19,061 ha (73.6 sq mi)	1987	A wintering place for migratory birds, with sand dunes and ridges on the northwest coast of the Caspian Sea. The Sarah Kum sand dune is the highest sand dune in Europe, at 262 metres.
Dalnevostochny Morskoy	Dalnevostochny Morskoy Zapovednik	Primorsky Krai; 42°33′59″N 131°12′0″E	Park: Дальневосточный морской	64,316 ha (248.3 sq mi)	1978	Marine Reserve in Peter the Great Bay, Sea of Japan. For reserve enshrined four areas with different protection regimes total area of 64,311.6 hectares, including 63,000 hectares of sea area, and approved buffer zone around the maritime border width of 3 miles around the land - 500 metres.
Darwin	Darwin Zapovednik	Vologda Oblast; 58°35′0″N 37°59′0″E	Park: Дарвинский	11,267 ha (43.5 sq mi)	1945	Darwin Nature Reserve is located on Sheksna-Mologa Plain and is flat. Much of the area of the reserve is covered by coniferous forest (taiga) and swamps. In winter, swamps, rivers, and the Rybinsk reservoir stay frozen for several months
Dauriya	Dauriya Zapovednik	Chita Oblast; 50°4′0″N 115°39′0″E	Park: Даурский	44,752 ha (172.8 sq mi)	1987	Dry steppes and wetlands of Central Asia, in the Chita region.
Denezhkin Kamen	Denezhkin Kamen Zapovednik	Sverdlovsk Oblast; 60°30′29″N 59°29′39″E	Park: Денежкин камень	78,192 ha (301.9 sq mi)	1991	Centered on Denezhkin Stone Mountain, in the Central Ural Mountains, and surrounding rivers and forests. 38% taiga spruce-pine-fir forest, 12% pine forest, 35% mixed forest.
Dzherginsky	Dzherginsky Zapovednik	Buryatia; 55°6′51″N 111°27′32″E	Park: Джергинский	238,088 ha (919.3 sq mi)	1992	East of the north end of Lake Baikal, covers, the upper reaches of the Barguzin River at the junction of three major mountain ranges - the Barguzin, Ikat and South Muya ridges. Mountainous territory dominated by larch forests.
Dzhugdzur	Dzhugdzug Section (map)	Khabarovsk Krai; 57°6′15″N 138°15′26″E	Park: Джугджурский	859,956 ha (3,320.3 sq mi)	1990	Reserve on the coast of the Sea of Okhotsk, on the territory of Ayano-Maisky region of the Khabarovsk Territory. Includes the southern part of the coastal range and central part of the Dzhugdzhur Ridge, plus maritime additions.
East Ural	East Ural Zapovednik	Chelyabinsk Oblast; 55°48′52″N 60°53′58″E	Park: [ Восточно-Уральский]	16,600 ha (64.1 sq mi)	1968	A state "radiation reserve", located in the forest-steppe zone on the east slope of the southern Ural Mountains. Near site of the 1957 Kyshtym disaster, the second worst radiation release after Chernobyl.
Erzi	Erzi Zapovednik	Ingushetia; 42°45′0″N 45°0′0″E	Park: Эрзи	5,970 ha (23.1 sq mi)	2000	Located on the northern slope of the Greater Caucasus in the Dzheyrahsky Assinsky-basin, adjacent to the Rocky Ridge. Rivers in the reserve include the Assa and Armkhi that feed into the Terek River. The northern third of the territory is forested, the ridge area is alpine meadows and mountain steppe.
Galichya Gora	Galitsya Gora Zapovednik	Lipetsk Oblast; 52°36′5″N 38°55′42″E	Park: Галичья Гора	231 ha (0.9 sq mi)	1925	On the right bank of the Don is a famous Galich'ya Mountain, a unique natural landmark of Central Russia. It has long been known to this tract of the richness and variety of its flora and fauna.
Great Arctic	Great Arctic Zapovednik	Krasnoyarsk Krai; 75°30′0″N 92°36′0″E	Park: Большой Арктический	4,169,222 ha (16,097.5 sq mi)	1993	The largest reserve of Russia and Eurasia, as well as one of the largest in the world. Extensive sections of sea islands, peninsula and river basins.
Gydan		Yamalo-Nenets Autonomous Okrug; 71°50′35″N 78°12′23″E	Park: Гыданский	878,174 ha (3,390.6 sq mi)	1996	The northernmost reserve in Western Siberia. Covers the Gydansky Peninsula in the Yamalo-Nenets Autonomous Okrug.
Ilmen	Ilmen Zapovednik	Chelyabinsk Oblast; 55°0′55″N 60°9′32″E	Park: Ильменский	34,380 ha (132.7 sq mi)	1920	Started in 1920 as a mineralogical nature reserve, the site of deposits of many rare-earth minerals. 16 minerals were first discovered here. Pine and larch forests on low mountains; foothill ridges on east side of south Ural Mountains. 400 mines in the area in the past.
Kabardino-Balkaria	Kabardino-Balkaria Zapovednik	Kabardino-Balkar Republic; 43°2′56″N 43°14′33″E	Park: Кабардино-Балкарский	82,507 ha (318.6 sq mi)	1976	The main Caucasian ridge here forms the famous "Bezengi wall" consisting of the vertices Gestola (4859 m.), Katyntau (4858.8 m.), Dzhangi-Tau (5058 m.), Eastern Dzhangi-Tau (5033 m.) And Shkhara (5068 m. ). There are 256 glaciers in the reserve.
Kaluzhskiye Zaseki	Kaluzhskiye Zaseki Zapovednik	Kaluga Oblast; 53°35′26″N 35°47′17″E	Park: Калужские засеки	18,533 ha (71.6 sq mi)	1992	Zaseki is a Russian word suggesting 'barricade of fallen trees'. In medieval times, the Kaluga region was the defensive line between the Russian forests to the north, and potential invaders from the south. The reserve has been protected in some from for a thousand years, and remains unbroken forest.
Kandalaksha	Kandalaksha Zapovednik	Murmansk Oblast; 67°4′34″N 32°31′30″E	Park: Кандалакшский	70,530 ha (272.3 sq mi)	1932	Nature Reserve in the Murmansk region and Karelia. One of the oldest in Russia. Located on the coast and islands of the Barents Sea, and Kandalaksha Bay of the White Sea.
Katun	Katun Zapovednik	Altai Republic; 49°38′0″N 86°6′0″E	Park: Катунский	150,079 ha (579.5 sq mi)	1991	Highlands of the central Altai Mountains of south central Russia. Part of the UNESCO World Heritage Site "Golden Mountains of Altai".
Kedrovaya Pad	Kedrovaya Pad Zapovednik	Primorsky Krai; 43°6′18″N 131°30′45″E	Park: Кедровая Падь	17,900 ha (69.1 sq mi)	1925	Kedrovaya Pad is at the coastal spurs of the Manchurian mountains. The reserve's boundaries approach Barabashevka River (until 1973 Mongugay or Bolshoy Mongugay) in the northeast, and Narva River (until 1973 Sidimi) in the southwest. In the southeast, the Far Eastern Railway separates it from Amur Bay which is less than 5 km away
Kerzhenets	Kerzhenets Zapovednik	Nizhny Novgorod Oblast; 56°37′0″N 44°16′0″E	Park: Керженский	46,940 ha (181.2 sq mi)	1993	The reserve is located in the middle basin of the river Kerzhenets (a tributary of the Volga). Terrain is approximately half forest and half swamp.
Khanka	Sunset across Lake Khanka	Primorsky Krai; 45°0′0″N 132°9′0″E	Park: Ханкайский	43,679 ha (168.6 sq mi)	1990	Includes the waters of Lake Khanka and its coast. The territory is divided into 5 isolated areas.
Khakassia	Khakassia Zapovednik	Khakassia; 52°6′0″N 89°17′0″E	Park: Хакасский	267,483 ha (1,032.8 sq mi)	1999	Two large mountain areas (alpine and mountain-steppe), and a steppe group includes seven cluster sites located within the left bank of the Minusinsk depression.
Khingan	Khingan Zapovednik	Amur Oblast; 49°1′1″N 130°26′49″E	Park: Хинганский	93,995 ha (362.9 sq mi)	1963	Extreme south-east of the Amur region within Arkharinskaya lowlands (70%), and spurs Small Hinggan (30%). steppe and forest-steppe landscapes. Nesting Ussuri cranes.
Khopyor	Khopyor Zapovednik	Voronezh Oblast; 51°11′41″N 41°43′58″E	Park: Хопёрский	16,178 ha (62.5 sq mi)	1935	The territory stretches for 50 km along the Hopper River in Voronezh Oblast. About 80% of the area is covered by forests, dominated floodplain and upland oak woods, small areas of steppes and meadows. there are about 400 lakes and oxbows.
Kivach	Kivach Zapovednik	Republic of Karelia; 62°20′0″N 33°55′0″E	Park: Кивач	10,880 ha (42.0 sq mi)	1931	Includes the famous 10.7 m Kivach waterfall on the Suna River. The reserve was established in 1931 to study and protect Karelian taiga.
Kologrivsky Les	Kologrivsky Zapovednik	Kostroma Oblast; 58°56′0″N 43°51′0″E	Park: Кологривский лес	58,940 ha (227.6 sq mi)	2006	Dark conifer forest in the transition zone between northern and southern taiga, in the northeast of the Russian Plain, 350 km northeast of Moscow. Contains groves of old-growth spruce, and serves for both conservation and for scientific study of forest regeneration.
Komandor	Komandor Zapovednik	Kamchatka Krai; 54°0′0″N 165°0′0″E	Park: Командорский	3,648,679 ha (14,087.6 sq mi)	1993	Westernmost of the Aleutian Islands (most of which are in the US state of Alaska), the Commander Islands are treeless, sparsely populated islands 110 miles east of Russia's Kamchatchka peninsula.
Komsomolsk	Komsomolsk Zapovednik	Khabarovsk Krai; 50°48′36″N 137°43′9″E	Park: [ Комсомольский]	64,278 ha (248.2 sq mi)	1963	Covering the headwaters Gorin River, a left tributary of the Amur, in the Amur River Valley in Khabarovsk Krai in the Russian Far East.
Koryak	Koryak Zapovednik	Kamchatka Krai; 59°48′28″N 166°11′45″E	Park: Корякский	327,106 ha (1,263.0 sq mi)	1995	Located in the north of the Kamchatka peninsula, in the valley of the Kuyul River, the reserve includes the surrounding mountains of the Gauvin peninsula and adjacent waters in Lavrov Bay.
Kostomuksha	Kamennaya River	Republic of Karelia; 64°28′23″N 30°16′27″E	Park: Костомукшский	47,569 ha (183.7 sq mi)	1983	Forests, lakes and flowing bodies of water and other wetlands. Part of a transboundary reserve with Finland to the west.
Kronotsky	Kronotsky Zapovednik	Kamchatka Krai; 54°40′0″N 161°0′0″E	Park: Кроноцкий	1,142,134 ha (4,409.8 sq mi)	1967	Described as the 'Land of Fire and Ice', the reserve includes several mountain ranges with many volcanos - active and extinct - and Russia's only open geyser basin (the 'Valley of the Geysers').
Kurils	Kurils Zapovednik	Sakhalin Oblast; 45°5′0″N 145°59′0″E	Park: Курильский	65,364 ha (252.4 sq mi)	1984	The island of Kunashir and islands of the Lesser Kuril Ridge
Kuznetsk Alatau	Kuznetsk Alatau Zapovednik	Kemerovo Oblast; 53°45′0″N 89°15′0″E	Park: Кузнецкий Алатау	401,811.7447 ha (1,551.4 sq mi)	1989	Low-medium-high plateau in the Altai-Sayan mountain region in the south of Western Siberia. Kuznetsky Alatau is not a single mountain range and consists of several ranges of medium height, between which there are river valleys. It is a watershed of rivers Tom and Chuly
Lapland	Lapland Zapovednik	Murmansk Oblast; 67°49′0″N 32°28′0″E	Park: Лапландский	278,436 ha (1,075.0 sq mi)	1957	Lapland Biosphere Reserve is located in the northwest of Russia in the center of the western part of the Kola Peninsula. The relief of the reserve is characterized Lapland mountains (tundra), extended to the south-east of the border with Finland.
Lazovsky	Lazovsky Zapovednik	Primorsky Krai; 43°14′0″N 133°24′0″E	Park: Лазовский	120,989 ha (467.1 sq mi)	1957	Lazovsky Nature Reserve is located in the same district in the south-eastern part of Primorsky Krai, on the slopes of the Sikhote-Alin mountain range, facing the Sea of Japan. 95% forested, with the largest stand of yew trees in the Russian Far East.
Lena Delta	Lena Delta Zapovednik	Sakha Republic; 73°0′0″N 127°0′0″E	Park: Усть-Ленский	1,433,000 ha (5,532.8 sq mi)	1985	Located in the delta of the Lena River in Sakha Republic, in the far north of eastern Siberia, Russia.
Little Sosva	Little Sosva Zapovednik	Khanty-Mansi Autonomous Okrug; 62°4′59″N 62°5′47″E	Park: Малая Сосьва	225,562 ha (870.9 sq mi)	1976	The reserve "Malaya Sosva" is located in the Northern Urals in the territory of the West Siberian Plain. Sosvinsky Ob River; broken relief, a significant incision of river valleys, and a developed river system.
Magadan	Magadan Zapovednik	Magadan Oblast; 59°38′31″N 147°26′55″E	Park: Магаданский	883,817 ha (3,412.4 sq mi)	1982	Located in the south of the Magadan region near the northern shore of the Sea of Okhotsk. All sites are far away from each other, they have no settlements and transportation routes.
Mordovski	Mordovski Zapovednik	Mordovia; 54°49′15″N 43°20′26″E	Park: Мордовский им. П. Г. Смидовича	32,148 ha (124.1 sq mi)	1935	In the north of the Republic of Mordovia, on the right bank of the river Moksha, at the edge of coniferous - deciduous forests and steppe.
Nenets	Nenets Zapovednik	Nenets Autonomous Okrug; 68°35′35″N 53°45′27″E	Park: Ненецкий	313,400 ha (1,210.0 sq mi)	1997	Northern Arctic on the coast of the Barents Sea and the delta of the Pechora River, in the Nenets Autonomous Okrug. Abundant wetlands, rivers, and sea islands, provides habitat for thousands of migratory birds and other animals.
Nizhnesvirsky	Nizhnesvirsky Zapovednik	Leningrad Oblast; 60°36′0″N 33°0′0″E	Park: Нижнесвирский	42,390 ha (163.7 sq mi)	1980	Protects landscapes of the eastern shore of Lake Ladoga. The territory occupies lowlands on the right bank of the lower Svir River.
Nora	Nora Zapovednik	Amur Oblast; 52°30′4″N 130°17′33″E	Park: Норский	211,168 ha (815.3 sq mi)	1998	North-eastern part of the Amur-Zeya plain between the rivers Nora and Selemdzha. Widespread Chenopodiaceae woodlands and thermokarst of typical areas north of the Amur region.
North Ossetia	North Ossetia Zapovednik	North Ossetia-Alania; 42°47′0″N 44°5′0″E	Park: Северо-Осетинский	29,000 ha (112.0 sq mi)	1967	High mountain reserve located on the northern slope of the Caucasus Mountains within the heights of 650–4,249 meters. There are 76 glaciers in the reserve.
Nurgush	Nurgush Ridge South Ural	Kirov Oblast; 58°0′43″N 48°27′24″E	Park: Нургуш	23,449.7 ha (90.5 sq mi)	1994	One of the few intact forest landscapes of Northern European Russia, virtually untouched by human activities.
Oka	Oka Zapovednik	Ryazan Oblast; 54°45′0″N 40°45′0″E	Park: Окский	55,722 ha (215.1 sq mi)	1935	The main part of the reserve is located on the left bank of the River Pra. To reserve also includes the river Lamsha and Black. Plot widest floodplain Oka floodplain lakes.
Olyokma	Olyokma Zapovednik	Sakha Republic; 58°39′22″N 122°15′28″E	Park: Олёкминский	847,102 ha (3,270.7 sq mi)	1984	Located south of the middle reaches of the Lena River on the right bank of its second largest tributary - Olekma at the junction of the Aldan Highlands and Prilensky Plateau in Olyokminsky District of the Republic of Sakha (Yakutia).
Orenburg	Orenburg Zapovednik	Orenburg Oblast; 51°5′8″N 57°41′13″E	Park: Оренбургский	21,653 ha (83.6 sq mi)	1988	The purpose of the reserve - the preservation and restoration of the unique steppe landscapes of several similar areas - east of the Volga, Urals, Southern Urals and Trans-Urals.
Pasvik	Pasvik Zapovednik	Murmansk Oblast; 69°8′31″N 29°13′59″E	Park: Пасвик	14,727 ha (56.9 sq mi)	1992	A bilateral nature reserve located in the valley of the Pasvikdalen River in Norway and Russia. On the Russian side, the reserve a large pine forest area which is not directly related to Fjærvann Reservoir on the Norwegian side.
Pechoro-Ilych	Pechoro-Ilych Zapovednik	Komi Republic; 52°35′0″N 58°15′0″E	Park: Печоро-Илычский	721,322 ha (2,785.0 sq mi)	1930	In the south-eastern corner of the Komi Republic (Troitsko-Pechorsky District), on the western slopes of the Ural Mountains and the adjacent foothills and lowlands. The area is drained by the upper course of the Pechora River and its tributary Ilych.
Pinezhsky	Pinezhsky Zapovednik	Arkhangelsk Oblast; 64°40′36″N 43°11′57″E	Park: Пинежский	51,522 ha (198.9 sq mi)	1974	Taiga complexes southeastern White Sea-Kuloiplateau.
Polistovsky	Politovsky Zapovednik	Pskov Oblast; 57°10′15″N 30°33′25″E	Park: Полистовский	36,026 ha (139.1 sq mi)	1994	Protects bog ecosystems in northwest Russia, in the Polist-Lovat Swamp System.
Poronaysky	Poronaysky Zapovednik	Sakhalin Oblast; 49°03′30″N 144°21′00″E	Park: Поронайский	56,695 ha (218.9 sq mi)	1988	Nature Reserve in the eastern part of the island of Sakhalin. Includes Cape Patience, the southern part of the East Sakhalin Mountains, the widest part of the Tym-Poronaisk dale.
Privolshky Les	Pribolshky Les Zapovednik	Penza Oblast; 53°20′20″N 46°51′55″E	Park: Приволжская лесостепь	8,373 ha (32.3 sq mi)	1989	Steppe territory situated in the watershed between the Volga River and the Don River, the reserve contains 5 clusters (sections) located in the western part of the Volga Uplands on the territory of the Penza region.
Prioksko-Terrasny	Prioksko-Terrasny Zapovednik	Moscow Oblast; 54°54′13″N 37°32′48″E	Park: Приокско-Террасный	4,945 ha (19.1 sq mi)	1945	One of Russia's smallest zapovedniks (nature reserves), sprawling over an area of 5,000 hectares along the left bank of the Oka River in the Serpukhov District of Moskva Oblast.
Prisursky		Chuvash Republic; 55°2′0″N 46°45′0″E	Park: Присурский	9,150.4 ha (35.3 sq mi)	1995	Three parts: Alatyrski Nature Reserve, located in the valley of the river Sura (mixed coniferous and deciduous forests), and two small steppe sections to the southeast (Batyrevski Jaltsjikski.)
Putorana	Putorana Zapovednik	Krasnoyarsk Krai; 68°52′34″N 94°48′36″E	Park: Путоранский	1,887,251 ha (7,286.7 sq mi)	1988	Located in the centre of the Putorana Plateau, in the northern part of Central Siberia, located about 100 km north of the Arctic Circle. It contains complete subarctic and arctic ecosystems in an isolated mountain range.
Rdeysky	Rdeysky Zapovednik	Novgorod Oblast; 57°16′0″N 30°48′0″E	Park: Рдейский	36,922 ha (142.6 sq mi)	1994	The nature reserve is created to protect the raised bog ecosystems of the Northwestern Russia. Lake Rdeyskoye, a major lake at the northwest of the reserve of which a part of the shore belongs to the reserve, is the source of the Redya River, a major left tributary of the Lovat River.
Rostov	Rostov Zapovednik	Rostov Oblast; 46°27′53″N 43°3′2″E	Park: Ростовский	9,465 ha (36.5 sq mi)	1995	North-western part of Lake Manych-Gudilo islands, Burnt Islands and adjacent waters of the lake. Moderately dry Manych valley steppe.
Sayano-Shushenski	Sayano-Shushenski Zapovednik	Krasnoyarsk Krai; 52°7′44″N 91°47′34″E	Park: Саяно-Шушенский	390,368 ha (1,507.2 sq mi)	1976	Reserve in a remote area of the West Sayan in the south of the Krasnoyarsk Territory on the left bank of the Yenisei River in the area of influence of the Sayano-Shushenskoye reservoir.
Shaytan-Tau	Shatan-Tau Zapovednik	Orenburg Oblast; 51°47′17″N 57°25′3″E	Park: Шайтан-Тау	6,726 ha (26.0 sq mi)	2014	Located within the mountain range Shaytantau Southern Urals. The main purpose of the reserve is conservation Dubravnaya steppe as well as important habitats of rare species of plants and animals.
Shulgan-Tash	Kapova Cave in Shulgan-Tash	Bashkortostan; 53°2′N 57°3′E	Park:	22,531 ha (87.0 sq mi)	2014	Shulgan-Tash contains some of the oldest caves of human habitation (Kapova Cave), dated to 14–17 centuries BCE. The reserve is also famous for being the only reserve in the world for the ancient apiculture (bee-keeping) practice of tree-hollow cultivation of wild honeybees.
Sikhote-Alin	Sikhote-Alin Zapovednik	Primorsky Krai; 45°20′0″N 136°10′0″E	Park: Сихотэ-Алинский им. К.Г. Абрамова	401,428 ha (1,549.9 sq mi)	1935	A mountain range in Primorsky and Khabarovsk Krais, Russia, extending about 900 kilometres (560 mi) to the northeast of the Russian Pacific seaport of Vladivostok. Temperate forest and high biodiversity.
Sokhondo	Sokhondo Zapovednik	Chita Oblast; 49°41′37″N 111°5′27″E	Park: Сохондинский	210,985 ha (814.6 sq mi)	1973	One of the highest parts of Khentei-Chikoy Highlands with the Sokhondo Range. Golets Sokhondo is an ancient volcano. The reserve includes a number of lakes of glacial origin.
South Ural	South Ural Zapovednik	Bashkortostan; 54°20′48″N 57°53′9″E	Park: Южно-Уральский	252,800 ha (976.1 sq mi)	1979	Mountain taiga ecosystems in the highest part of the Southern Urals in the Republic of Bashkortostan and the Chelyabinsk region. several mountain ranges - Mashak, Zigalga, Nara Kumardak and Yamantau. Big Mountain Yamantau having a height of 1640 meters, is the highest mountain of the Southern Urals.
Taymyr	Taymyr Zapovednik	Krasnoyarsk Krai; 73°57′0″N 99°1′0″E	Park: Таймырский	1,781,928 ha (6,880.1 sq mi)	1979	Located on the Taimyr Peninsula in the Krasnoyarsk Krai. The area was established to the breeding grounds of the Red-breasted goose (Branta ruficollis protection) as well as the summer residences of wild reindeer (Rangifer tarandus) and the biodiversity of the Lake Taymyr.
Teberda	Teberda Zapovednik	Karachay-Cherkess Republic; 43°21′0″N 41°42′0″E	Park: Тебердинский	84,996 ha (328.2 sq mi)	1936	Located on the northern slopes of the Greater Caucasus Mountain Range. The terrain show extremes in variation: 31.7% forests, 20% meadows, 8.5% glaciers, 38.4% rock and scree, 0.7% - water (there are 157 lakes and 109 glaciers).
Tigireksky	Tigireksky Zapovednik	Altai Republic; 51°0′0″N 82°55′0″E	Park: Тигирекский	40,693 ha (157.1 sq mi)	1999	Southwestern part of the Altai Territory, including border. Tcherneva taiga and steppe; Karst landscape and caves.
Tunguska	Tunguska	Krasnoyarsk Krai; 60°43′53″N 101°58′3″E	Park: Тунгусский	296,562 ha (1,145.0 sq mi)	1995	Located in the central part of the Central Siberian Plateau. As a result of a meteorite in 1908, more than 2,000 km^{2} of boreal forest was felled and burned. The taiga affected in the disaster area has been restored in the past 100 years.
Ubsunur Hollow		Tuva; 50°41′0″N 94°2′0″E	Park: Убсунурская котловина	323,198.4 ha (1,247.9 sq mi)	1993	A fragile mountain hollow or depression located on the territorial border of Mongolia and the Republic of Tuvain the Russian Federation among the mountains — Tannu-Ola Mountains, and the Altay Mountains region — part of a combination of raised lands and depressions. Here the world's most northern desert meets the world's most southern tundra zone
Upper Taz	Upper Taz Zapovednik	Yamalo-Nenets Autonomous Okrug; 63°30′14″N 84°3′28″E	Park: Верхне-Тазовский	631,308 ha (2,437.5 sq mi)	1986	Located on the east-central edge of the West Siberian Plain, the territory is divided into two forests - Pokolskoe and Taz, protecting the left bank of the Ratta River.
Ussurisky	Ussurisky Zapovednik	Primorsky Krai; 43°40′49″N 132°32′44″E	Park: Уссурийский	40,432 ha (156.1 sq mi)	1932	Located on the southern spur of the Przewalski Mountains, in the upper reaches of the river Komarovka. In the east of the reserve are the headwaters of the right tributaries of the Artemivka River.
Vishera	Vishera Zapovednik	Perm Krai; 61°29′0″N 59°13′0″E	Park: Вишерский	241,200 ha (931.3 sq mi)	1991	More than 75% of which covered by forest, the main river is the Vishera River, which flows through a nature reserve about 130 km. Extreme north point of the nature reserve (that also the most northern in Perm Krai) is divided by basins of the Kama River, Pechora River and Ob River. Small population of this place is the Mansi people, that makes it an interesting ethnographic region.
Visim	Old Stone Mountain, in the buffer zone of Visim Zapovednik	Sverdlovsk Oblast; 57°24′25″N 59°33′55″E	Park: Висимский	33,487 ha (129.3 sq mi)	1971	Southern taiga low Middle Urals. Most of the reserve is located on its western slope in the headwaters of the Sulёm River, a right tributary of the Chusovoi River, part of the vast Volga-Kama basin.
Vitim	Towards east order of Vitim Zapovednik	Irkutsk Oblast; 57°12′10″N 116°48′28″E	Park: Витимский	585,021 ha (2,258.8 sq mi)	1982	Part of the Sayano-Baikal mountains and lakes area, northeast of Lake Biakal. Of particular scientific and cultural value is Lake Oron.
Volga-Kama	Volga-Kama Zapovednik	Tatarstan; 55°18′10″N 49°17′10″E	Park: Волжско-Камский	10,091 ha (39.0 sq mi)	1960	Volga-Kama Reserve. Located on the left bank of the terraces of the Volga River.
Voronezh	Voronezh Zapovednik	Voronezh Oblast; 51°44′8″N 39°34′9″E	Park: Воронежский	31,053 ha (119.9 sq mi)	1927	One of the oldest nature reserves in Russia is located 40 km north of the center of Voronezh. the world's first experimental beaver nursery for breeding and studying the beaver.
Voronina	Voronina Zapovednik	Tambov Oblast; 51°31′29″N 42°36′52″E	Park: Воронинский	10,819 ha (41.8 sq mi)	1994	Located in the valley of the Crow River (the right tributary of the river Hopper), forest-steppe zone, region.
Wrangel Island	Wrangel Island Zapovednik	Chukotka Autonomous Okrug; 71°14′0″N 179°25′0″E	Park: Остров Врангеля	2,225,650 ha (8,593.3 sq mi)	1976	An island in the Arctic Ocean, between the Chukchi Sea and East Siberian Sea. Wrangel Island lies astride the 180° meridian. It consists of a southern coastal plain that is as wide as 15 km (9.3 mi); a central belt of low-relief mountains; and a northern coastal plain that is as wide as 25 km (16 mi).
Yugansky	Jerginsky Zapovednik	Mari El Republic; 59°32′21″N 74°37′48″E	Park: Юганский	648,636 ha (2,504.4 sq mi)	1982	In the basin of the Big Yugan (left tributary of the Ob).
Zeya	Zeya Zapovednik	Amur Oblast; 53°57′46″N 127°22′21″E	Park: [ Зейский]	99,390 ha (383.7 sq mi)	1963	Mountainous territory on the eastern end of the Tukuringra Ridge. Taiga forest, larch, Mongolian oak.
Zhiguli	Zhiguli Zapovednik	Samara Oblast; 53°24′54″N 49°49′17″E	Park: Жигулёвский им. И. И. Спрыгина	23,157 ha (89.4 sq mi)	1966	Located on the Samara Bend in the Samara region, where the Volga River swings around the Zhiguli Mountains.

== UNESCO protection in Russia ==
=== Biosphere reserves ===
Since 1978, more than thirty of Russia's nature reserves have been designated by UNESCO as biosphere reserves.

=== World Heritage Sites ===
Some of the nature reserves in Russia are also protected by the UNESCO as natural World Heritage Sites:

- Lake Baikal (includes Barguzin, Baikal-Lena, Baikal Zapovedniks, three national parks and others protected areas);
- Western Caucasus (includes Caucasus Biosphere Reserve, others protected areas;in perspective also parts of Teberda Biosphere Reserve and Sochi National Park);
- Sikhote-Alin (includes Sikhote-Alin Zapovednik and others territories);
- Golden Mountains of Altai (includes Altai and Katun zapovedniks and others protected areas);
- Volcanoes of Kamchatka (includes Kronotski Zapovednik and four regional nature parks);
- Curonian Spit (includes Curonian Spit National Park);
- Virgin Komi Forests (includes Pechora-Ilych Biosphere Reserve and National Park «Yugyd va»);
- Uvs Nuur basin (includes Uvs Nuur Nature Reserve);
- Wrangel Island (includes Wrangel Island Zapovednik).

Typically, a nature reserve occupies only a part of the much larger World Heritage site.

== See also ==
- List of national parks of Russia
