= Orenburg Nature Reserve =

Strict nature reserve in Orenburg Oblast, Russia

- Russian: Оренбургский заповедник (Also: Orenburgsky)
- IUCN category Ia (strict nature reserve)
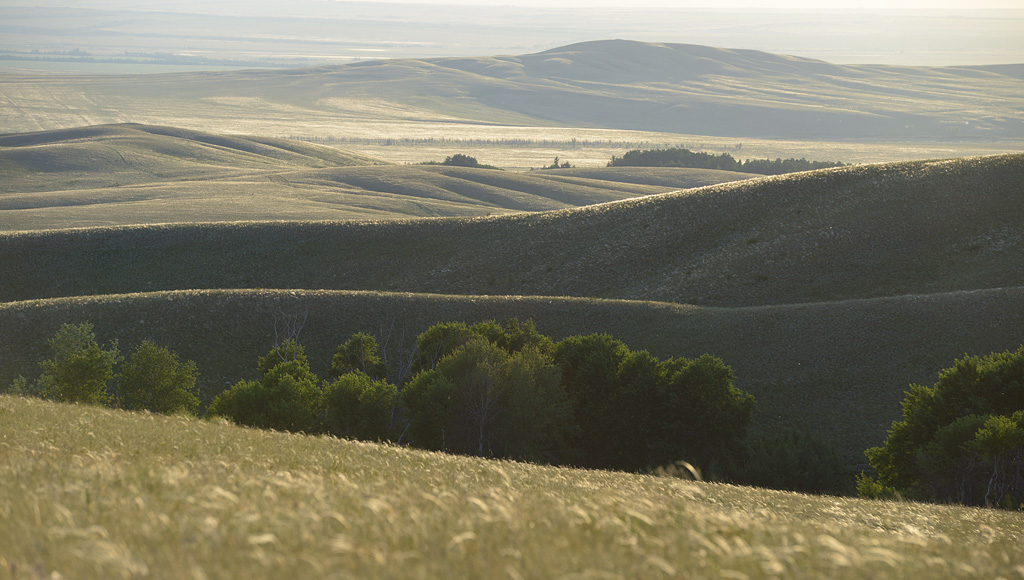
- Orenburg Zapovednik

- Location within Russia
- Location: Orenburg Oblast
- Nearest city: tbd
- Coordinates: 51°5′8″N 57°41′13″E
- Area: 21,653 hectares (53,506 acres; 84 sq mi)
- Established: 1988
- Governing body: Ministry of Natural Resources and Environment (Russia)
- Website: http://www.orenzap.ru/

Orenburg Nature Reserve (Russian: Оренбургский заповедник) (also Orenburgsky) is a Russian 'zapovednik' (strict nature reserve) dedicated to the preservation and restoration of four separate types of steppe landscape: Transvolga, Ural Mountains, Southern Urals and Trans-Urals. The reserve does this by spreading out across four sections across 400 km of steppes in Orenburg Oblast below the southern terminus of the Ural Mountains. The city of Orenburg sits in the middle of the four sectors, approximately 1,200 km southeast of Moscow. The reserve also protects historical and archaeological sites of the Sarmation people from the seventh to third century BCE. The reserve was formally established in 1988, and covers a total area of 21,653 ha (83.60 sq mi).

== Topography ==
The Orenburg Reserve is divided into four sectors that exhibit different ecological communities of the region:

- Talovskaya Steppe (3,200 ha). The westernmost sector, with no permanent streams or rivers. Terrain is softly undulating plain with gullies and ravines. Sarmation burial mound; populations of European Marmot, and nesting sites for the near-threatened Little bustard and the endangered Steppe eagle. There are large areas of erosion-resistant limestone and clay, or dark-brown soil.
- Burtinskaya Steppe (4,500 ha). Sector closer to the city of Orenburg, with more developed water sources and the upper reaches of several streams. Steppe landscape of fescue-feather grass and forb-fescue-feather grass communities. Karst lakes with waterfowl. Populations of marsh turtles. Complex of 13 Sarmation burial mounds, the largest of which is 40 meters in diameter and 2.5 meters in height. Low-humus heavy loam soil.
- Aytuarskaya Steppe (6,753 ha). Sector with South-Ural-Mountain-Steppe landscape of fescue-feather grass and forb-fescue-feather grass communities, with many springs. Mountainous area with tracts of aspen and black alder of unusually large size. The Aytuarka River flows along the western border. 16 Sarmation burial mounds. Karst topography with rocky outcrops and dark soil.
- Aschisayskaya steppe (7,200 ha). easternmost sector. Site of Lake Zhurmankol, with waterfowl that includes the Mute swan. Burial mound (20 meter diameter) of a nomadic tribe from the Middle Ages.

The reserve is in a border zone between the semi-arid lands of Kazakhstan to the south, and the forest-steppe to the north.

== Climate and ecoregion ==
Orenburg is located in the Pontic–Caspian steppe ecoregion. The Pontic steppe (after Euxeinos Pontos, the Black Sea), is a grassland that stretches from eastern Romania to Kazakhstan, across the northern edges of the Black Sea and Caspian Sea. It is an expansive prairie that is relatively flat and with fertile soil.

The climate of Orenburg is Humid continental climate, warm summer (Köppen climate classification (Dfa)). This climate is characterized by large swings in temperature, both diurnally and seasonally, with warm summers and cold winters. The area has very hot dry winds in the summer from central Asia. The average temperature ranges from −16 °C (3 °F) in January to 22 °C (72 °F) in July. Average precipitation ranges from 250 to 390 mm/year.

== Flora and fauna ==
The plant life of the reserve is a rich collection herbaceous plants (95% of the cover, of which 70% is perennials), with only 4% shrub cover. There are some meadow communities in moist hollows. Only 842 hectares in the reserve have woody vegetation, mostly alder, birch and aspen. Scientists on the reserve have recorded 1,350 species of vascular plants, from 110 families.

The animal life of the reserve reflects the location across several geographical zones, including steppe species, broad leaf forest species, and species of semi-desert ecosystems. Scientists on the reserve have recorded 48 species of mammals (half of which are rodents, notable the wood mouse and the steppe lemming), 193 of birds, 7 of reptiles, 5 of amphibians, and 6 species of fish. Rodents are the most common mammals.

In May 2016, the Orenburg reserve opened a Center for the reintroduction of the Przewalski Horse. The program includes the addition of a fifth sector to the reserve ("Ural Steppes").

== Ecoeducation and access ==
As a strict nature reserve, the Orenburg Reserve is mostly closed to the general public, although scientists and those with 'environmental education' purposes can make arrangements with park management for visits. There is an 'ecotourist' route in each of the four sectors of the reserve, however. These are open to the public, but require permits to be obtained in advance, and visits must be in the presence of a guide. The main office is in the city of Orenburg. The administration of the reserve is shared jointly with the Shaytan-Tau Nature Reserve

== See also ==
- List of Russian Nature Reserves (class 1a 'zapovedniks')
- National Parks of Russia
