= Nurgush Nature Reserve =

Strict nature reserve in Kirov Oblast, Russia

- Russian: заповедник Нургуш
- IUCN category Ia (strict nature reserve)
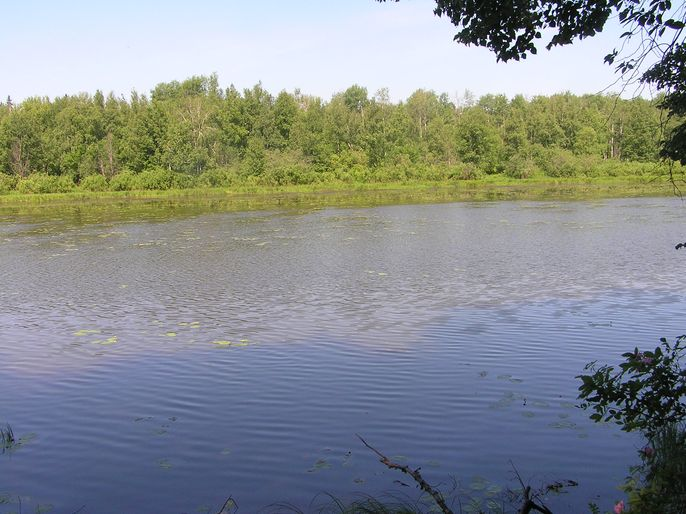
- Nurgush lake

- Location within Russia
- Location: Kirov Oblast
- Nearest city: Kirov
- Coordinates: 58°0′43″N 48°27′24″E
- Area: 5,918 hectares (14,624 acres; 23 sq mi)
- Established: 1994
- Governing body: Ministry of Natural Resources and Environment (Russia)
- Website: http://nurgush.org/

Nurgush Nature Reserve (Russian: Нургуш заповедник) is a Russian 'zapovednik' (strict ecological reserve) One of the few intact forest landscapes of Northern European Russia, virtually untouched by human activities. It is designed to protect the floodplain complexes of the Vyatka River, numerous lakes and coniferous-deciduous forests. The reserved is situated in the Kotelnichsky District of Kirov Oblast. The reserve was created in 1994, but has been a protected area since at least 1952 when it was organized as a beaver reserve; it covers an area of 5,918 ha (22.85 sq mi).

== Topography ==
The terrain of Nurgush is typical floodplain, occupying a broad meandering section of the Vyatka River. The highest elevation is 93 meters above sea level; the typical ground level above the Vyatka is 5–6 meters. Among the lowing rolling ridges are numerous ponds, vernal pools, oxbow lakes, and other forms of wetlands, and in the river sandbars, shoals, and small sandy islands. The area floods almost completely every spring for a few days. In non-flood times, about 20% of the territory is wetland. These areas are mostly forb-grass or sedge-grass. The reserve is located entirely on the floodplain, so it does not pick cover then entire local ecosystem; the surrounding elevated terraces are mostly forested in pine or spruce, but with widespread patches of alder and birch in disturbed areas.

== Ecoregion and climate ==
Nurgush is located in the Scandinavian and Russian taiga ecoregion. It is situated in Northern Europe between tundra in the north and temperate mixed forests in the south and stretches across Norway, Sweden, Finland and the northern part of European Russia.

The climate of Nurgush is Humid continental climate, warm summer (Köppen climate classification (Dfb)). This climate is characterized by large swings in temperature, both diurnally and seasonally, with mild summers and cold, snowy winters. Average annual temperature in January is -13.9 C, and +18 C in July. Average annual precipitation on the reserve is 583 mm.

== Flora and fauna ==
Forests cover 72% of the territory. The most common birch, aspen, alder forests and willow thickets. A quarter of the territory is covered with conifers. Scientists of the reserve and its buffer zone have observed 30 species of fish, 8 species of amphibians, 6 species of reptiles, 197 bird species (141 nesting, 38 migrating, 9 stray, 9 wandering), and 47 species of mammals.

The area has been protected from commercial activity at least since 1952, when the site was organized as a beaver reserve.

== Ecotourism ==
As a strict nature reserve, the Reserve is mostly closed to the general public, although scientists and those with 'environmental education' purposes can make arrangements with park management for visits. There are several 'ecotourist' routes in the reserve, however, that are open to the public, but require permits to be obtained in advance. The main office is in the city of Kirov.

== See also ==
- List of Russian Nature Reserves (class 1a 'zapovedniks')
- National parks of Russia
- Protected areas of Russia
