= Darwin Nature Reserve =

Nature reserve in Vologda and Yaroslavl Oblasts, Russia

- IUCN category Ia (strict nature reserve)
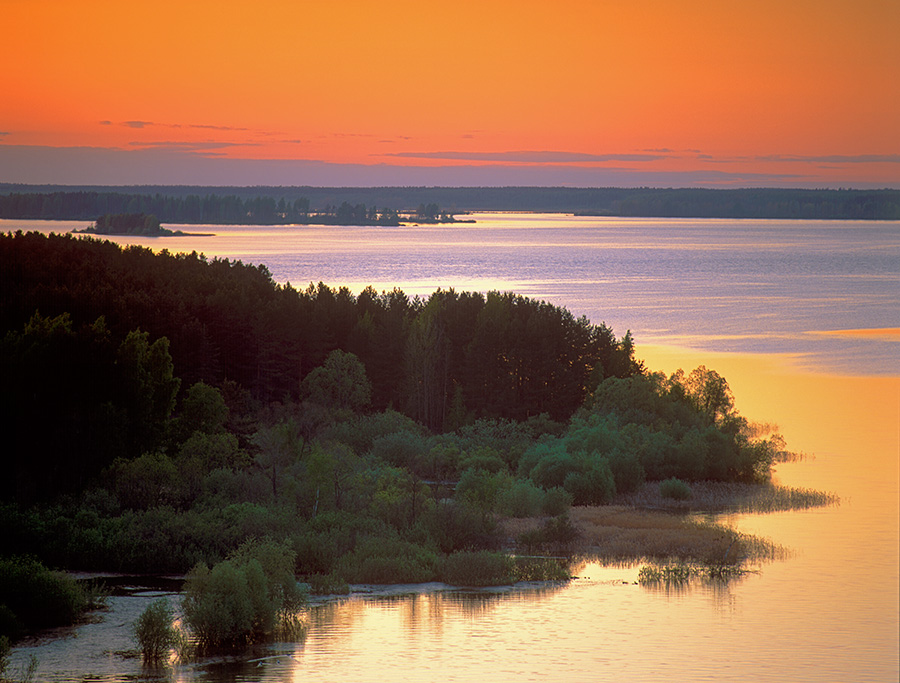

- Location within Russia
- Location: Russia
- Nearest city: Cherepovets
- Coordinates: 58°35′N 37°59′E
- Area: 1126.3 km^{2}
- Established: 1945

Darwin Nature Reserve, Darvinsky Zapovednik (Russian: Дарвинский заповедник) is a nature reserve (a zapovednik) in the north of Russia, located in Cherepovetsky District of Vologda Oblast and Breytovsky District of Yaroslavl Oblast, on the shores of the Rybinsk Reservoir of the Volga River. It was established July 18, 1945 to study the effects of raising freshwater level on the environment. It was named after Charles Darwin.

== History ==
In 1941, all preparatory work for construction of the Rybinsk Reservoir was completed, and the water level started to raise. The reservoir was full in 1947. Since further construction of big reservoirs was planned at the time, research on the effect of the creation of the reservoir on the environment was needed. To perform this research, the nature reserve was created on July 18, 1945.

In 1952 P. A. Petrov, Director of Darvinsky Zapovednik, denounced staff at the nature reserve and implicated Aleksandr Malinovskii, the head of the Main Administration of Zapovednik. This led to an investigation in Darvinsky Zapovednik which vindicated Malinovskii and to the humiliation of Petrov.

Since 1963, the nature reserve additionally performs the research on capercaillies to facilitate breeding of these birds.

== Location and geography ==
The nature reserve occupies the northwestern part of the reservoir. Of the total area of 1,126.3 square kilometres (434.9 mi^{2}), 671.8 square kilometres (259.4 mi^{2}) is occupied by land, and the rest is occupied by water. Approximately two thirds of the reserve are located in Vologda Oblast and one third is located in Yaroslavl Oblast. The major part of the area which belongs to Vologda Oblast is a peninsula in the Rybinsk Reservoir.

Darwin Nature Reserve is located on Sheksna-Mologa Plain and is flat. Much of the area of the reserve is covered by coniferous forest (taiga) and swamps. In winter, swamps, rivers, and the Rybinsk reservoir stay frozen for several months.

The addition of the reservoir to the landscape considerably altered the climate. In particular, the principal winds are flow currently from the northwest, as compared with southern and southwestern winds dominated previously.

Among other the features related to human activity there are peat islands on the Rybinsk reservoir, which were formed as a consequence of the erosion of the bottom of the reservoir. Peat, which was deposited below the soil, floats and forms the islands. Another feature are the wells used to burn coal in the 18th century. A number of villages went under water when the reservoir was being filled, and some of the villages are still marked by islands with groups of trees.

== Fauna ==
Large mammals resident in the nature reserve include brown bear, gray wolf, moose, and wild boar.
