= Grigorii Kozhevnikov =

Grigorii Aleksandrovich Kozhevnikov
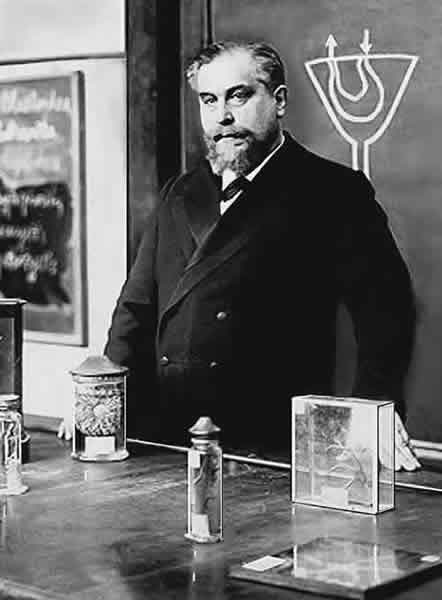
- Kozhevnikov in about 1910
- Born: 1866
- Died: 1933 (aged 66–67)
- Citizenship: Russian Empire, Soviet Union
- Scientific career
- Fields: Entomology
- Institutions: Moscow State University

Grigorii Aleksandrovich Kozhevnikov (15 (27) September 1866 – 29 January 1933) was a Russian and Soviet entomologist.

In 1904 Kozhevnikov was appointed professor at Moscow University and became director of their zoological museum. He was particularly involved in the study of bees and initiated the study of the Anopheles genus of mosquito.

Kozhevnikov was one of the foremost proponents of zapovedniki, a series of inviolable nature reserves which would serve as a control group in relationship to areas of human inhabitation which would allow scientists to test the impact of human activity on the environment.
