= Mordovski Nature Reserve =

Nature reserve in Mordovia, Russia

- Russian: Мордовский им. П. Г. Смидовича заповедник (Also: Mordovsky)
- IUCN category Ia (strict nature reserve)
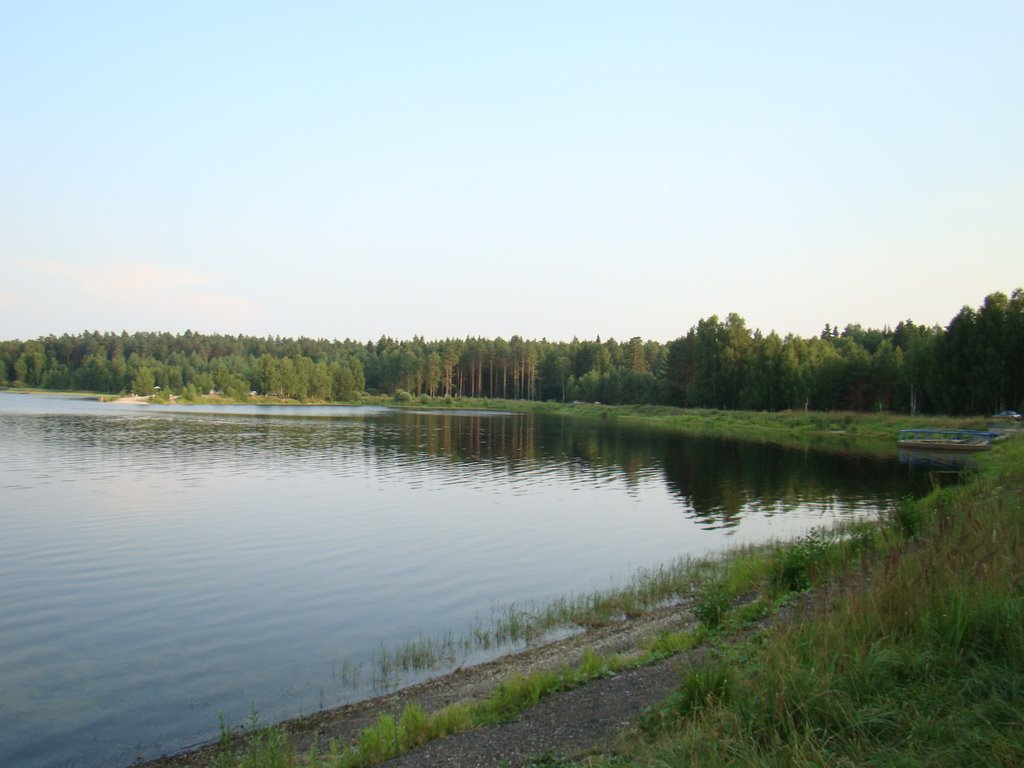
- Mordovski Zapovednik

- Location within Russia
- Location: Mordovia
- Nearest city: Sarov
- Coordinates: 54°49′15″N 43°20′26″E
- Area: 32,148 hectares (79,439 acres; 124 sq mi)
- Established: 1935
- Governing body: Ministry of Natural Resources and Environment (Russia)
- Website: http://www.zapovednik-mordovia.ru/ru/

Mordovski Nature Reserve (Russian: Мордовский им. П. Г. Смидовича заповедник) (also Mordovsky) is a Russian 'zapovednik' (strict nature reserve) in the north of the Republic of Mordovia, on the forested right bank of the Moksha River. It is in the transition zone of coniferous-deciduous forests and steppe. The reserve covers one-sixth of the Temnikovsky District of Mordovia. It was formally established in 1935, and covers a total area of 32,148 ha (124.12 sq mi). Its official name honors Pyotr Smidovich, a Soviet revolutionary and government official who was instrumental in establishing the Mordovsky Reserve.

== Topography ==
The Mordovski Reserve's terrain reflects the retreating glaciers of the Moksha River plain: belts of sandy soils, terraces, moraines, and scattered sinkholes (some of which reach a diameter of 30 meters). The reserve is crossed by a network of small rivers. The Moksha River, a tributary of the Oka River, flows from east to west along the southern border of the reserve. The Satis River flows from north to south along the northern border to meet the Moksha. To the south of the territory is the transition to the steppe zone.

== Climate and ecoregion ==
Mordovski is located in the Sarmatic mixed forests ecoregion. This ecoregion is a belt of forest running from southern Norway, across European Russia to the Ural Mountains. The region lies between boreal forests/taiga in the north and the broadleaf belt in the south. The ecoregion is characterized by mixed forests dominated by oak (Quercus robur), Norway spruce (Picea abies), and pine (Pinus sylvestris) in drier areas.

The climate of Mordovski is Humid continental climate, warm summer (Köppen climate classification (Dfb)). This climate is characterized by large swings in temperature, both diurnally and seasonally, with mild summers and cold, snowy winters. The average annual precipitation is 530 mm/year; average snow depth is 50–60 cm. The frost-free period is 120–135 days, from May to September.

== Flora and fauna ==
The plant life of the reserve is mostly forest (96.6%), both pine forest and mixed forest (spruce, aspen, basswood, black alder). The sandy soils are especially favorable for pine. The floodplain of the Moksha River also has oak and alder communities. Grasslands are mainly floodplain, upland little. Scientists for the reserve have recorded 788 species of vascular plants, 77 of moss, and 136 of lichens.

With extensive wetlands and forest, the reserve is known for scientific study of insects, of which over 1,500 species have been studied within the borders, and the inventory is far from complete. The animal life of the reserve reflects the richness of the wetlands in particular: 32 species of fish (including tench, Northern pike, European perch, and Moderlieschen) are found, and 10 species of amphibians (newts, frogs, and toads, including the European fire-bellied toad. The reserves feature a variety of mammals that reflect the different ecozones meeting in the region: brown bear and moose of the European taiga, squirrels, moles and martens of the mixed deciduous forests. Scientists on the reserve have recorded 60 species of mammals. 216 species of birds have been recorded.

== Ecoeducation and access ==
As a strict nature reserve, the Mordovski Reserve is mostly closed to the general public, although scientists and those with 'environmental education' purposes can make arrangements with park management for visits. Tourists area welcome, however, on "ecotourist' routes in the reserve. Permits to these may be obtained in advance. There is a public nature museum and main office in the village of Pushta.

== See also ==
- List of Russian Nature Reserves (class 1a 'zapovedniks')
- National Parks of Russia
