= Dzhugdzur Nature Reserve =

Nature reserve in Khabarovsk Krai, Russia

Dzhugdzursky Nature Reserve
- Russian: Джугджурский заповедник (Also: Dzhugdzhur)
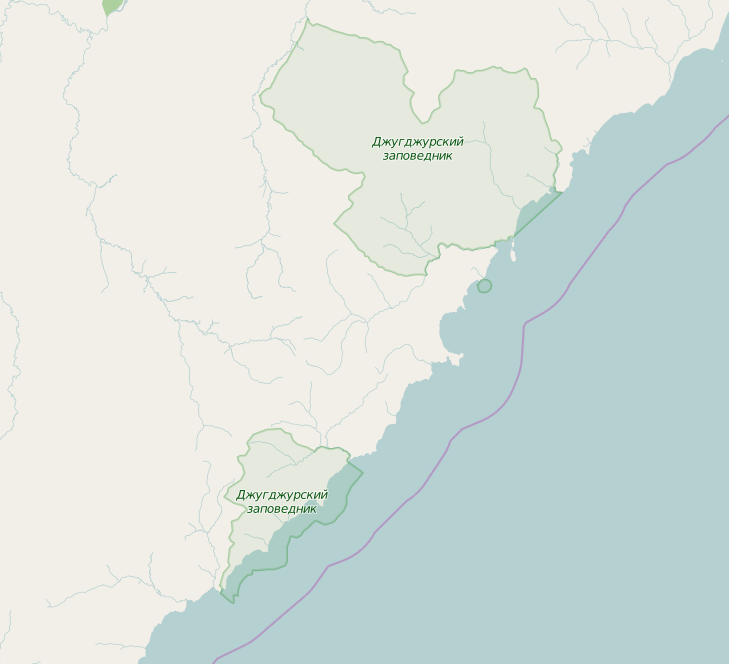
- Dzhugdzursky Reserve Boundaries, on North coast of Okhotsk Sea

- Location within Russia
- Location: Khabarovsk Krai
- Nearest city: Ayan, Russia
- Coordinates: 57°6′15″N 138°15′26″E
- Area: 859,956 hectares (2,124,998 acres; 3,320 sq mi)
- Established: 1990
- Governing body: Ministry of Natural Resources and Environment (Russia)

Dzhugdzursky Nature Reserve (Russian: Джугджурский заповедник) is a Russian 'zapovednik' (strict ecological reserve) on the coast of the Sea of Okhotsk, on the territory of Ayano-Maisky region of the Khabarovsk Territory in the Russian Far East. With over 8,000 km2 of land area and over 500 km2 of marine area, it is the largest of the six nature reserves in Khabarovsk Krai. It supports spawning streams into the Okhotsk Sea for chum, pink salmon and coho salmon.

== Topography ==
Geographically, Dzhugdzur is in the region known as the "Priokhot'e" ("Against the Okhotsk"), the area on the immediate west and northwest coast of the Okhotsk Sea. The Dzhugdzursky Mountains run from the southwest to the northeast, up the northern coast of the Okhotsk Sea and continuing for some 1,500 km to the northeast. The area is remote, with few settlements or town; the reserve is 1,447 km from the capital city of Khabarovsk. The reserve itself is broken into three sections - the "Dzhugdzhur", the "Coastal", and the "Islands of Malmo".

The northern section (Dzhugdzur) is bisected by the Dzhugdzur Ridge, which reaches 1,400 to 1,800 meters in height. The southeastern part of the Dzhugdzurksy section is a series of mountain spurs to the coastal strip and is very hard to access. The highest point in the northern section is Mt. Topko (1,906 meters). The southern section of the reserve ("Coastal") is a ridge of 600–800 meters that drops precipitously to the Okhotsk Sea coast. Along the entire ridge there is only one river cut (the Lantar River valley), and the rocky sea cliffs make this section also very hard to access.

== Climate and ecoregion ==
Dzhugdzursky is located at the far eastern extreme of the East Siberian taiga ecoregion, a large region stretching from the Yenisei River to the Lena River system and southeast to the Okhotsk Sea. The region's northern border reaches the Arctic Circle, and its southern border reaches 52°N latitude. The dominant vegetation is light coniferous taiga with Dahurian larch (Larix gmelinii forming the canopy in areas with low snow cover. The ecoregion is rich in minerals.

The climate of Dzhugdzursky is cold semi-arid (Köppen climate classification (ET)). This is a local climate in which at least one month has an average temperature high enough to melt snow (0 °C (32 °F)), but no month with an average temperature in excess of 10 °C (50 °F).

Ice in the Sea of Okhotsk can remain well into June or even July. Thus, the surface water temperature rises slowly and may only reach 10-12 C degrees in the summer. As a result, the coastal region of Dzhugdzursky has a summer that is short, cold, and wet. There are on average 50 days of fog per year on the coast, with frequent rain and drizzle.

== Flora and fauna ==
The northernmost zone, Dzhugzhur, is mostly larch forest, representative of the ecoregion, with some Scots pine. The coastal regions of the reserve have flora characteristic of the Okhotsk-Kamchatka region. The harsh climate (cold, wet, and with strong northwesterly winds in winter) is nevertheless supportive of a wide range of bird species: 185 species of birds have been recorded in the reserve, with 126 nesting in the territory.

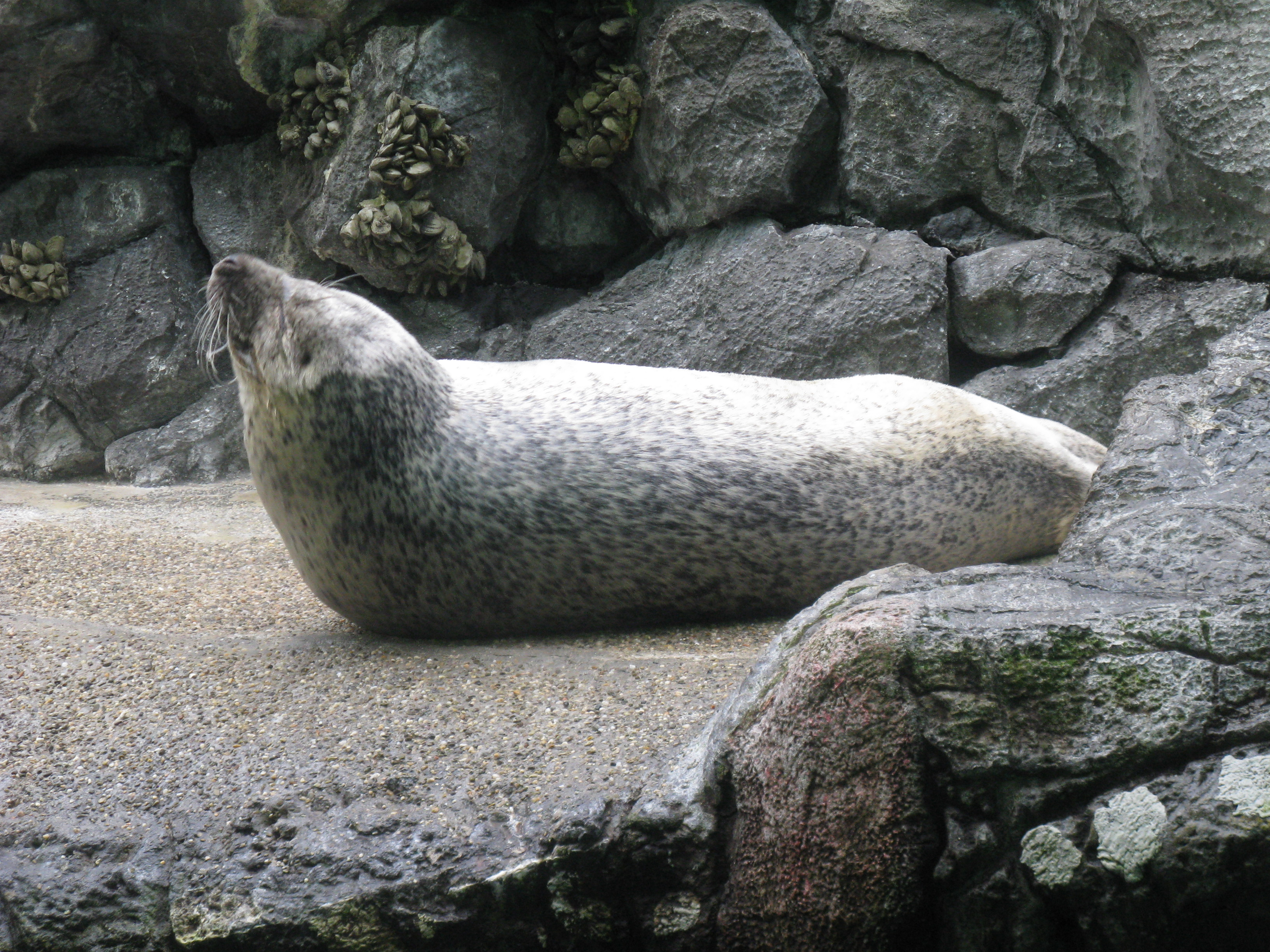
Spotted seal. Dzhugdzursky Reserve coastal region supports a wide range of seals

The animals of the reserve are those found in the meeting of the East Siberian taiga (sable, brown bear, wolverine, moose), the Arctic (ptarmigan, Rough-legged Buzzard), and the Asian (including bighorn sheep). On the Okhotsk Sea coast are a variety of pinnipeds (that is, seals): Ringed seal (Akiba), Spotted seal (Larga), and Bearded seal.

== Ecotourism ==
As a strict nature reserve, the Dzhugdzursky Reserve is mostly closed to the general public, although scientists and those with 'environmental education' purposes can make arrangements with park management for visits. The reserve does allow for limited public 'ecotourist' excursions on certain routes accompanied by reserve rangers, but requires application for permits to be submitted in advance for approval.

== See also ==
- List of Russian Nature Reserves (class 1a 'zapovedniks')
- National parks of Russia
- Protected areas of Russia
