= Chyornye Zemli Nature Reserve =

Nature reserve in Kalmykia, Russia

Chornye Zemli Nature Reserve
- Russian: заповедник Чёрные земли
- IUCN category Ia (strict nature reserve)
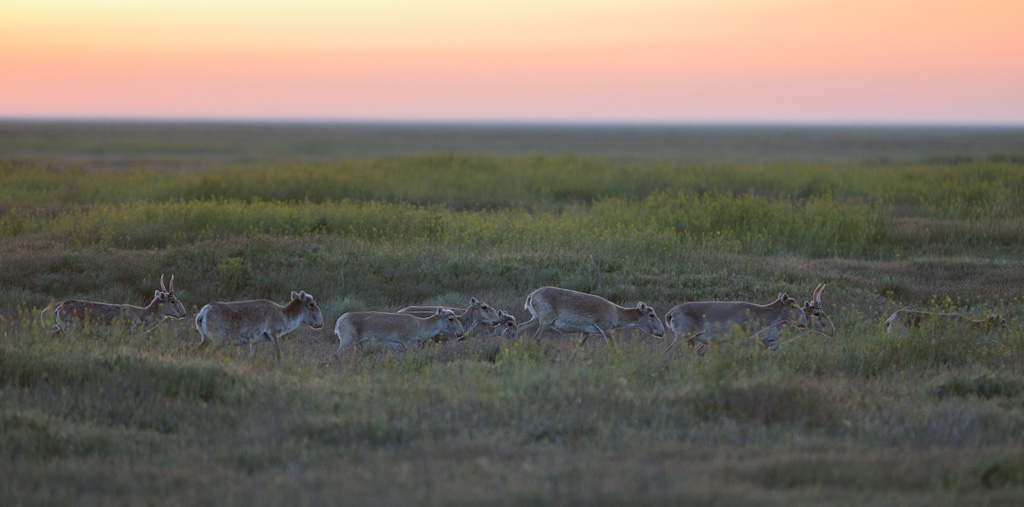
- Saiga in Chornye Zemli Nature Reserve

- Location within Russia
- Location: Republic of Kalmykia
- Nearest city: Astrakhan
- Coordinates: 46°2′N 46°8′E
- Area: 121,901 acres (493.32 km^{2})
- Established: 1990
- Governing body: Ministry of Natural Resources and Environment (Russia)
- Website: http://zapovednik-chernyezemli.ru/

Chornye Zemli Nature Reserve (Russian: заповедник Чёрные земли) is a Russian 'zapovednik' (strict nature reserve). The name in Russian means "Black Lands". The main part of the reserve is located in the Caspian Depression, northwest of the Caspian Sea. It was originally created in 1990 to protect the saiga antelope (Saiga tatarica). In the meantime, the economy of Kalmykia collapsed and the numbers of saiga have crashed due to poaching for meat and horns (Chinese medicine) and desertification caused by overgrazing by domestic animals. The reserve also has colonies of egrets, cormorants, and rare pelicans. The reserve is situated in the Chernozemelsky District of Republic of Kalmykia. It was created in 1990, and covers 1,219 km^{2} in two locations, with a 900 km^{2} buffer zone.

From 1993 to 2021, Cherny Zemli Nature Reserve was designated as one of UNESCO biosphere reserves.

== Ecoregion and climate ==
Chornye Zemli is located in the middle of the Caspian lowland desert ecoregion, a region that covers the north and southeast coasts of the Caspian Sea, including the deltas of the Volga River and Ural River in the northern region. Although precipitation is relatively low (less than 200 mm/year), wildlife is supported by the river systems and sea itself.

The climate of Chornye Zemli is cool semi-arid (Köppen climate classification BSk). This climate is characterized by high variation in temperature, both daily and seasonally; with low precipitation.

== See also ==
- List of Russian Nature Reserves (class 1a 'zapovedniks')
- National parks of Russia
- Protected areas of Russia
