= Anyuiskiye Perekaty =

Anyuiskiye Perekaty (Russian: Анюйские перекаты) is a newspaper published from Troitskoye, Khabarovsk Krai, Russian Federation.

It is one of the oldest local newspapers in Khabarovsk Krai. The newspaper was founded on November 7, 1935, and was called Sikun Pokto (Сикун покто, 'New Path' in Nanai language). Sikun Pokto was a two-page newspaper published from the Naikhin village, with V. Onenko as its editor. However, soon after its foundation the newspaper editorial office was shifted to the Troitskoye village, which served as the administrative centre of the Nanaysky District. The name of the newspaper was changed to Stalinsky Put (Сталинский путь, 'Path of Stalin'). It was the organ of the Nanaysky District Committee of the Communist Party and the District Soviet of People's Deputies. Between 1939 and 1943 the newspaper had a Nanai language edition, called Stalin Poktoni (Сталин поктони). It was the sole Nanai language newspaper published in the Soviet Union during this period.

51 issues were published in 1937, 54 issues in 1938, 83 issues in 1939, 110 issues during 1940-1941, 99 issues in 1942, 64 issues in 1943, 52 issues in 1944, 54 issues in 1945, 72 issues in 1946, 57 issues in 1947, 52 issues during 1948-1949, 60 issues in 1950, 56 issues in 1951, 90 issues in 1952, 103 issues in 1953, 105 issues in 1954, 103 issues during 1955-1956. As of 1937 it had a circulation of 300 copies, the following year circulation stood at 650 copies, in 1939 840 copies and by 1940 the circulation of the newspaper was a 1,000 copies.

The last issue using the name Stalinsky Put was published on November 7, 1956. The newspaper was then renamed Krasnoye Znamya (Красное знамя, 'Red Banner'). 105 issues were published in 1957, 153 issues in 1958, 154 issues in 1959 and 155 issues in 1960.

Publishing of Krasnoye Znamya was suspended during 1963-1964, as there was a administrative territorial realigment in Khabarovsk Krai. Nanaysky and Komsolmolsky Districts were merged, but then in August 1964 Nanaysky District was re-established. In 1965 publication of Krasnoe Znamya resumed from Troitskoye. On September 7, 1991 the ownership of Krasnoye Znamya was restructured, being shared between the Nanaysky District Administration, the Soviet of People's Deputies and the employees of the editorial office of the newspaper. In 1994 the name Anyuiskiye Perekaty (a name referencing the Anyuy river) was adopted.
