= Okhotsk–Manchurian taiga =

Ecoregion in the Russian Far East

Okhotsk-Manchurian taiga
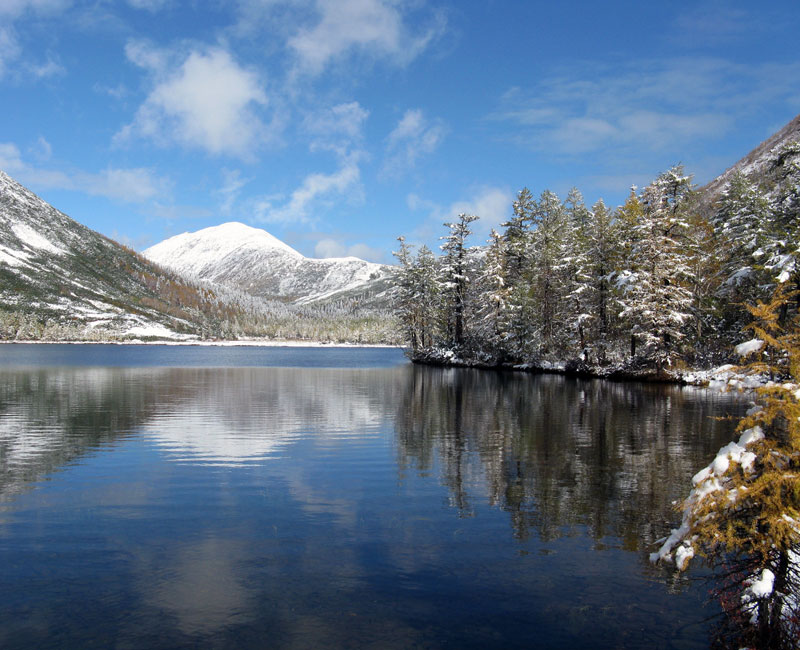
- Lake Korbohon, Bureinsky Nature Reserve

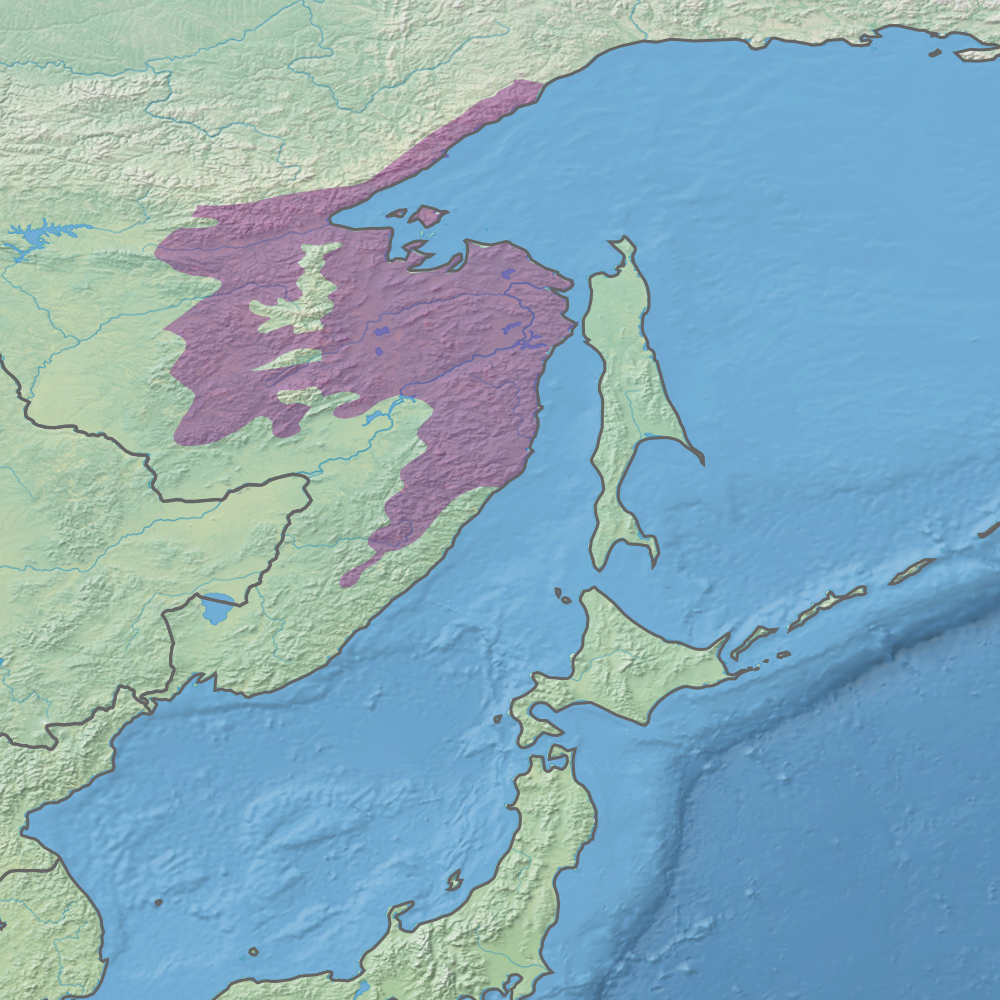
- Ecoregion territory (in purple)

Ecology
- Realm: Palearctic
- Biome: boreal forests/taiga

Geography
- Area: 401,900 km^{2} (155,200 sq mi)
- Country: Russia
- Coordinates: 52°15′N 136°15′E
- Rivers: Amur River
- Climate type: Koppen (Dwb)

The Okhotsk-Manchurian taiga ecoregion (WWF ID: PA0606) is an area of coniferous forests in the Russian Far East, covering the Amur River delta, the west coast of the Okhotsk Sea, and the rugged extension of the northern Sikhote-Alin Mountains that run southwest-to-northeast through the Primorsky and Khabarovsk regions. It is the southernmost taiga forest in Eurasia. The ecoregion is distinguished from surrounding ecoregions by the slightly warmer climate due to the maritime influence and the shield of the mountains to the west, and by the mixing of flora and fauna species from Okhotsk-Kamchatka communities to the north and Manchurian species from the south. The forest at lower altitudes is "light taiga" (mostly larch), and "dark taiga" (spruce and fir) at higher altitudes.

== Location and description ==
The ecoregion covers an area about 700 km west–east by 1,200 km north–south, the north–south distance being extended by long narrow strips along the coast of the Sea of Okhotsk to the north, and down the spine of Sikhote-Alin to the south. The Amur River delta and Sikhote-Alin Mountains run through the center of the ecoregion, meeting at the Sea of Okhotsk and the Shantar Islands offshore. To the west is the Manchurian mixed forests ecoregion, an area of low hills with cover of pine and deciduous forest. The eastern edge is the Sea of Okhotsk and the Sakhalin Gulf. To the north is the East Siberian taiga ecoregion, a colder region of larch forest and less snow. The Ussuri broadleaf and mixed forests ecoregion lies to the south, with warmer temperatures and mixed broadleaf forests.

== Climate ==
The climate of the Okhotsk-Manchurian taiga is Humid continental climate, warm summer (Köppen climate classification (Dwb)), with a dry winter. This climate is characterized by large seasonal temperature differentials and a warm summer (at least four months averaging over 10 °C (50 °F), but no month averaging over 22 °C (72 °F), and cold winters having monthly precipitation less than one-tenth of the wettest summer month.

Center of Okhotsk-Manchurian ecoregion (52.25 N, 136.25 E)

Climate chart (precipitation, max. and min. temperature)
J	F	M	A	M	J	J	A	S	O	N	D
10 −21 −34	7.6 −14 −29	10 −5 −19	28 6 −6	46 15 2	64 22 8	94 25 12	99 23 12	81 17 6	43 7 −3	20 −7 −19	13 −19 −30
- █ Average max. and min. temperatures in °C
- █ Precipitation totals in mm
- Source: GlobalSpecies.org
Imperial conversion
J	F	M	A	M	J	J	A	S	O	N	D
0.4 −6 −29	0.3 7 −20	0.4 23 −2	1.1 43 21	1.8 59 36	2.5 72 46	3.7 77 54	3.9 73 54	3.2 63 43	1.7 45 27	0.8 19 −2	0.5 −2 −22
- █ Average max. and min. temperatures in °F
- █ Precipitation totals in inches

Average temperatures range from −27 °C (−17 °F) in January to 18.3 °C (64.9 °F) in July. The wind blows from the east (sea to land) during the warm period, bringing 80-90% of the precipitation, and blows west to east (from Siberia towards the sea) during the cold season.

== Flora ==
The Okhotsk-Manchurian taiga ecoregion is the most southern of the boreal ecoregions; the dominant forest cover is dark taiga (spruce and fir) at high altitudes, and larch at lower altitudes. The region is farther north, and higher than, the Ussuri broadleaf and mixed forests ecoregion which supports Mongolian oak and other broadleaf species. 36% of the territory is closed deciduous needle-leaf forest, 19% is closed evergreen needle-leaf forest, 8% is closed deciduous broadleaf forest, 13% are closed forest of unknown type, and 5% is wetland. The Amur River delta provides extensive wetlands and associated plant life.

== Fauna ==
Among mammals, common predators are red fox, wolverines, wolves and lynx. Also common are forest mammals such as brown bear, and ungulates such as moose, sika deer, and caribou. The Shantar Islands and the Sea of Okhotsk are host to large colonies of seabirds. Common land birds include northern goshawk, Ural owl, Oriental cuckoo, and Eurasian treecreeper.

== Protections ==
Over 8% of the ecoregion is covered by an officially protected area of the Russian Federation, including:

- Botcha Nature Reserve. The northernmost reserve inhabited by the endangered Amur tiger. (Area: 2,674 km2)
- Bureya Nature Reserve An IUCN class Ia "strict ecological reserve" (a Zapovednik). (Area: 3,584 km2)
- Dzhugdzur Nature Reserve. Supports spawning streams into the Okhotsk Sea for chum, pink salmon and coho salmon. (Area: 8,599 km2)
- Komsomolsk Nature Reserve An IUCN class Ia "strict ecological reserve" (a Zapovednik). (Area: 643 km2)
- Shantar Islands National Park An IUCN class II "national park". (Area: 5,155 km2)

== Threats ==
Commercial gas extraction in the area of Sakhalin Island has brought more industrial activity, including pipelines going through the forests. As with most of the maritime Far East, pressure from commercial logging affects the forests.

== Urban areas and settlements ==
The area is sparsely populated; the largest city is Komsomolsk on the Amur River at the southern edge of the region. The region is in the Palearctic realm (Euro-Siberian region). It covers 155,260 km^{2} (59,950 sq mi).
