= Anyuysky National Park =

National park in Khabarovsk Krai, Russia

- Анюйский (Russian)
- IUCN category II (national park)
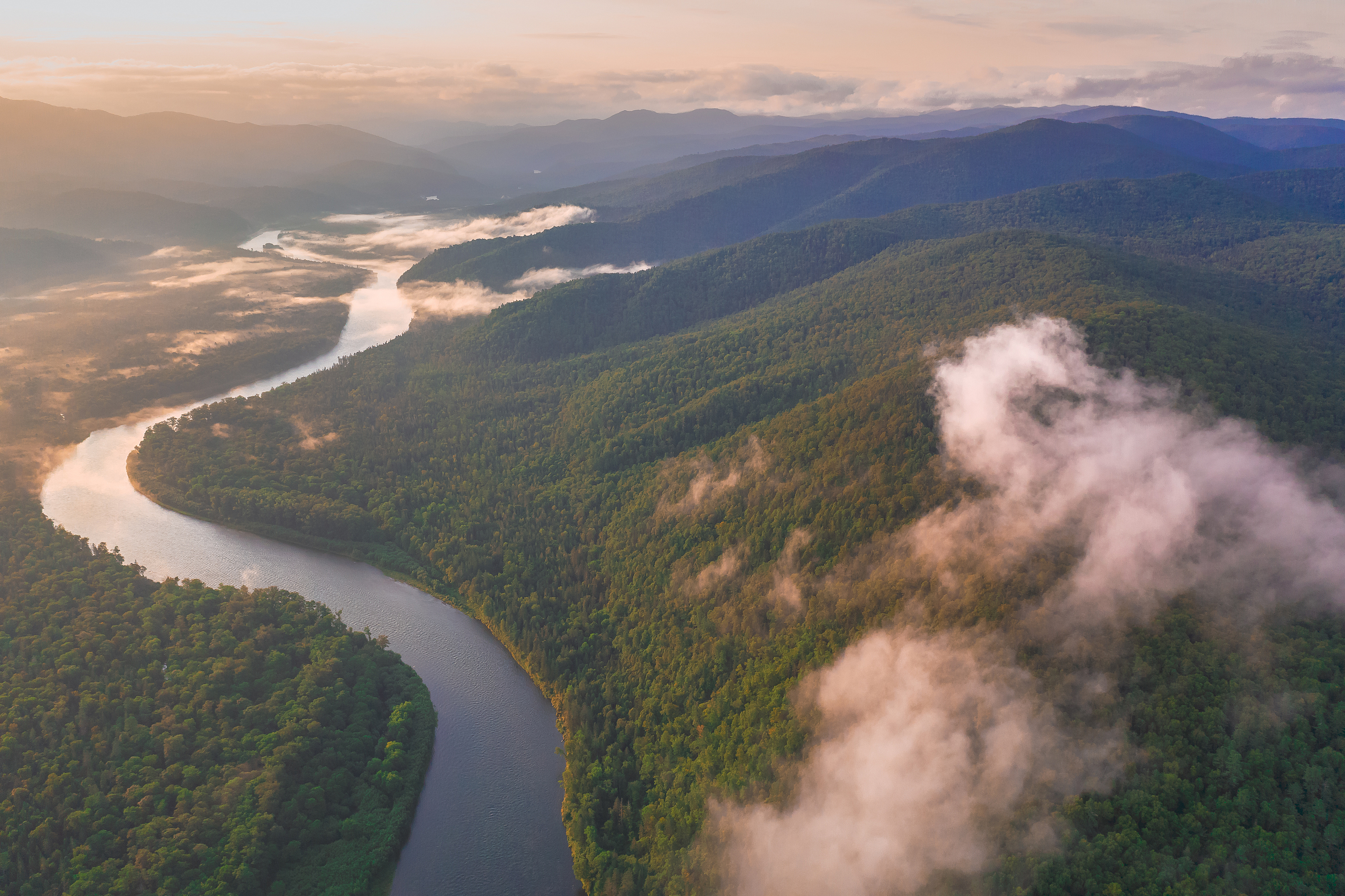

- Location within Russia
- Location: Khabarovsk Krai
- Nearest city: Khabarovsk
- Coordinates: 49°26′26″N 136°33′25″E
- Area: 429,370 hectares (1,060,996 acres; 4,294 km^{2}; 1,658 sq mi)
- Established: May 15, 1999
- Governing body: FGBI "Anyuiskiy"
- Website: http://anyui-park-rf.ru/

Anyuysky National Park (Russian: Анюйский национальный парк) covers the basin of the Anyuy River, on the west slope of the Central Sikhote-Alin Mountain range in the Russian Far East. The Anyuy flows west into the Amur River, the main river of the region, as it flows northeast into the Sea of Okhotsk. The park is important because it creates an ecological corridor from the low floodplain of the Amur, to the high forested mountains of the Sikhote-Alin. The park is in the Nanaysky District in Khabarovsk Krai, about 50 miles downstream (i.e., northeast) of the city of Khabarovsk. The area is remote, with few towns and sparse population. The area has historically depended on salmon fishing, logging, and hunting. The local indigenous people are the Nanai people, representing about a quarter of the nearby settlements.

== Topography ==
The park's boundaries form a horseshoe-shape that follows the dividing ridges of the small river basins of the Anyuy and Pihtsy rivers, which flow west into the Amur River. The eastern portion of the territory is mountainous, while the lower western portion is mostly floodplain. Approximately 45% of the park tree cover is Far Eastern Taiga, 30% is sub-taiga (mid-mountain coniferous forest), 14% is river floodplain and delta, and 11% is marsh. With one-quarter of its territory being temperate wetland of the Amur-Heilong River Basin, Anyuysky is an important habitat for wetland species and fish in the mountain streams above the Amur. The southern boundary follows the northern line of the "Three Sisters" dividing range of mountains.

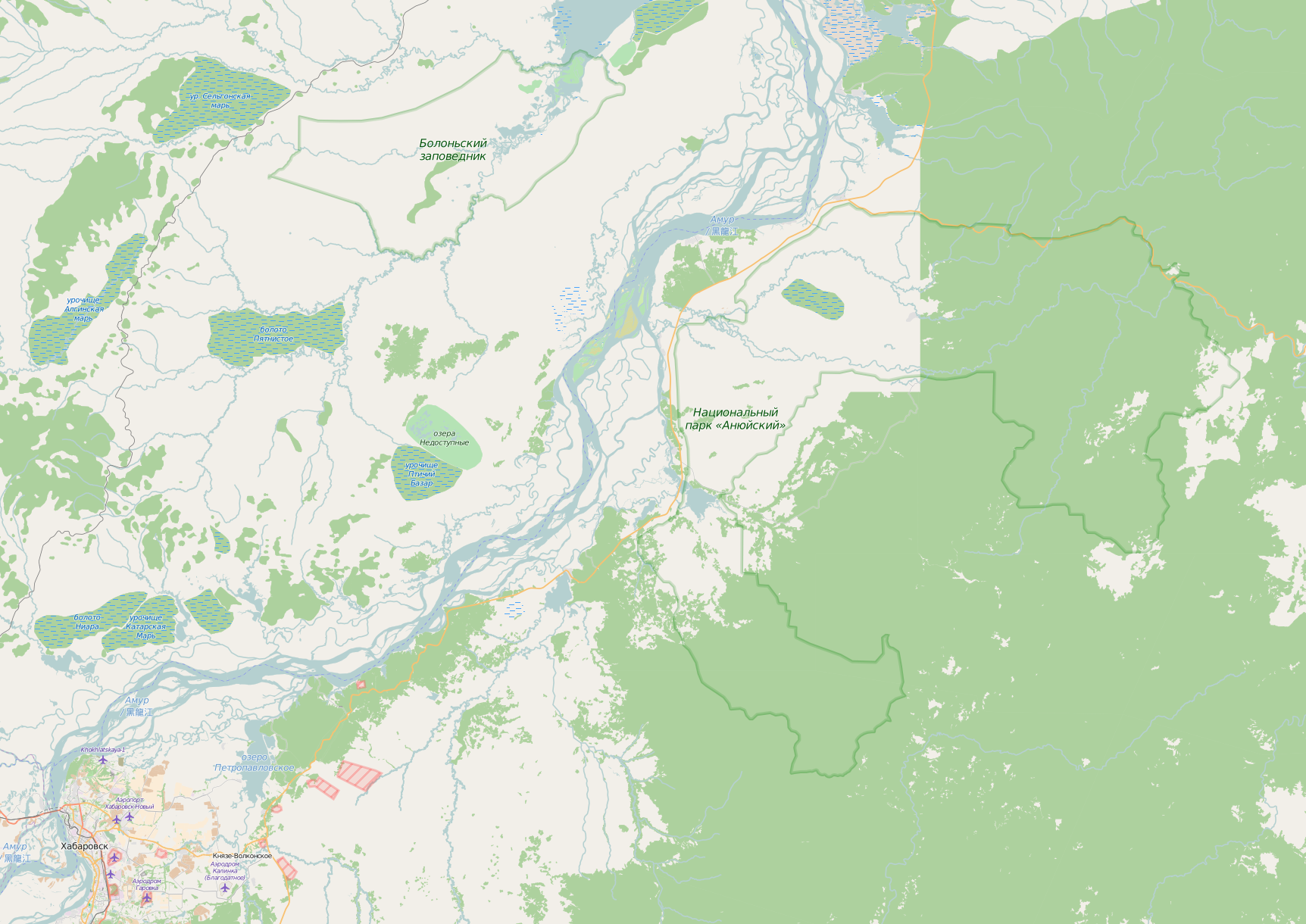
Boundaries of Anyuysky National Park (center-right). Note the inverted horseshoe shape, with the top near the town of Troitskoye, Khabarovsk Krai on the Amur River, which flows towards the northeast. The park stretches into the Sihkote-Alin Mountains to the east. The city of Khabarovsk is at the lower left.

The western half of the park is on a low-lying eastern extension of the "Sredneamurskaya plain". This plain is a flat, boggy depression between the Sikhote-Aline ridge to the east and the Lesser Khingan mountains to the west. These are the alluvial lowlands of the Amur River floodplain, down to 40 meters in altitude. The southeastern wing of the park is the valley of the Pihtsy river, and is relatively flat. The northeastern wing is the valley of the Anyuy River and its tributaries, and it has steeper and deeper canyons, and an average altitude of 600 meters. The ultimate headwaters of the Anyuy is Tordoki Yani, the highest peak in the Sikhote-Alin.

== Climate and ecoregion ==
Anyuysky has a Humid continental, warm summer subtype climate (Köppen climate classification Dwb), with four distinct seasons, cold dry winters (precipitation less than a tenth of the summer's rain), and warm wet summers. Such ecoregions are known for temperate forests with fall foliage.

Nanaysky District

Climate chart (precipitation, max. and min. temperature)
J	F	M	A	M	J	J	A	S	O	N	D
0.5 1 −16	0.4 10 −9	0.7 26 7	1.4 46 27	2.3 61 40	3.3 71 51	5 77 59	5.2 75 58	3.5 65 47	1.8 49 31	1 24 9	0.7 5 −10
- █ Average max. and min. temperatures in °F
- █ Precipitation totals in inches
Metric conversion
J	F	M	A	M	J	J	A	S	O	N	D
13 −18 −27	10 −12 −23	18 −3 −14	36 8 −3	58 16 4	84 22 10	127 25 15	132 24 14	89 18 8	46 9 0	25 −4 −13	18 −15 −23
- █ Average max. and min. temperatures in °C
- █ Precipitation totals in mm

Anyuysky is in the Ussuri broadleaf and mixed forests ecoregion. According to the World Wildlife Federation (WWF), "compared to other temperate ecosystems, the level of endemism in plants and invertebrates in the region is extraordinarily high". This high level of biodiversity is attributed to the number of ecological regions that meet in the region, the isolated nature of the Russian portion of the Amur River Basic (compared with the more developed Chinese and Korean counterparts), and the lack of glaciation in the most recent ice age.

The freshwater ecoregion for Anyuysky is "Lower Amur River Basin" (Number 528). The Amur river supports more freshwater species than any other river in Russia (120 species), and is known for the salmon that migrate up the Amur and its tributary mountain streams.

== Plants ==
The park is a critical component of the network of protected areas in the middle and lower Amur, particularly because it integrates a continuous habitat from river floodplains, through valley-mountain sub-taiga of Mongolian oak and Korean pine, to mountain ridges. The massive Korean cedar pine has been described as the "heart of the ecosystem" by the World Wildlife Fund. The Korean pine's numbers have been reduced by two-thirds in the past 50 years, and are becoming increasingly a target of illegal logging in the area surrounding Anyuysky.

== Animals ==
The endangered Amur tiger is a resident species of the park, as are most of the mountain species of the northern Sikhote-Alin. The lower floodplains are important for their support for migratory birds. Vulnerable species in the park include the near-threatened mountain weasel, the vulnerable Asian black bear, and the "data deficient" (IUCN definition) long-tailed birch mouse.

== History and current status ==
The Nanai were the traditional inhabitants of the local, rural settlements. On the interior border of the park, the small village of Arsenyevo was a place of exile during the 1930s collectivization; it also served as a Japanese POW camp in the 1940s.

In 2011, the Sakhalin–Khabarovsk–Vladivostok pipeline was completed, using a section of an earlier pipeline along the Amur River above Khabarovsk. The pipeline runs along the west border of Anyuysky park. The operator, Gazprom, states that "A stringent requirement – the minimal environmental impact – was observed during the pipeline facilities construction. The construction operations were carried out within the existing communication lines. The lands disturbed during the construction were remediated."

As of 2012, the park reported the opening of a visitors center, and that 50 people were employed by the park.

In 2015, an Amur tiger named "Uporny" (Russian for "Stubborn") was released in the region, and after wandering for six weeks was recorded by GPS as having chosen a territory inside Anyuysky National Park. The director of the Amur Tiger Center noted that "We are encouraged with Uporny's behavior so far. He stays away from people in very remote areas, and even avoids any human-made infrastructure. Over the entire period since his release he never uses the roads or even abandoned logging tracks."

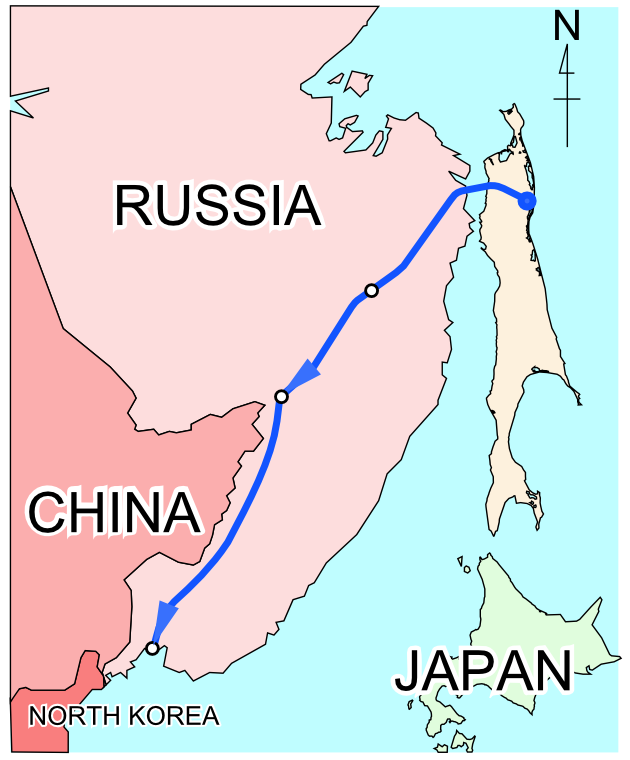
The Sakhalin–Khabarovsk–Vladivostok pipeline runs along the Amur River, on the western border of Anyuysky National Park

== See also ==
- Protected areas of Russia
