= Bolon Nature Reserve =

Nature reserve in Khabarovsk Krai, Russia

- Russian: Болоньский заповедник (Also: Bolon'sky)
- IUCN category Ia (strict nature reserve)
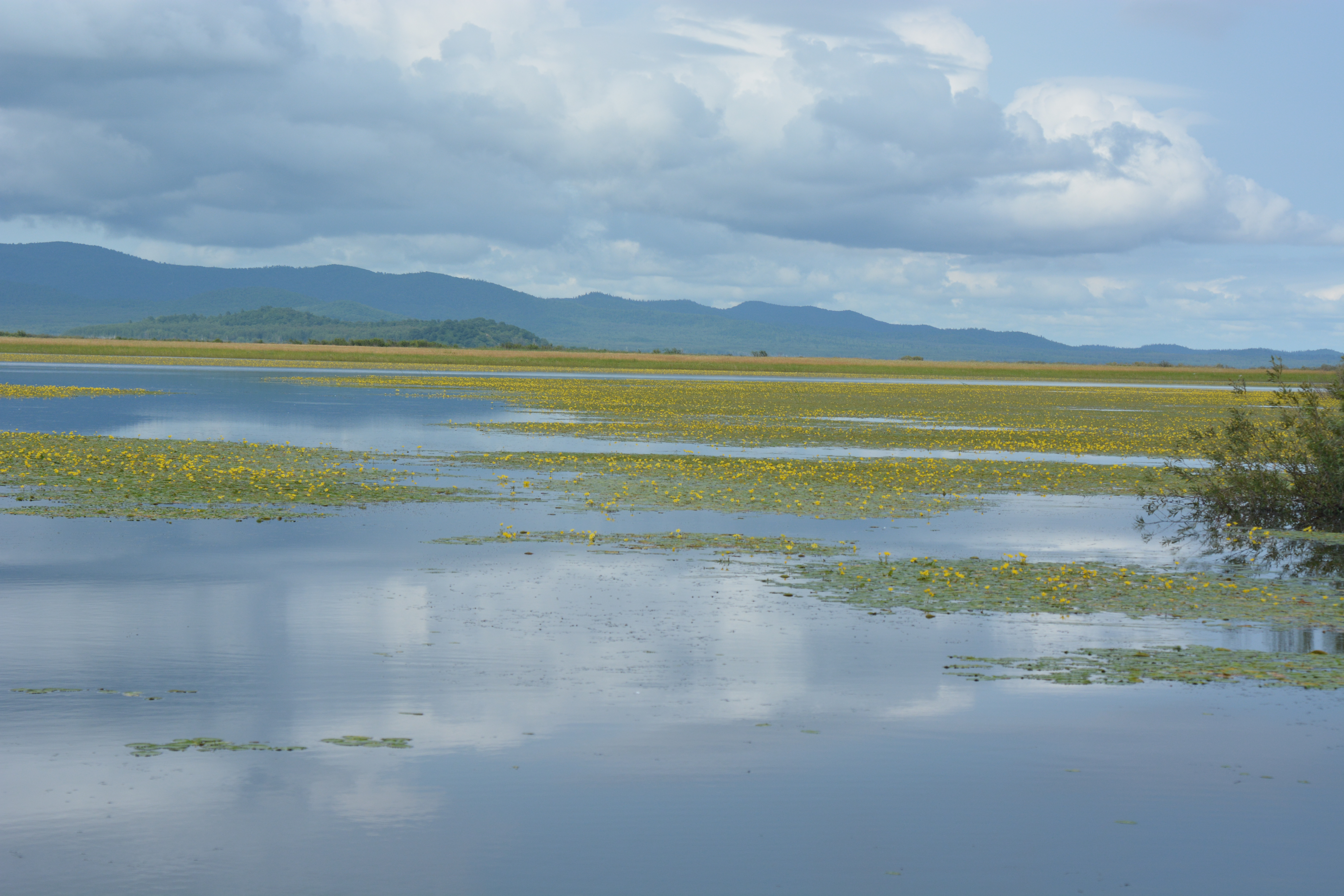
- Wetlands of Lake Bolon

- Location within Russia
- Location: Khabarovsk Krai
- Nearest city: Khabarovsk
- Coordinates: 49°34′7″N 135°54′49″E
- Area: 100,000 hectares (247,105 acres; 386 sq mi)
- Established: 1997
- Governing body: Ministry of Natural Resources and Environment (Russia)
- Website: http://www.zapovedamur.ru/

Ramsar Wetland
- Official name: Lake Bolon and the mouths of the Selgon and Simmi Rivers
- Designated: 13 September 1994
- Reference no.: 686

Bolon Nature Reserve (Russian: Болоньский заповедник) (also Bolon'sky) is the oldest Russian 'zapovednik' (strict ecological reserve) in the Russian Far East. It is located on the Middle Amur River lowlands adjacent to the south-west of Lake Bolon. The reserve covers the wetlands of international importance. Large numbers of migratory waterfowl use the area for nesting and stopovers on long flights. The reserve is situated halfway between the city of Khabarovsk and Komsomolsk-on-Amur, in the Amursky District of Khabarovsk Krai. The reserve was created in 1997, and covers an area of 100,000 ha (390 sq mi).

== Topography ==
The Bolon Reserve covers 100,000 hectares south of Lake Bolon, a terrain of meandering streams of the estuaries of the Selgon River and Simmy River flowing into the lake. The reserve covers a portion of the southern lake shore. The Amur River runs southwest to northeast about 50 km from the reserve. Anyuysky National Park is across the Amur from the Bolon Reserve.

== Climate and ecoregion ==
Bolon is located in the Ussuri broadleaf and mixed forests ecoregion. This ecoregion os of the Ussuri River region in the middle Amur River basin on the west slope of the Sikhote-Alin Mountains. The Ussuri ecoregion is characterized by mixed broadleaf species such as Manchurian ash and Japanese elm in the lowlands, and Korean pine and broadleaf forests in the middle elevations.

The climate of Bolon is Humid continental climate, cool summer (Köppen climate classification (Dwb) ). This climate is characterized by high variation in temperature, both daily and seasonally; with dry winters and cool summers.

== Flora and fauna ==
Swamps occupy 80% of the territory. The plant life of the reserve is accordingly aquatic and wetland-associated. On the lower terraces are reed-sedge and herb-sedge. Meadows are reed grass and reed grass-forb. Scientists on the reserve have recorded 348 species of vascular plants in 92 families.

Around Lake Bolon on the plain are the summer feeding grounds for elk and deer; they migrate from the nearby mountain ridges for calving and rearing. Typical other mammals are the brown bear, badger, and raccoon dog.

Spring and autumn migrations bring an estimated 1.2 million to the reserve. Over 200 species have been recorded, including the Far Eastern stork, Steller's sea eagle, and snipe-spoon-billed sandpiper. The reserve also hosts the Japanese crane at the northern edge of its range.

== Ecoeducation and access ==
As a strict nature reserve, the Bolon Reserve is mostly closed to the general public, although scientists and those with 'environmental education' purposes can make arrangements with park management for visits. It is possible for the public to arrange for guided tours on the eco-route "Avian Crossroads" during the migration periods - April 20 to May 15 in the spring, and September 15 to October 20 in the fall. Applications must be made in advance with payment of fees; the route can be arranged for visit on foot or small boat. The excursion takes 6-8 hours, and there is a bird observation deck on the lake. The reserve's office is in the village of Dzhuen. Recently, the reserve has opened an ethnographic museum dedicated to the Nanai people in the village.

== See also ==
- List of Russian Nature Reserves (class 1a 'zapovedniks')
- National parks of Russia
- Protected areas of Russia
