= Anyuy (Amur) =

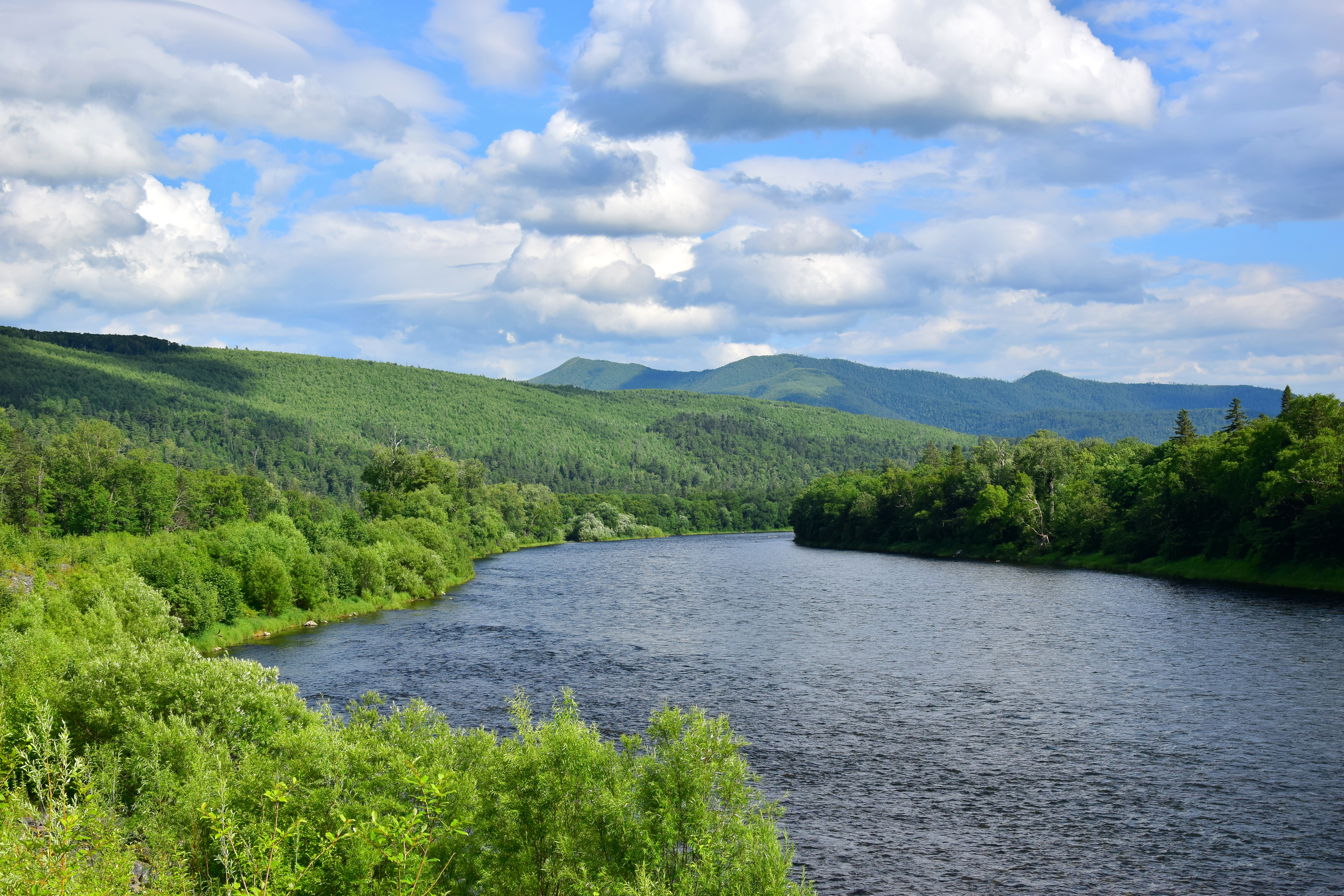

- Location of mouth

Location
- Country: Russia

Physical characteristics
- Source: Tordoki Yani
  - location: Nanaysky District
  - coordinates: 48°14′53″N 137°41′49″E
  - elevation: 1,367 m (4,485 ft)
- Mouth: Amur
  - location: Naikhin, Khabarovsk Krai
  - coordinates: 49°17′59″N 136°26′47″E
  - elevation: 17 m (56 ft)
- Length: 393 km (244 mi)
- Basin size: 12,700 km^{2} (4,900 sq mi)

Basin features
- Progression: Amur→ Sea of Okhotsk

The Anyuy (Russian: река Аню́й), also known as Onyuy (Онюй) or Dondon (Дондон) is a river in the Khabarovsk Krai in Russia. It is a right tributary of the Amur. It originates on slope of Tordoki Yani in the Sikhote-Alin mountain range, and falls into the Amur between Khabarovsk and Komsomolsk-on-Amur.

The length of the Anyuy is 393 kilometres (244 mi). The area of its basin is 12,700 square kilometres (4,900 mi^{2}). The Manoma is a main tributary of the Anyuy.

== History ==
According to French Jesuit geographers travelling on the Ussuri and the Amur in 1709, the Dondon River (Tondon, in contemporary accounts) formed the border between the lands populated by the people known as Yupi Tartars (which is the traditional Chinese name for the Nanai people and related groups), living on the Ussury and the Amur south of the Dondon, and the people whose name was transcribed into French as Ke tcheng, living on the Amur from the mouth of the Dondon downstream. The latter name may be a transcription of the reported self-name of the Nanais of the lower Amur, Hezhe nai or Hezheni which is also the modern Chinese name for the Nanais, Hezhe or Hezhen.

In 1999, a significant portion of the Anyuy basin was incorporated into the creation of Anyuysky National Park, one of the major protected areas of the Russian Federation.

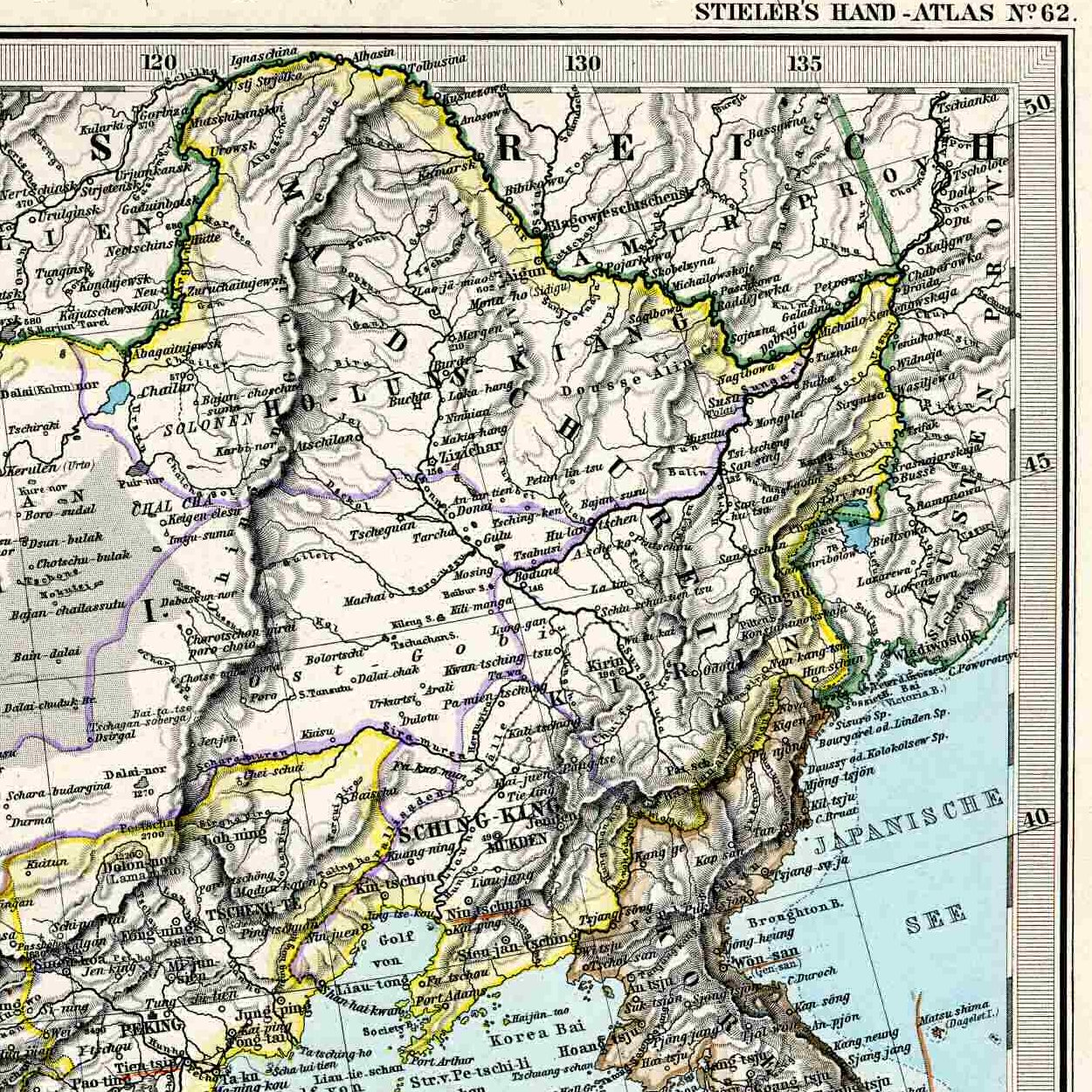
The Dondon on an 1891 map

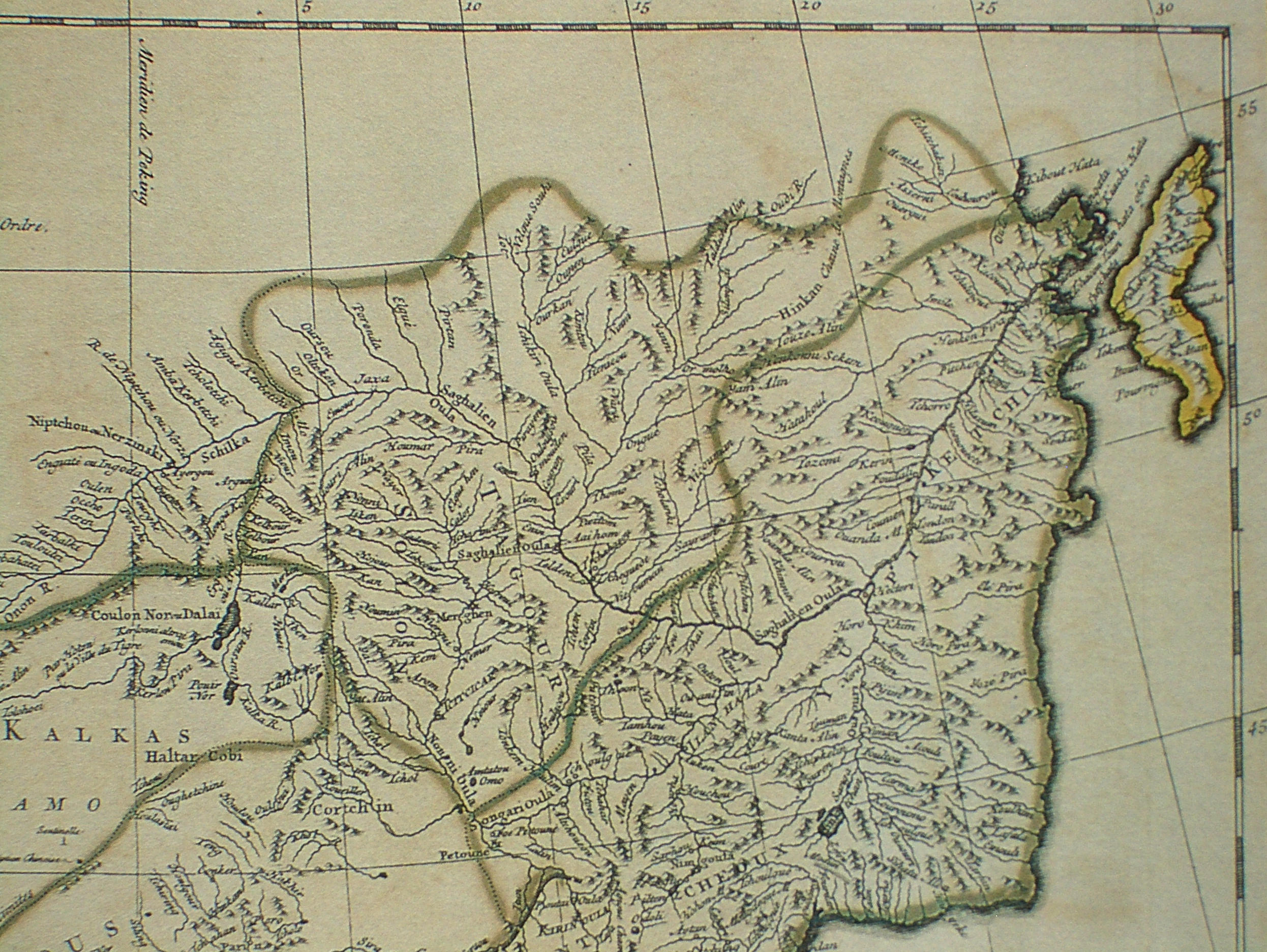
The Tondon River, separating the lands of the Yupi and Ketching people on a 1734 French map
