= Gorin (river) =

River of Khabarovsk Krai

Gorin Горин
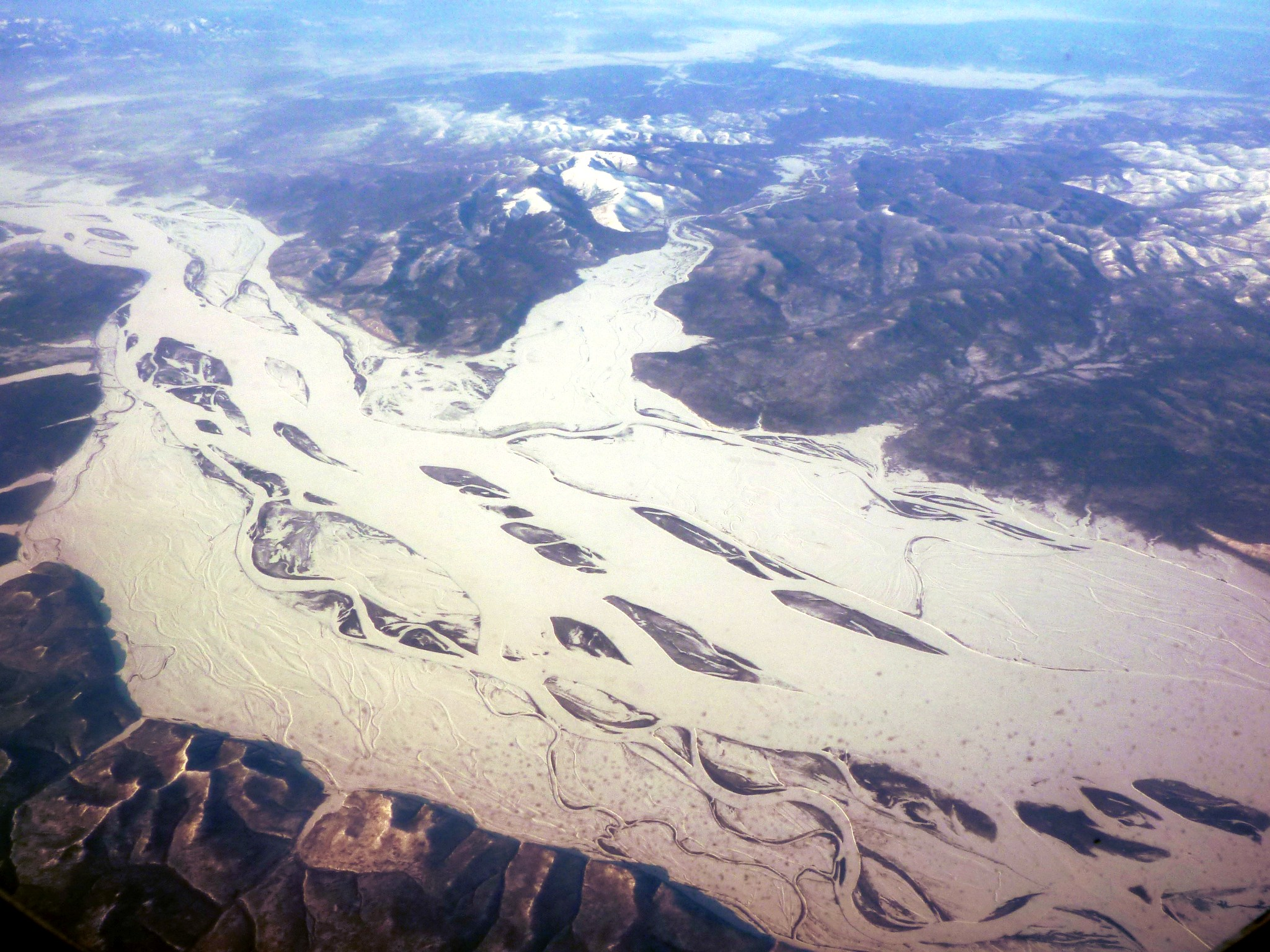
- Confluence of the Gorin and the Amur

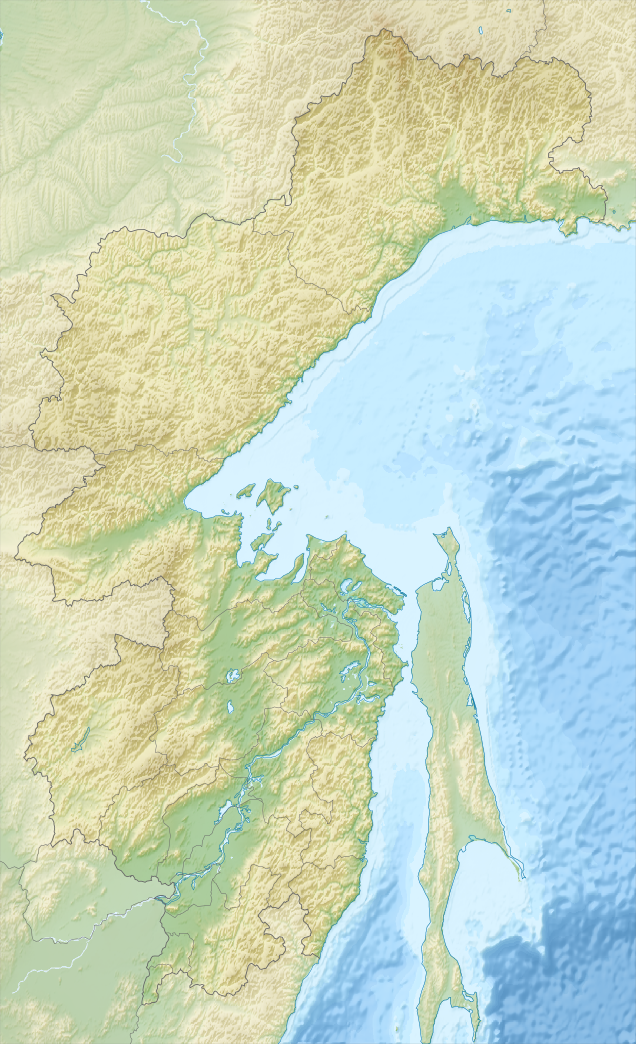
- Mouth location in Khabarovsk Krai, Russia

Location
- Country: Russia

Physical characteristics
- Source
  - location: Dayana Range; Badzhal Range
  - coordinates: 50°26′40″N 135°04′19″E
  - elevation: 960 m (3,150 ft)
- Mouth: Amur
  - coordinates: 50°46′14″N 137°49′55″E
- Length: 390 km (240 mi)
- Basin size: 22,400 km^{2} (8,600 sq mi)
- Discharge
  - average: 150 m^{3}/s (5,300 cu ft/s)

Basin features
- Progression: Amur→ Sea of Okhotsk

The Gorin (Russian: Горин), also known as "Goryun" and "Garin", is a river in Khabarovsk Krai, Russia. It is the 8th longest tributary of the Amur, with a length of 390 kilometres (240 mi) and a drainage basin area of 22,400 square kilometres (8,600 mi^{2}).

It flows across the Solnechny and Komsomolsky districts. Over 80% of the river basin is covered by forests. The Komsomolsk Nature Reserve, a protected area, is in its lower course, in the area of its confluence with the Amur.

== Course ==
The Gorin is a left tributary of the Amur. It has its sources in the northwestern slope of the Dayana Range, part of the Badzhal mountain system, about 100 kilometres (62 mi) to the west of Komsomolsk-on-Amur. In its upper course the river flows roughly in an ENE direction within a narrow valley and towards its middle reaches the valley expands to a width between 2 kilometres (1.2 mi) and 3 kilometres (1.9 mi). The lower course is very swampy and the river forms wide meanders. Finally it meets the Amur 546 kilometres (339 mi) from its mouth.

The main tributaries of the Gorin are the 96 kilometres (60 mi) long Khurmuli on the right, and the 69 kilometres (43 mi) long Big Elga, the 69 kilometres (43 mi) long Khagdu, the 221 kilometres (137 mi) long Kharpi, and the 135 kilometres (84 mi) long Boktor (Volchor) on the left. There are 879 lakes in the river basin, the largest of which is Evoron, with an area of 194 square kilometres. The river freezes over between mid-November and the end of April or the beginning of May.

Basin of the Amur

== Fauna ==
The river is an important spawning ground for Pacific salmon, chum salmon and pink salmon. Lenok and grayling are also abundant in its waters.

== See also ==
- List of rivers of Russia
