= Manoma =

Location
- Country: Russia

Physical characteristics
- Source
  - location: Sikhote-Alin
- Mouth: Anyuy
  - coordinates: 49°19′27″N 136°36′40″E
- Length: 198 km (123 mi)
- Basin size: 2,450 km^{2} (950 sq mi)

Basin features
- Progression: Anyuy→ Amur→ Sea of Okhotsk

The Manoma is a river in Khabarovsk Krai, Russia. It is the main, right tributary of the Anyuy. It flows between Khabarovsk and Komsomolsk-on-Amur. It is 198 kilometres (123 mi) long, and has a drainage basin of 2,450 square kilometres (950 sq mi). It originates on the slopes of Sikhote-Alin mountain range. In its upper reaches it is a typical mountain river, downstream it flows through flat fields.
