= Evoron =

Freshwater lake in Khabarovsk Krai, Russia

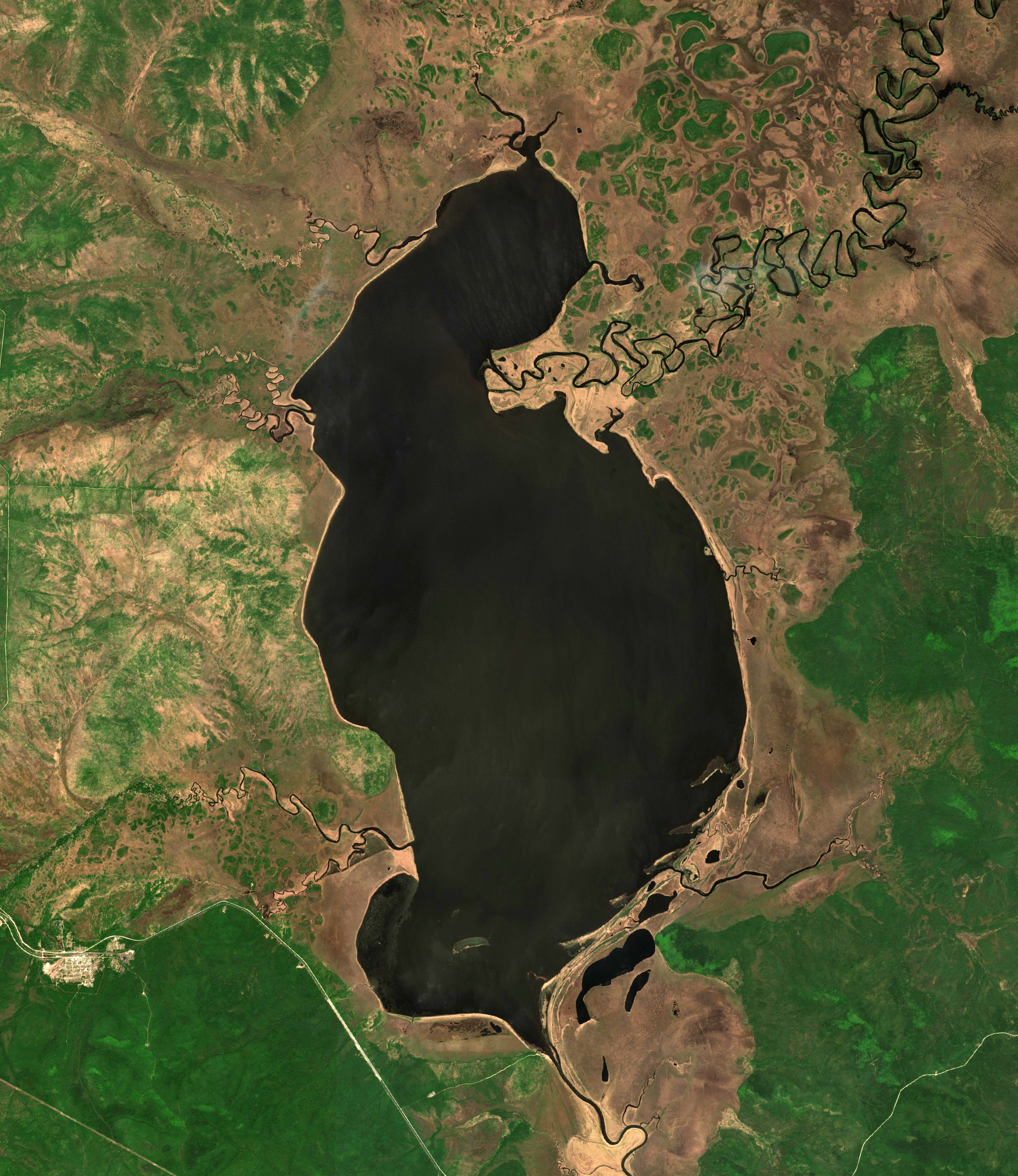
- Sentinel-2 image (2017)

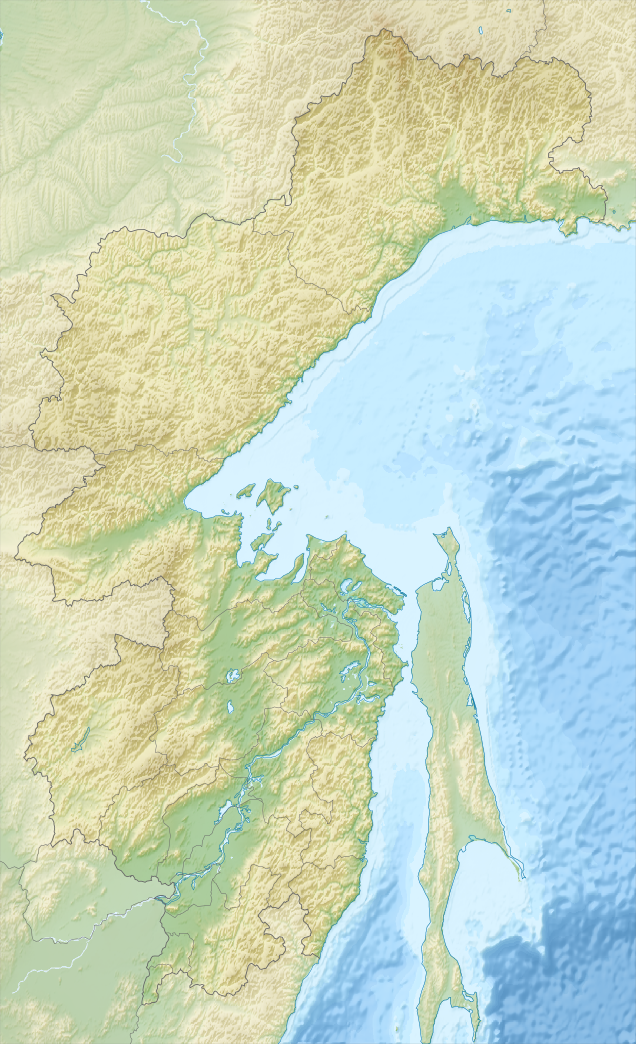
- Location within Russia Location within Khabarovsk Krai
- Location: Khabarovsk Krai
- Coordinates: 51.45°N 136.4166667°E
- Primary inflows: Evur, Shiroki
- Primary outflows: Devyatke
- Catchment area: 5,670 km^{2} (2,190 sq mi)
- Basin countries: Russia
- Max. length: 30 km (19 mi)
- Max. width: 12 km (7.5 mi)
- Surface area: 194 km^{2} (75 sq mi)
- Average depth: 2–3 m (6 ft 7 in – 9 ft 10 in)

Evoron (Russian: Эвopон) is a large freshwater lake in Khabarovsk Krai, Russia. It is located in the Gorin River basin, part of the Amur basin.

It has an area of 194 square kilometres, and is 30 km long and 12 km at its widest. Its average depth is about 2–3 m. The lake is used for fishing. The Evur and Shroki rivers flow into the lake. The outflow is the Devyatke River, a tributary of the Gorin.

== See also ==
- List of lakes of Russia
