= Komsomolsk Nature Reserve =

Strict nature reserve in Khabarovsk Krai, Russia

- Russian: Комсомольский заповедник (Also: Komsomolsky)
- IUCN category Ia (strict nature reserve)
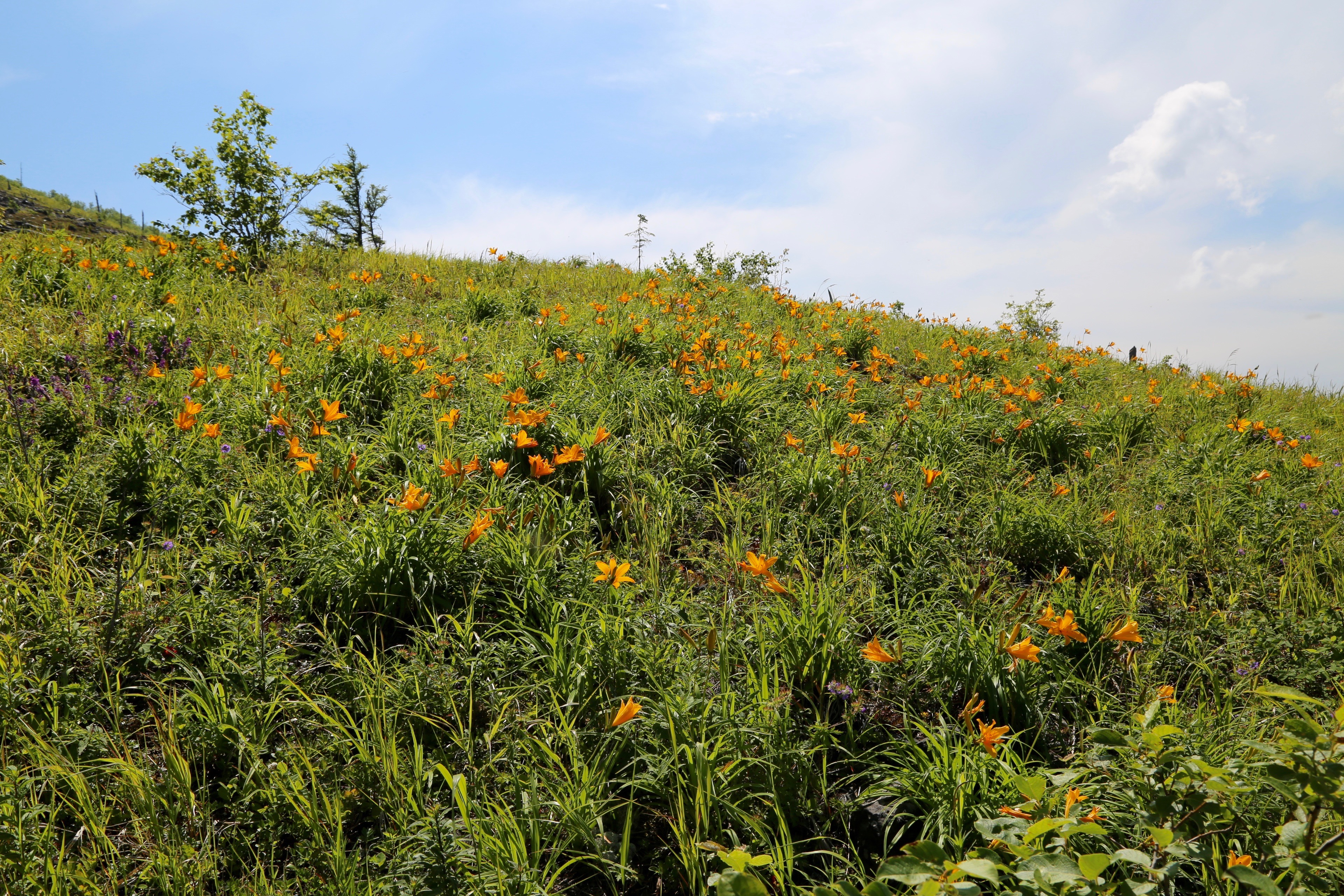
- Hemerocallidoideae flowers in Komsomolsk Nature Reserve

- Location within Russia
- Location: Khabarovsk Krai
- Nearest city: Komsomolsk-on-Amur
- Coordinates: 50°48′36″N 137°43′9″E
- Area: 64,278 hectares (158,834 acres; 248 sq mi)
- Established: 1963
- Governing body: Ministry of Natural Resources and Environment (Russia)

Komsomolsk Nature Reserve (Russian: Комсомольский заповедник) (also Komsomolsky) is a Russian 'zapovednik' (strict ecological reserve), encompassing the confluence of the Gorin River and the Amur River in the Russian Far East. The reserve protects a meeting zone of multiple ecoregions in the lower Amur, including the northernmost reach of Manchurian taiga. It is located about 50 km downstream (east) of Komsomolsk-on-Amur, in the Komsomolsky District of Khabarovsk Krai. The reserve was created in 1963, and covers an area of 64,278 ha (248.18 sq mi).

== Topography ==
The Komsomolsk Reserve is located at a narrow passage of the Amur River where it passes through the Sikhote-Alin mountains to the east, and the Lower Amur mountains to the west. Upstream are the floodplains of the lower Amur River valley, and downstream is the Amur delta leading into the Sea of Okhotsk. The territory covers the delta of the Gorin River, which is a left tributary of the Amur, entering from the west. The Gorin River bisects the reserve down the middle, running roughly southeasterly. The river is 1.5–2 km wide at the northern edge of the reserve, 4–5 km wide at the mouth where it enters the Amur. The confluence features extensive terraced floodplains and river islands. The reserve is approximately rectangular, measuring 20 km north–south, and 30 km west–east. The highest point in the territory is Mt. Chokkety at 800 meters. The main ridge north of the Gorin runs parallel to the river for about 25 km with an average grade of 14 degrees.

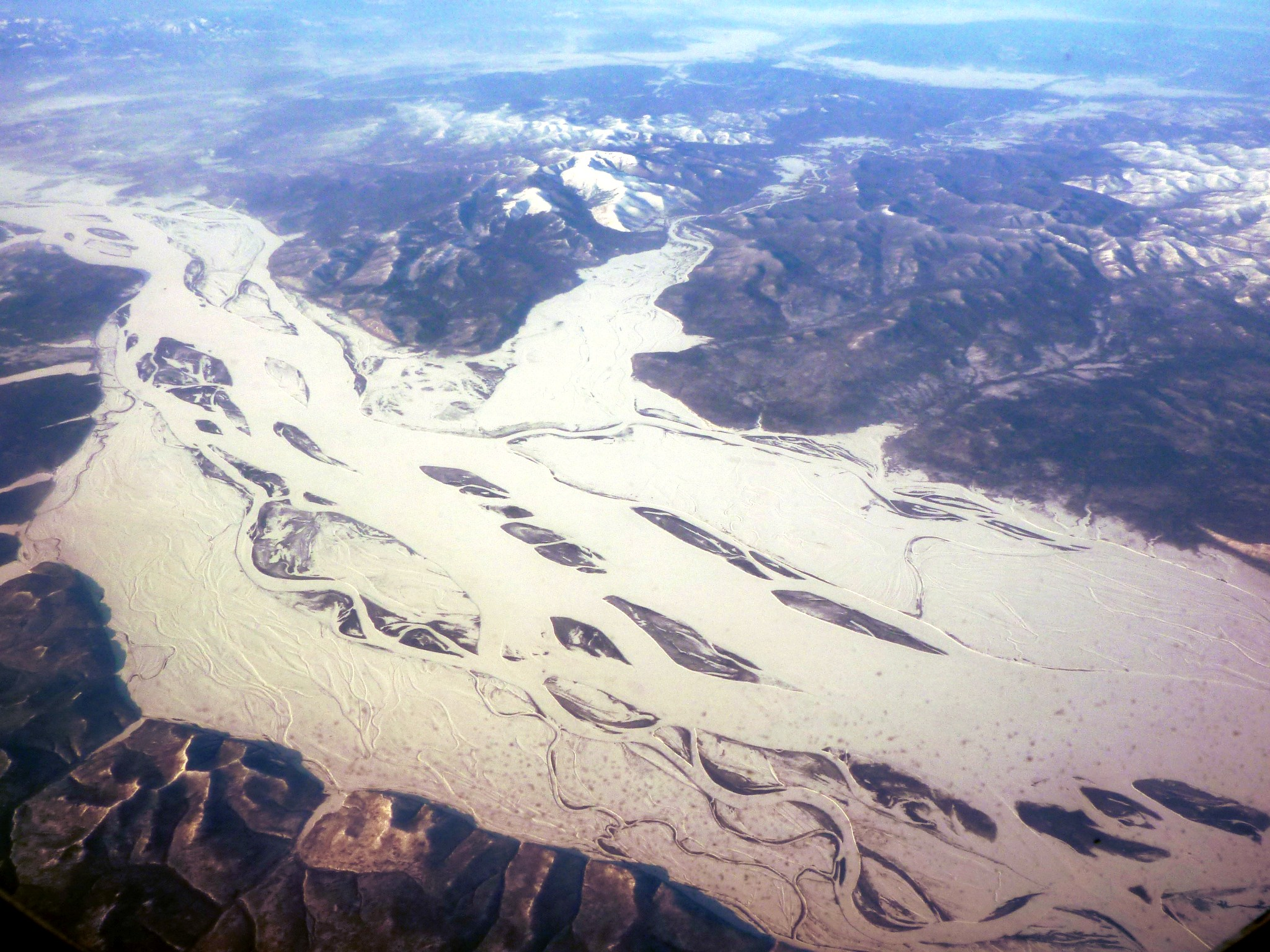
Confluence of the Gorin (top) in the Amur River (main floodplain). Komsomolsk Zapovednik

== Climate and ecoregion ==
Komsomolsk is located in the Okhotsk-Manchurian taiga ecoregion. This ecoregion is the southernmost taiga in Eurasia. At low elevations the forests are mostly light-needle taiga such as larch; at higher elevations pine and fir.

The climate of Komsomolsk is Humid continental climate, cool summer (Köppen climate classification (Dwb)). This climate is characterized by high variation in temperature, both daily and seasonally; with dry winters and cool summers. Average temperatures range from -25 C in January to +20 C in July. The wind blows from the east (sea to land) during the warm period, bringing 80-90% of the precipitation, and blows west to east (from Siberia towards the sea) during the cold season.

== Flora and fauna ==
80% of the terrain is forested. In the lower levels of the Gorin River, the forests are mostly cedar-broadleaf, while spruce and larch dominate more to the north. The vegetation communities meeting in Komsomolsky show representation of the three floristic complexes. From the south, the Manchu (Amur) complex finds more heat-loving plants left over from the pre-glaciation period. The Bering Sea complex from the northeast features Ayan spruce and fir. The East Siberian complex to the north features larch, rosemary and sedge. Fighting forest fires is a major concern of reserve management. Located on an important migratory route for birds and waterfowl, the reserve has recorded 233 species of birds. The aquatic life is also rich with 50 species of fish, 24 of which are endemic to the Amur. (The reserve includes a 100-meter strip of the Amur River).

== Ecotourism ==
As a strict nature reserve, the Komsomolsk Reserve is mostly closed to the general public, although scientists and those with 'environmental education' purposes can make arrangements with park management for visits. Visits by the public requires permission that must be obtained in advance. The main office is in the city of Komsomolsk-on-Amur.

== See also ==
- List of Russian Nature Reserves (class 1a 'zapovedniks')
- National parks of Russia
- Protected areas of Russia
