= Botcha Nature Reserve =

Nature reserve in Khabarovsk Krai, Russia

- Russian: Ботчинский заповедник (Also: Botchinsky)
- IUCN category Ia (strict nature reserve)
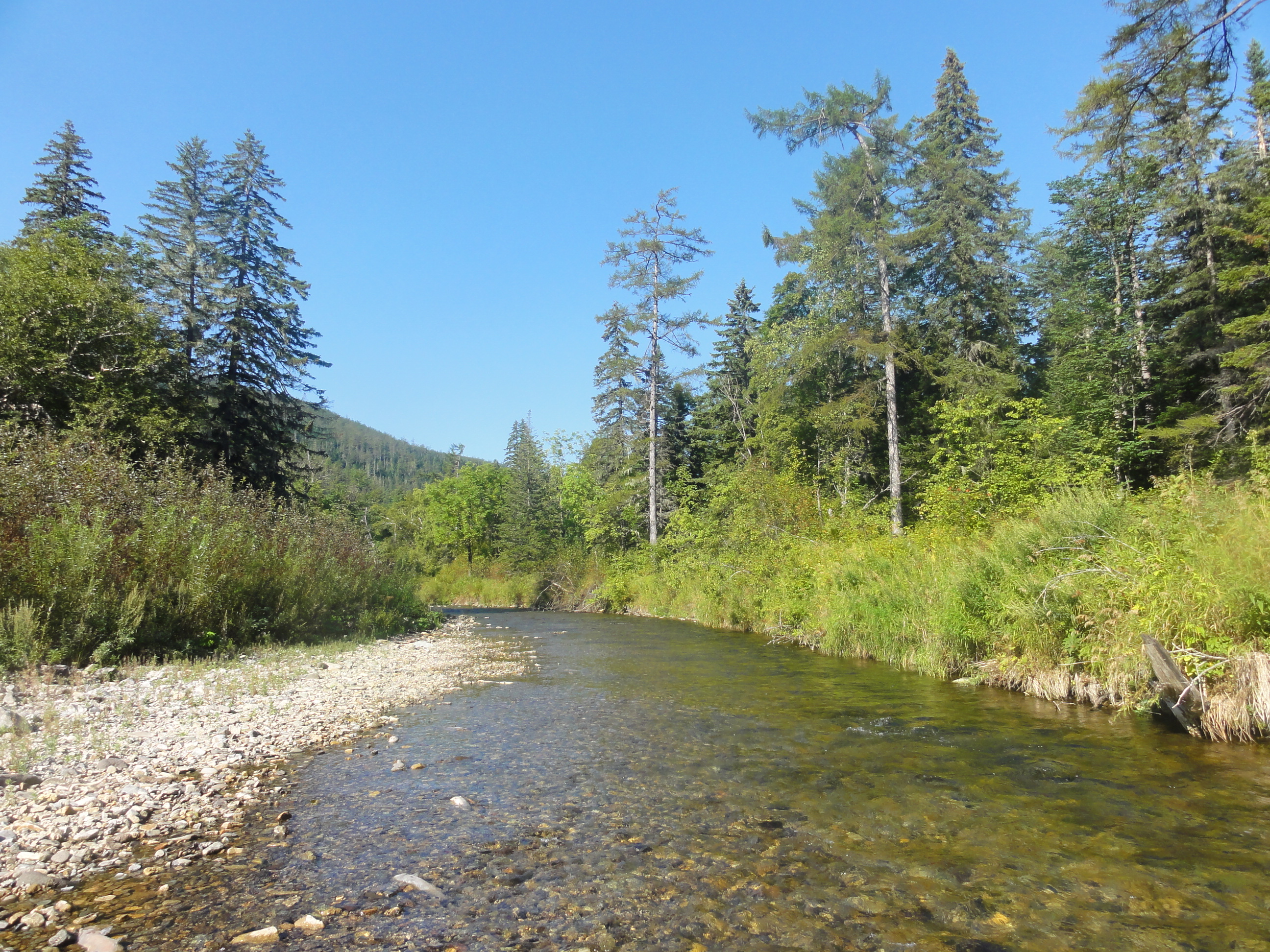
- Upper reaches of Ihka River, southern border of Botcha Reserve

- Location within Russia
- Location: Khabarovsk Krai
- Nearest city: Khabarovsk
- Coordinates: 48°8′11″N 139°13′16″E
- Area: 267,380 hectares (660,710 acres; 1,032 sq mi)
- Established: 1994
- Governing body: Ministry of Natural Resources and Environment (Russia)
- Website: http://xn----7sbeckflmcalhd0bfgii4cr9h.xn--p1ai/

Botcha Nature Reserve (Russian: Ботчинский заповедник) (also Botchinsky) is a Russian 'zapovednik' (strict ecological reserve). It is the northernmost reserve inhabited by the endangered Amur Tiger. The reserve is located in the north-eastern part of the Sikhote-Alin mountain range; it includes the Botchi River basin on its eastern slopes. The reserve is about 120 km south of the port city of Sovetskaya Gavan in the Sovetsko-Gavansky District of Khabarovsk Krai. The reserve was created in 1994, and covers an area of 267,380 ha (1,032.4 sq mi).

== Topography ==
The Botcha Reserve has a terrain of mountain ridges and spurs, encompassing the Botcha River basin. The Botcha delta for the last 10 km before its mouth, is outside of the reserve boundaries. The reserve is roughly a rectangle that parallels the east coast of Russia, running southwest to northeast, 80 km long and 50 km wide. The reserve itself is separated from the Strait of Tartary of the Sea of Japan by a coastal strip about 10 km wide. Across the strait to the east is the center of Sakhalin Island. The terrain is mountainous in the western portions of the reserve, sloping down the eastern foothills of the Central Sikhote-Alin to the Sea. The Botcha River flows to the southeast, and is a winding mountain river with a rocky bottom.

== Climate and ecoregion ==
Botcha is located in the Ussuri broadleaf and mixed forests ecoregion, which centers on the middle Amur River basin, in the Russian Far East. Mixed broadleaf species such as Manchurian ash and Japanese elm in the lowlands, Korean pine and broadleaf forests in the middle elevations, and fir and spruce up to the subalpine levels.

The climate of Botcha is a Humid continental climate, warm summer (Köppen climate classification (Dfb)). This climate is characterized by large swings in temperature, both diurnally and seasonally, with mild summers and cold, snowy winters. The Botcha Reserve is colder than the other reserves farther south in the maritime region, due to the cooling effects of the sea. Summers are short, wet and foggy, with an average temperature in July of 13.8 C degrees.

== Flora and fauna ==
The reserve is mostly wooded, with fir-spruce taiga and, where ground has been cleared by forest fires, birch-larch forests. Understory in the boggy lowlands features rhododendron and blueberries. The reserve is known as a location of fossilized Upper-Tertiary flora (that is the imprints in rock).

The animal life of the reserve is typical of the wooded eastern slopes. Characteristic mammals are elk, roebuck, musk deer, brown bear, lynx, sable, and otter. Rare species of birds noted include the Hooded crane. The Botchi River and its tributaries are important spawning grounds for pink salmon and chum salmon, and are home to trout, char, and grayling.

== Ecoeducation and access ==
As a strict nature reserve, the Botcha Reserve is mostly closed to the general public, although scientists and those with 'environmental education' purposes can make arrangements with park management for visits. There are three 'ecotourist' routes in the reserve, however, that are open to the public, but these require permits to be obtained in advance and capacity is very limited (generally two groups of ten per month). The main office is in the Grossevichi at the mouth of the Botchi, on the coast.

== See also ==
- List of Russian Nature Reserves (class 1a 'zapovedniks')
- National parks of Russia
- Protected areas of Russia
