= Ussuri broadleaf and mixed forests =

Ecoregion in the Russian Far East

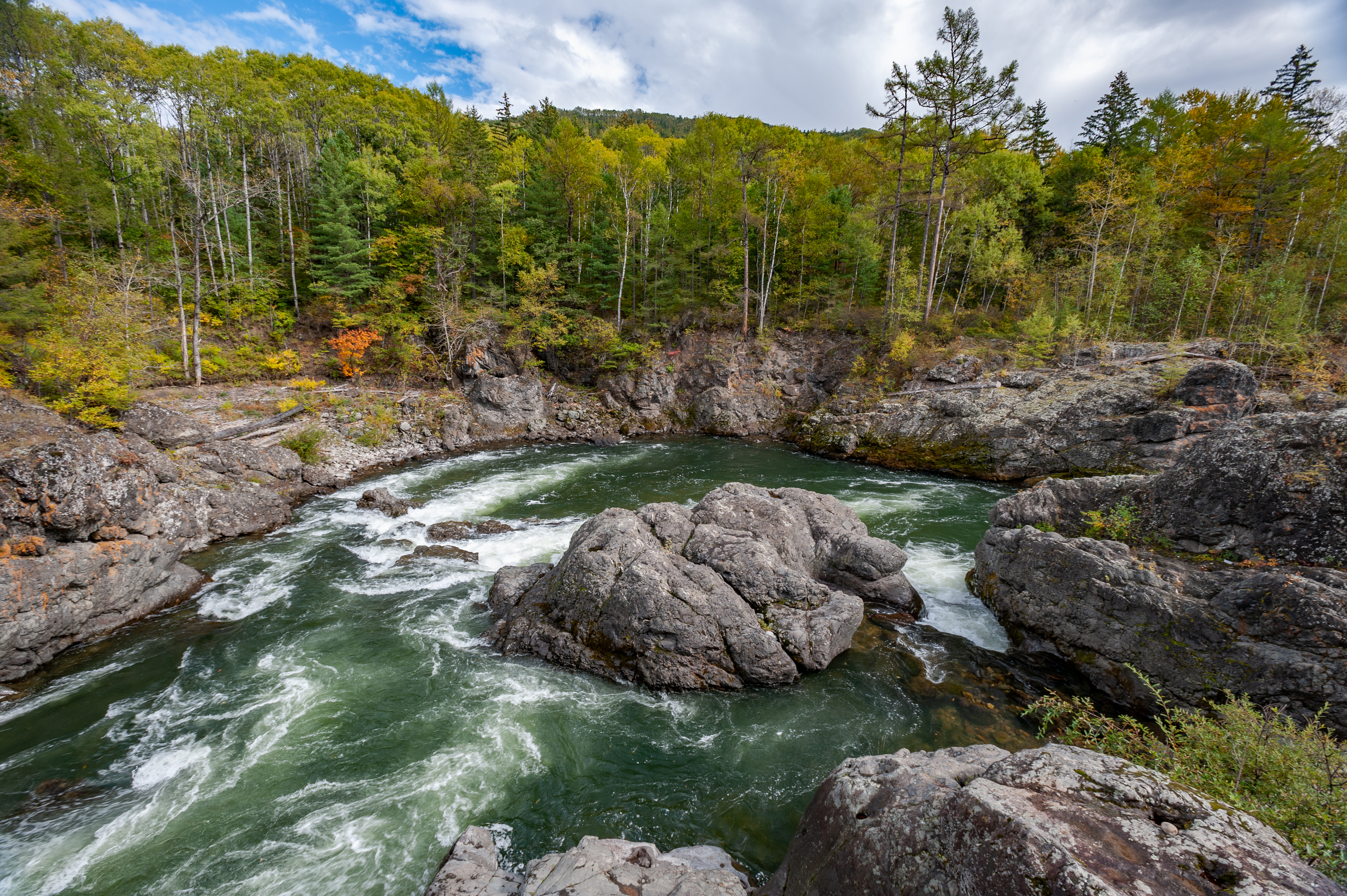

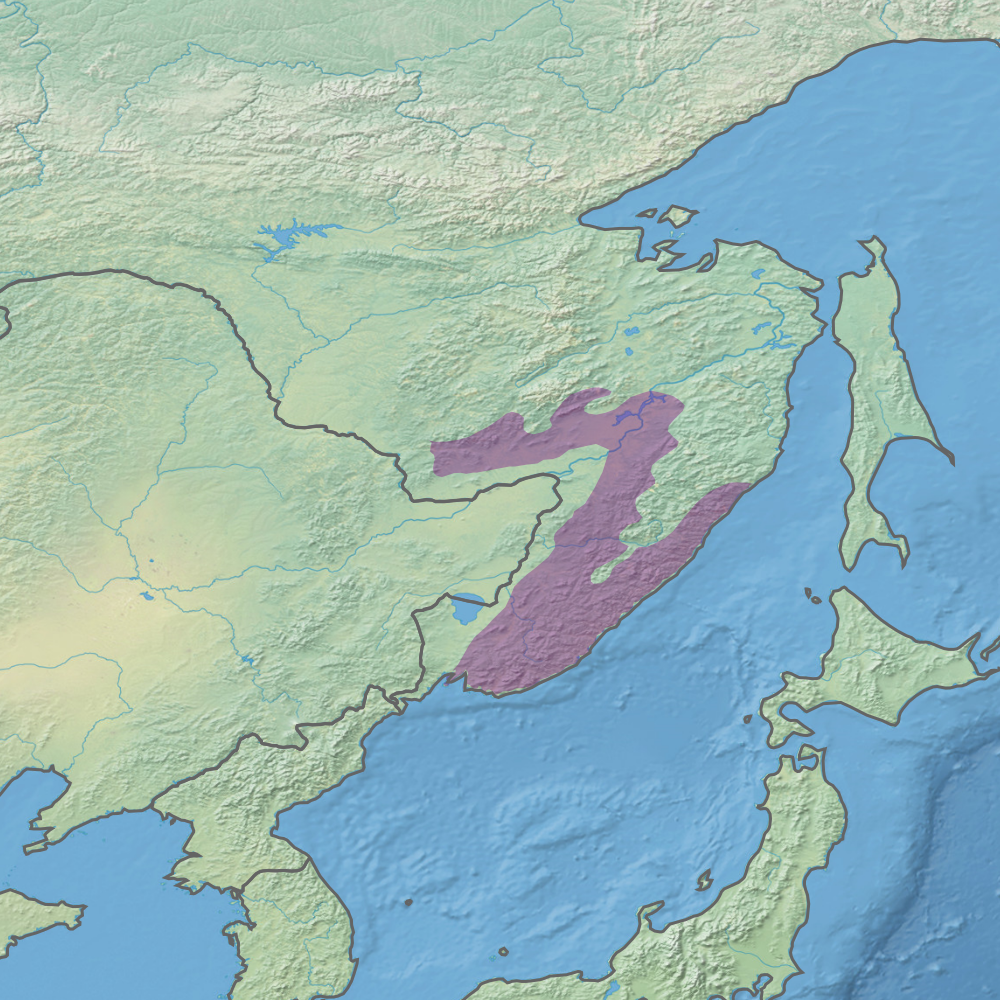
- Ecoregion territory (in purple)

Ecology
- Realm: Palearctic
- Biome: temperate broadleaf and mixed forests

Geography
- Area: 223,516 km^{2} (86,300 mi^{2})
- Countries: Russia

The Ussuri broadleaf and mixed forests ecoregion (WWF ID: PA0443) covers a mountainous areas above the lower Amur River and Ussuri River in Primorsky Krai and Khabarovsk Krai in the Russian Far East. The ecoregion is in the Palearctic realm, with a Humid Continental climate. It covers 187,357 km^{2} (72,339 sq mi).

== Location and description ==
The ecoregion covers a Z-shaped area in which the northern section is a 400 km band of forest north of Khabarovsk parallel to the Amur River (which is 20–30 km to the south), the vertical band of which parallels the Ussuri River (which is 20–30 km to the west) on the western slopes of the Sikhote-Alin Mountains, and the base of which is the eastern slope of the Sikhote-Alin in Primorsky Krai.

== Climate ==
The region has a Humid continental, cool summer climate (Koppen classification (Dwb)). This climate is characterized by high variation in temperature, both daily and seasonally; with dry winters and cool summers.

Climate at 46.75 N, 135.25 E

Climate chart (precipitation, max. and min. temperature)
| J | F | M | A | M | J | J | A | S | O | N | D |
| 0.5 6 −11 | 0.5 14 −5 | 0.9 28 10 | 1.6 47 28 | 2.7 59 40 | 3.5 68 50 | 5.1 74 58 | 5.3 74 58 | 3.8 66 47 | 2.1 51 32 | 1.2 29 12 | 0.7 11 −5 |
- █ Average max. and min. temperatures in °F
- █ Precipitation totals in inches
- Source: GlobalSpecies.org
Metric conversion
| J | F | M | A | M | J | J | A | S | O | N | D |
| 13 −14 −24 | 13 −10 −20 | 23 −2 −12 | 41 8 −2 | 69 15 4 | 89 20 10 | 130 23 14 | 135 24 14 | 97 19 8 | 53 11 0 | 30 −2 −11 | 18 −12 −21 |
- █ Average max. and min. temperatures in °C
- █ Precipitation totals in mm

== Flora and fauna ==
The Ussuri forests are the most biologically diverse in northern Asia. The maritime influence moderates the climate, precipitation is high enough to support rich forests, and the region is a boundary area between mountains, river flat lands, and sea coast.

The forests of the region are dominated by Korean pine (Pinus koraiensis), Mongolian oak (Quercus mongolica), Larix gmelinii, Larix sibirica, Larix × czekanowskii, Juniperus communis, Betula dahurica, Betula pendula, Pinus sibirica, Pinus sylvestris, Picea obovata, Abies sibirica, Quercus acutissima, Ginkgo biloba, Prunus serrulata, Prunus padus, Tilia amurensis, Salix babylonica, Acer palmatum, Populus tremula, Ulmus davidiana, Ulmus pumila, Pinus pumila, Haloxylon ammodendron, Elaeagnus angustifolia, Tamarix ramosissima, and Prunus sibirica.

Wildlife such as brown bears, Asian black bears, wolves, red foxes, Sika deer, wapiti, wild boars, and the Common raccoon dog inhabit the region. It is also home to the largest species of cat, the Siberian tiger.

== Protections ==
Notable protected areas of the Russian Federation in the ecoregion include:

- Bastak Nature Reserve, on the south-eastern spurs of the Bureya Range. (914 km^{2})
- Bolon Nature Reserve covering wetlands of the western approaches to Lake Bolon in the lower Amur River regions. (1,000 km^{2})
- Botcha Nature Reserve on the northeastern slopes of the Sikhote-Alin mountains. (2,674 km^{2})
- Komsomolsk Nature Reserve located where the Amur River cuts a narrow passage through the Sikhote-Alin. (643 km^{2})
- Khingan Nature Reserve includes forested spurs of the Lesser Khingan mountains. (940 km^{2})
- Sikhote-Alin Nature Reserve An IUCN class Ia "strict ecological reserve" (a Zapovednik). (4,016 km^{2})
- Ussurisky Nature Reserve, one of the remaining virgin mixed deciduous-conifer forests in the Primorsky (Maritime) region of the Russian Far East. Located on the western slopes of the Sikhote-Alin mountains. (404 km^{2})

These are all IUCN class Ia "strict ecological reserves" (zapovedniks).

== See also ==
- List of ecoregions in Russia
