= Troitskoye, Khabarovsk Krai =

Rural locality in Khabarovsk Krai, Russia

Coordinates: 49°26′35″N 136°33′06″E

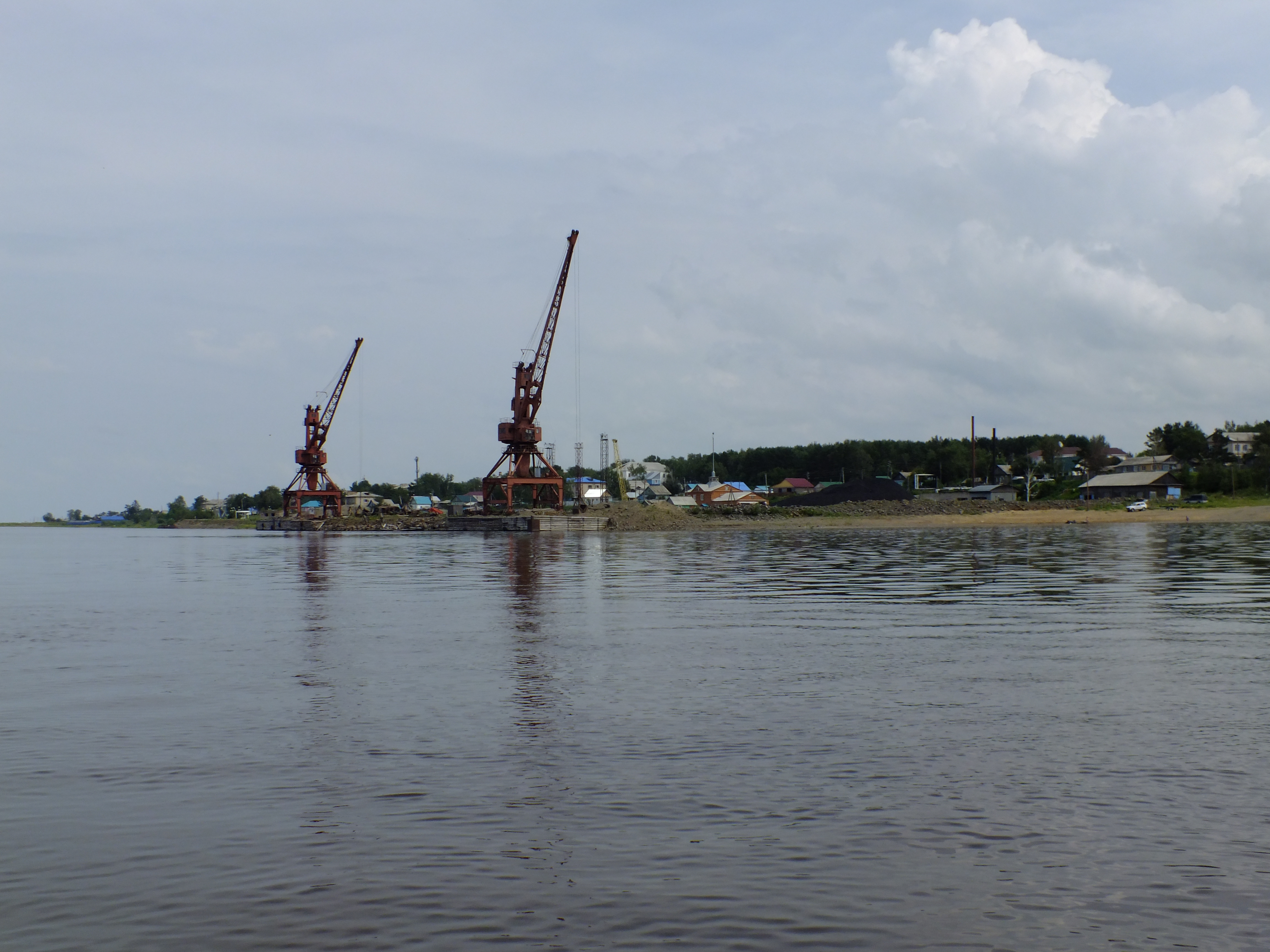
View of Troitskoye

Troitskoye (Russian: Троицкое) is a rural locality (a selo) and the administrative center of Nanaysky District, Khabarovsk Krai, Russia. Population: 5,143 (2010 census); 5,725 (2002 census); 6,015 (1989 Soviet census).
