= Nanaysky District =

Nanaysky District Нанайский район (Russian)
- District
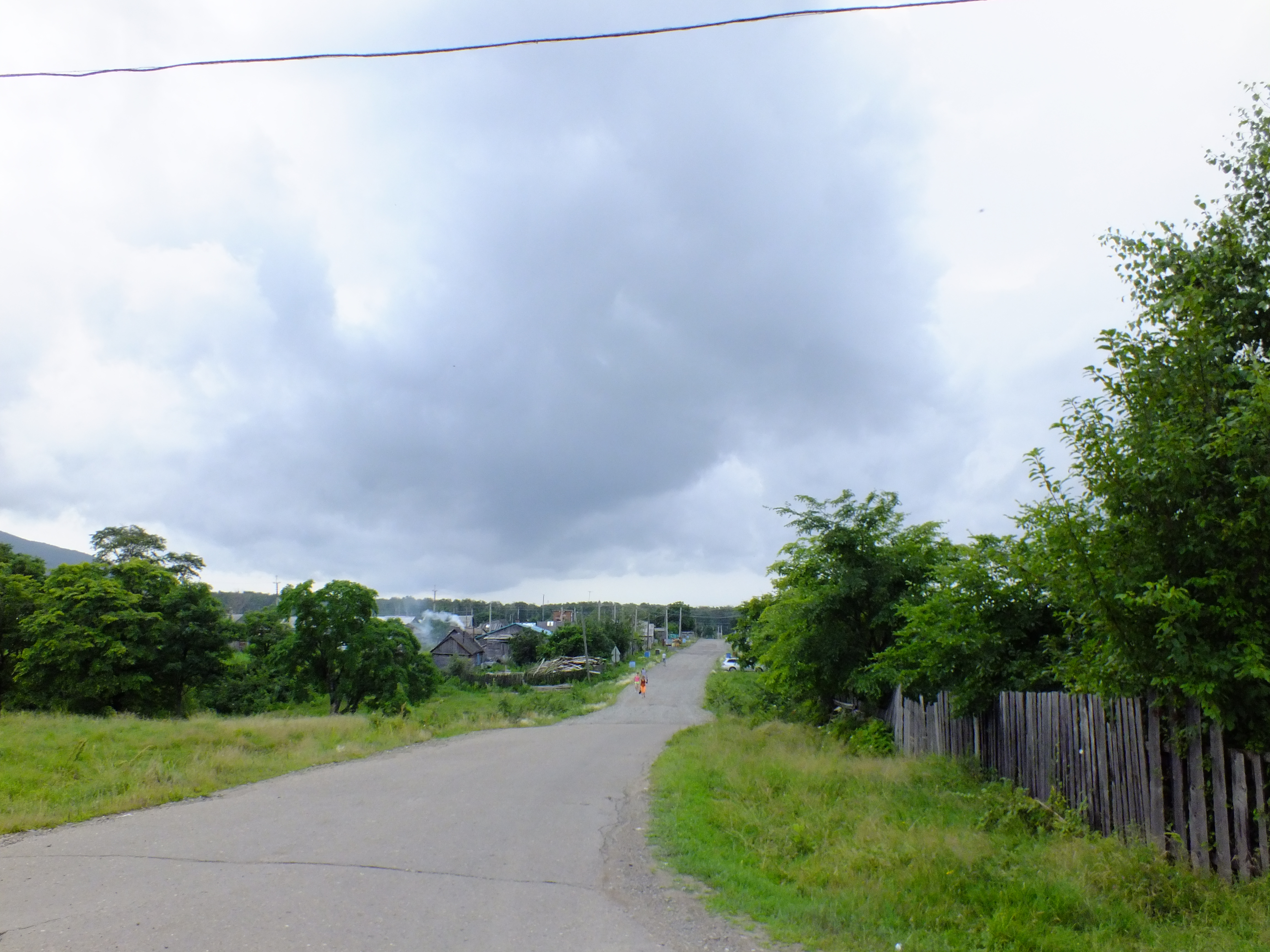
- Village Lidoga, Nanaysky District

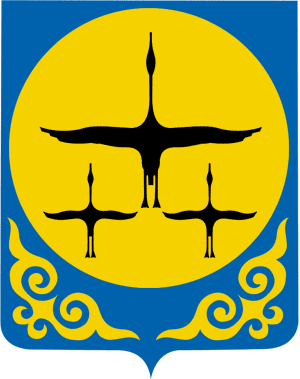
- Flag Coat of arms
- Location of Nanaysky District in Khabarovsk Krai
- Coordinates: 49°26′27″N 136°33′09″E
- Country: Russia
- Federal subject: Khabarovsk Krai
- Established: 1934
- Administrative center: Troitskoye

Area
  - Total: 27,644 km^{2} (10,673 sq mi)

Population (2010 Census)
  - Total: 17,491
  - Density: 0.63272/km^{2} (1.6387/sq mi)
  - Urban: 0%
  - Rural: 100%

Administrative structure
  - Inhabited localities: 20 rural localities

Municipal structure
  - Municipally incorporated as: Nanaysky Municipal District
  - Municipal divisions: 0 urban settlements, 14 rural settlements
- Time zone: UTC+10 (MSK+7)
- OKTMO ID: 08628000

Nanaysky District (Russian: Нана́йский райо́н) is an administrative and municipal district (raion), one of the seventeen in Khabarovsk Krai, Russia. The area of the district is 27,644 square kilometers (10,673 sq mi). Its administrative center is the rural locality (a selo) of Troitskoye. Population: 17,491 (2010 census); 19,377 (2002 census); 21,168 (1989 Soviet census). The population of Troitskoye accounts for 29.4% of the district's total population.

Anyuysky National Park is located in Nanaysky District.

== Geography ==
The Gur Swamps (Russian: Гурское болото) are an important wetland area located on the right bank of the Gur river in the district.
