= 2024 Khabarovsk Krai gubernatorial election =

Election

← 2021	6–8 September 2024	2029 →
- Turnout: 32.84%
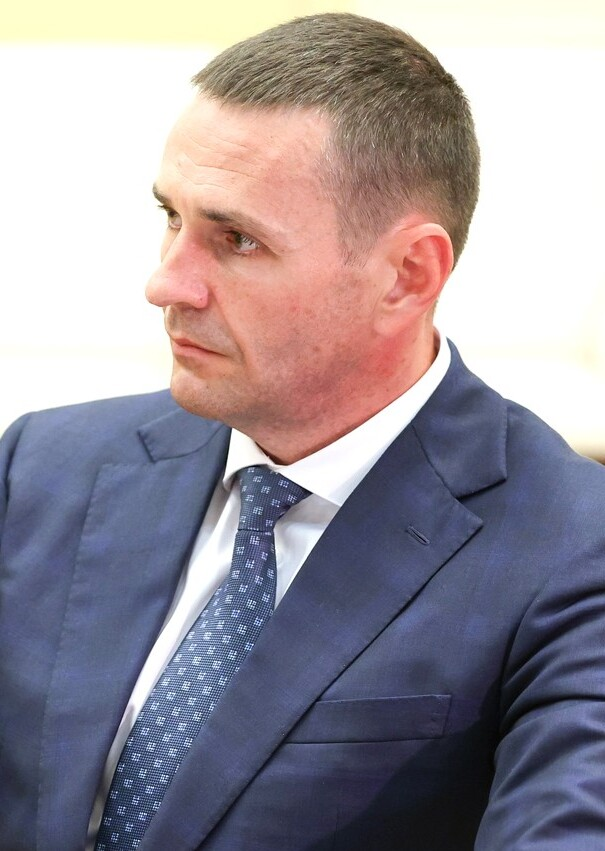
		CPRF
Candidate	Dmitry Demeshin	Pyotr Perevezentsev
Party	United Russia	Communist Party
Popular vote	254,245	25,112
Percentage	81.03%	8.00%
- Results by municipalities
Governor before election
Dmitry Demeshin (acting)
Independent
Governor-elect
Dmitry Demeshin
United Russia

The 2024 Khabarovsk Krai gubernatorial election took place on 6–8 September 2024, on common election day, coinciding with 2024 Khabarovsk Krai Legislative Duma election. Acting Governor Dmitry Demeshin was elected for a full term in office.

== Background ==
Then–State Duma member and Chairman of the Duma Committee on Sport Mikhail Degtyarev was appointed acting Governor of Khabarovsk Krai in July 2020, replacing fellow Liberal Democratic Party member Sergey Furgal who was arrested earlier in July on suspicion of organising two murders and one murder attempt. Degtyarev faced opposition from Furgal's supporters for his denouncement of the protest movement, firings of Krai Government officials and appointment of Moscow and Samara natives to his administration, which resulted in prominent Furgal allies such as both Federation Council Senators from the krai Yelena Greshnyakova and Sergey Bezdenezhnykh, Khabarovsk City Duma Speaker Mikhail Sidorov and Anton Furgal, the eldest son of the former governor, leaving Liberal Democratic Party in protest. Nevertheless, Degtyarev easily won the subsequent gubernatorial election in the first round with 56.81% of the vote, while TV presenter and actress Marina Kim (SR–ZP) placed second with 25.39%.

In early May 2024 Governor Degtyarev was mentioned as potential future Minister of Sport along with current Deputy Minister Odes Baysultanov. On May 11, 2024, re-appointed Prime Minister Mikhail Mishustin nominated Governor Mikhail Degtyarev to serve in his second cabinet as Minister of Sport, replacing Oleg Matytsin. State Duma Committee on Physical Culture and Sport unanimously supported Degtyarev's nomination on May 12, while the full chamber voted 350–0–79 to approve Degtyarev as new Minister of Sport two days later. Degtyarev became the only non–United Russia party member, excluding Independents, to serve in the Mishustin's Cabinet and the first one since 2004, as well as the first federal Minister from the Liberal Democratic Party since Sergey Kalashnikov, who served as Minister of Labour and Social Development in 1998–2000.

After his nomination, Governor Degtyarev left Khabarovsk on May 12, 2024, leaving First Deputy Governor Aleksandr Nikitin as acting Governor until the temporary replacement be appointed by the President. Nikitin was considered a potential candidate for the appointment, while other mentioned candidates included Senators Andrey Bazilevsky of Khabarovsk Krai and Konstantin Basyuk of Kherson Oblast, Head of Rosreestr Oleg Skufinsky, Deputy Presidential Envoy to the Far Eastern Federal District Denis Andreyev and Deputy Prosecutor-General of Russia Dmitry Demeshin. On May 15 President Vladimir Putin appointed Dmitry Demeshin as acting Governor of Khabarovsk Krai.

== Candidates ==
In Khabarovsk Krai candidates for Governor can be nominated only by registered political parties. Candidate for Governor of Khabarovsk Krai should be a Russian citizen and at least 30 years old. Candidates for Governor should not have a foreign citizenship or residence permit. Each candidate in order to be registered is required to collect at least 8% of signatures of members and heads of municipalities. Also gubernatorial candidates present 3 candidacies to the Federation Council and election winner later appoints one of the presented candidates.

=== Declared ===
Candidate name, political party		Occupation	Status	Ref.
Roza Chemeris; New People	Roza Chemeris	Member of State Duma (2021–present); December 2018 Primorsky Krai For Women of Russia gubernatorial candidate	Registered	
Dmitry Demeshin; United Russia		Acting Governor of Khabarovsk Krai (2024–present); Former Deputy Prosecutor-General of Russia (2019–2024)	Registered	
Pyotr Perevezentsev; Communist Party		Commissioner for Children's Rights of Khabarovsk Krai (2022–present); Former Member of Legislative Assembly of Amur Oblast (2016–2021); Former Member of Legislative Duma of Khabarovsk Krai (1995–2001); 2021 gubernatorial candidate	Registered	
Sergey Prokopyev; Communists of Russia		Businessman	Registered	
Andrey Smalis; Cossack Party		Gas refining construction executive	Failed to qualify	
Mikhail Sidorov; SR–ZP		Member of Khabarovsk City Duma (2019–2024); Former Chairman of the City Duma (2019–2021)	Did not file	
Konstantin Mogilny; Civic Platform		Agriculture fund executive	Withdrew	
Yevgeny Shestyuk; Rodina		Agriculture businessman	Withdrew	
Aleksandr Terekhov; Party of Pensioners		Businessman	Withdrew	

=== Declined ===
- Anton Furgal, entrepreneur, son of former governor Sergey Furgal
- Irina Zikunova (LDPR), Chairwoman of the Legislative Duma of Khabarovsk Krai (2019–present)

=== Candidates for Federation Council ===
Gubernatorial candidate, political party	Candidates for Federation Council	Status
Dmitry Demeshin; United Russia	* Andrey Bazilevsky, incumbent Senator (2021–present) * Natalia Bolonyayeva, former Member of Legislative Duma of Khabarovsk Krai (2014–2019), Consultative and Diagnostic Center chief doctor * Andrey Seryozhnikov, former Head of FSB Office in Khabarovsk Krai (2016–2022)	Registered

== Finances ==
All sums are in rubles.

Financial Report	Source	Chemeris	Demeshin	Mogilny	Perevezentsev	Prokopyev	Shestyk	Sidorov	Smalis	Terekhov
First		2,559,000	20,420,000	400,000	1,860,000	400,000	20,400,000	20,000	400,000	20,400,000
Final		5,993,500	77,068,280	400,000	4,397,300	17,074,000	20,400,000	20,000	400,000	20,400,000

== Results ==
Summary of the 6–8 September 2024 Khabarovsk Krai gubernatorial election results
Candidate	Party	Votes	%
Dmitry Demeshin (incumbent)	United Russia	254,245	81.03
Pyotr Perevezentsev	Communist Party	25,112	8.00
Roza Chemeris	New People	15,250	4.86
Sergey Prokopyev	Communists of Russia	9,325	2.97
Valid votes		303,932	96.86
Blank ballots		9,844	3.14
Total		313,776	100.00
Turnout		313,776	32.84
Registered voters		955,360	100.00

Governor Demeshin appointed retired Federal Security Service lieutenant general Andrey Seryozhnikov (Independent) to the Federation Council, replacing incumbent Senator Andrey Bazilevsky (United Russia).

== See also ==
- 2024 Russian regional elections
