= 2021 Khabarovsk Krai gubernatorial election =

- 17–19 September 2021
- Turnout: 43.82%
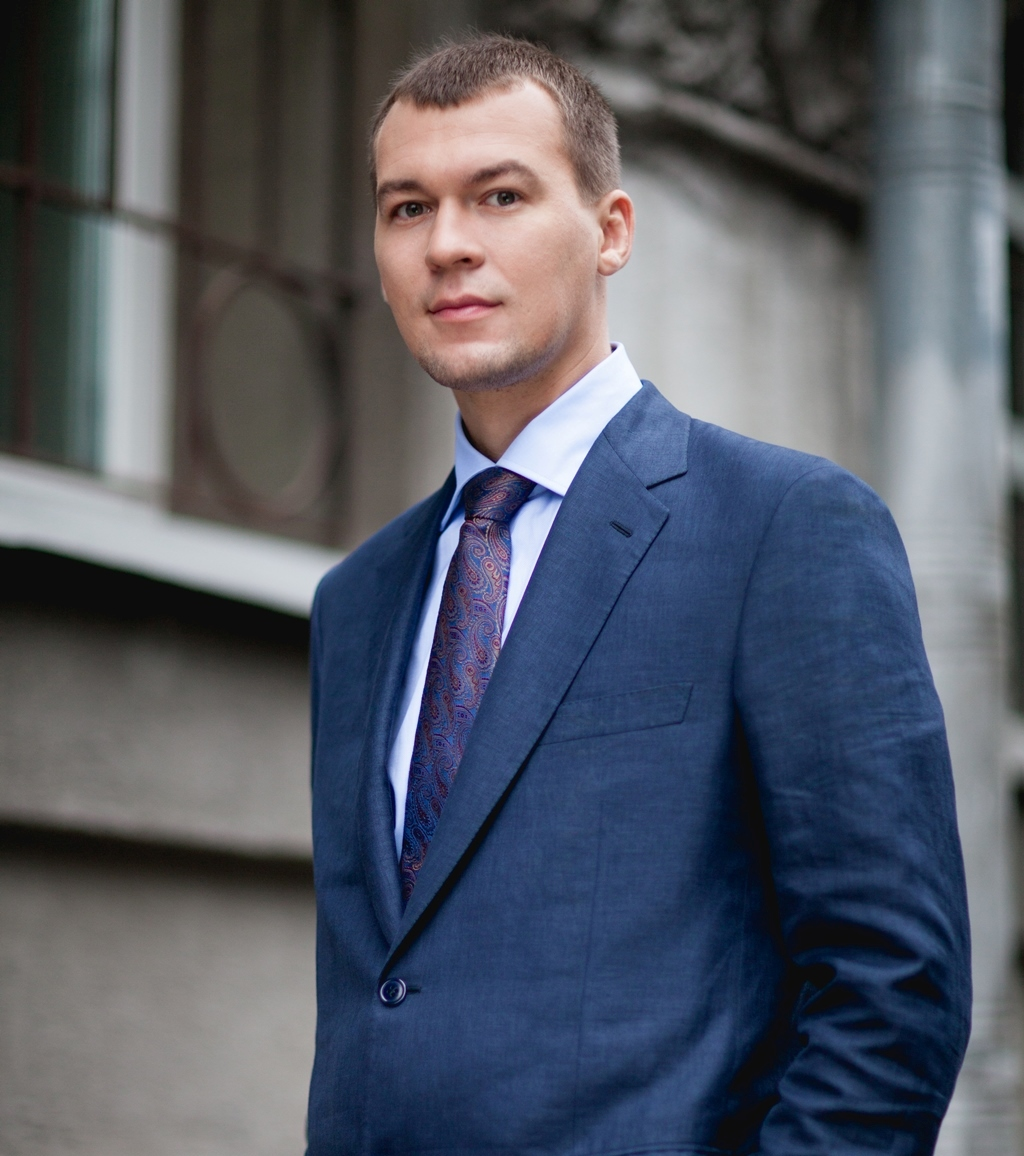

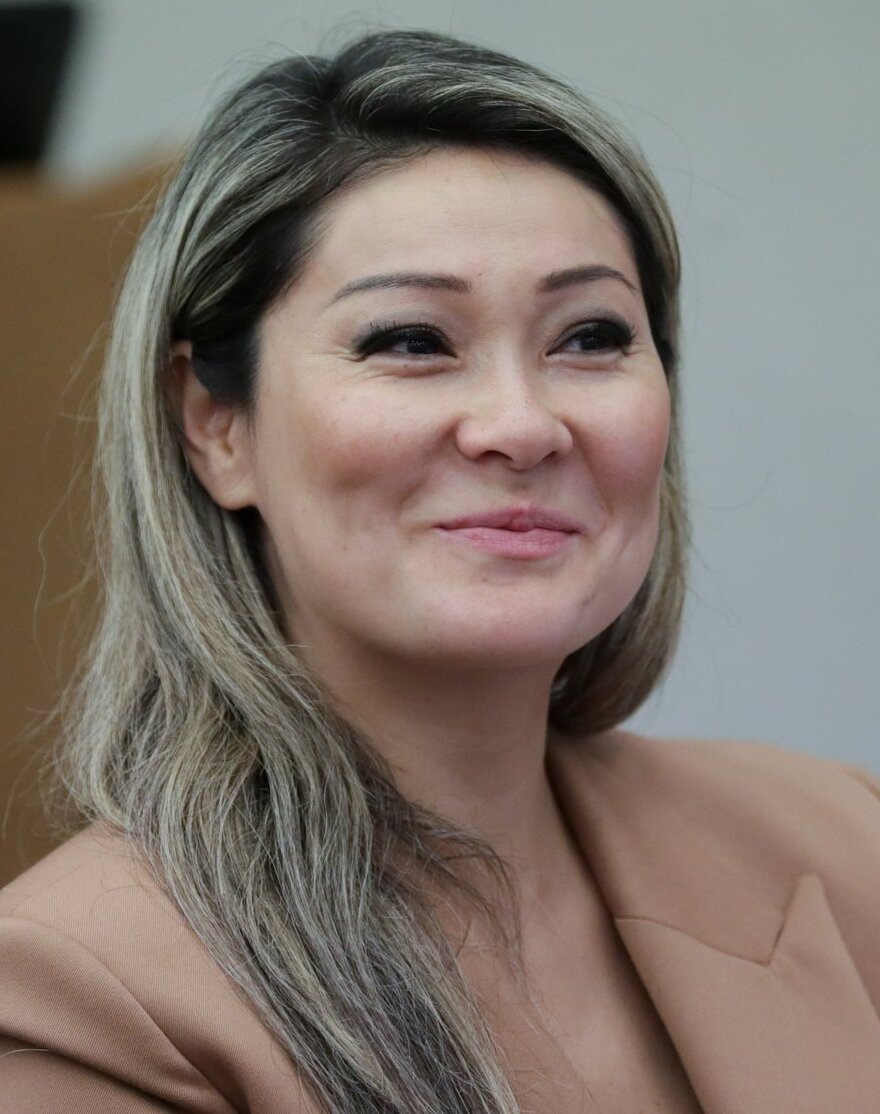
			RPPSS
Candidate	Mikhail Degtyarev	Marina Kim	Vladimir Parfenov
Party	LDPR	SR-ZP	RPPSS
Popular vote	237,818	106,532	41,986
Percentage	56.77%	25.43%	10.02%
- Results by administrative division
Governor before election
Mikhail Degtyarev (acting)
LDPR
Elected Governor
Mikhail Degtyarev
LDPR

The 2021 Khabarovsk Krai gubernatorial election took place on 17–19 September 2021, on common election day, coinciding with election to the State Duma. On 9 July 2020 Governor Sergei Furgal was arrested on charges of involvement in multiple murders. Furgal was removed from office by President Vladimir Putin on 20 July, and fellow LDPR member Mikhail Degtyarev was appointed as acting Governor.

Mikhail Degtyarev won the election becoming the second consecutive member of LDPR elected as Governor of Khabarovsk Krai.

== Background ==
Sergei Furgal was unexpectedly elected Governor of Khabarovsk Krai in September 2018, defeating sitting Governor Vyacheslav Shport by a margin of 41 percentage points. Furgal quickly became a popular figure in regional politics earning an informal title of "People's Governor". At some point Sergei Furgal's popularity rate was higher than that of President Putin in Khabarovsk Krai. In 2019 Khabarovsk regional and local elections LDPR cruised to several landslide victories: the party simultaneously won 30 of 36 seats in Khabarovsk Krai Legislative Duma, 34 of 35 seats in Khabarovsk City Duma, 24 of 25 seats in Komsomolsk-on-Amur City Duma and mayorship in Komsomolsk-on-Amur. LDPR candidate Ivan Pilyaev even captured Furgal's former seat in the State Duma, United Russia candidate singer Vika Tsiganova only placed third. Presidential Envoy to the Far Eastern Federal District Yury Trutnev also, allegedly, had poor relations with Governor Furgal for his lack of cooperation and support of United Russia.

In March 2019 former Governor of Khabarovsk Krai (1991–2009) Viktor Ishayev was arrested in Moscow, he was later charged with fraud during his tenure as vice president of Rosneft. Viktor Ishayev was considered as Sergei Furgal's ally and several affiliated with Ishayev politicians worked in Furgal Administration (namely, First Deputy Chairman of the Khabarovsk Krai Government Igor Averin, Deputy Chairman of the Government for Security and Cooperation with Federal Authorities Vladimir Khlapov, and Minister of Finance Aleksandr Katsuba). In April 2019 Deputy Chairman of the Investigative Committee Igor Krasnov reopened cases regarding killings of several businessmen in Khabarovsk Krai and Amur Oblast committed during 2004 and 2005. First arrests concerning reopened cases occurred in November 2019 when MVD and FSB agents arrested former Khabarovsk Krai Legislative Duma member Nikolay Mistryukov and three other individuals, they were charged with the murders of businessmen Yevgeny Zorya in 2004 and Oleg Bulatov in 2005, they were also accused of attempting to kill Aleksandr Smolsky in 2004. Law enforcement officials also carried out searches and seized documents in the offices of "Torex" group (owned by Nikolay Mistryukov and Furgal's wife Larisa Starodubova), Deputy Chairman of the Government Yury Zolochevsky and Minister of Industry Sergey Denisenko. Nikolay Mistrykov testified against Sergei Furgal while he was being detained in Lefortovo Prison.

On 9 July 2020 Sergei Furgal was arrested and escorted to Moscow by FSB and SK agents. He was accused of 2 assassinations and 1 assassination attempt. Alongside Governor Furgal, four of his associates were detained: Khabarovsk Krai Legislative Duma members Dmitry Kozlov and Sergey Kuznetsov, entrepreneurs Nikolay Shukhov and Yevgeny Averyanov.

Sergei Furgal's arrest sparked mass protests. On 11 July 2020 11,000-12,000 people took part in a rally in Khabarovsk to support arrested Governor. The protesters believed Furgal's arrest was politically motivated and was an act of revenge from federal authorities for Furgal's independent style of governance. On 18 July an even larger crowd of 50,000 to 80,000 people took the streets of Khabarovsk. Protests also were held in multiple cities all across Russia: from Yuzhno-Sakhalinsk to Saint Petersburg. In Khabarovsk itself continuous pickets were held throughout summer, autumn and even winter 2020–2021.

While Sergei Furgal was detained, a search for his successor has started. Among the considered candidates were Khabarovsk Airport Board of Directors chairman Konstantin Basyuk, LDPR State Duma member Mikhail Degtyarev, Deputy Presidential Envoy to the Far Eastern Federal District Grigory Kuranov, First Deputy Chairman of Krai Government Yury Zolochevsky and former Deputy Chairman of Krai Government (2011–2015) Andrey Bazilevsky. However, due to ongoing unrests in Khabarovsk and increasing unpopularity of United Russia in the region it was decided to appoint member of LDPR, a party Furgal was member of. Party's shortlist included State Duma member from Primorsky Krai Andrey Andreychenko, chairman of the Duma Committee on Sport Mikhail Degtyarev, and chairman of the Duma Committee on Economy and Entrepreneurship Sergey Zhigarev. On 20 July 2020, 11 days after Sergei Furgal's arrest, President Vladimir Putin fired Furgal for the "loss of trust" and appointed Mikhail Degtyarev as acting Governor of Khabarovsk Krai.

Mikhail Degtyarev quickly draw an ire from Furgal's supporters for his denouncement of protest movement, firings of Krai Government officials and appointment of Moscow and Samara natives to his administration. In August 2020 Degtyarev became acting coordinator of LDPR regional office in Khabarovsk Krai, he was elected to full capacity in February 2021. Mikhail Degtyarev clashed with local LDPR leaders, as the result several prominent politicians left the party, including both Federation Council senators Yelena Greshnyakova and Sergey Bezdenezhnykh, Sergei Furgal's eldest son Anton, Khabarovsk City Duma Speaker Mikhail Sidorov and 7 other City Duma members. Greshnyakova, Bezndenezhnykh and Sidorov were favourites to mount a "pro-Furgal" challenge to Degtyarev in upcoming gubernatorial election, but all of them ultimately declined with Greshnyakova and Sidorov opting to run for State Duma instead.

== Candidates ==
Only political parties can nominate candidates for gubernatorial election in Khabarovsk Krai, self-nomination is not possible. However, candidate is not obliged to be a member of the nominating party. Candidate for Governor of Khabarovsk Krai should be a Russian citizen and at least 30 years old. Candidates for Governor should not have a foreign citizenship or residence permit. Each candidate in order to be registered is required to collect at least 8% of signatures of members and heads of municipalities (201-211 signatures). Also gubernatorial candidates present 3 candidacies to the Federation Council and election winner later appoints one of the presented candidates.

=== Registered candidates ===
- Mikhail Degtyarev (LDPR), acting Governor of Khabarovsk Krai, former Member of the State Duma (2011–2020), 2013 and 2018 Moscow mayoral candidate
- Marina Kim (SR-ZP), TV host and actress
- Babek Mamedov (Rodina), general director of LLP "Sfera"
- Vladimir Parfenov (RPPSS), pensioner, husband of Mikhail Degtyarev's press secretary

=== Denied registration ===
- Vladimir Chernyshov (New People), journalist, former chairman of the regional Committee on Press and Mass Communications (2013–2015)
- Igor Logvinov (ZA!), executive director of LLP "EkoCity", Member of Yuzhno-Sakhalinsk City Duma
- Petr Perevezentsev (CPRF), first secretary of CPRF Khabarovsk Krai Committee, former Member of Khabarovsk Krai Legislative Duma (1997–2001)

=== Withdrawn candidates ===
- Mikael Bagdasaryan (The Greens), head of legal department at "Rost Regionov" foundation

=== Declined ===
- Sergey Bezdenezhnykh, Senator of the Federation Council
- Yelena Greshnyakova, Senator of the Federation Council (running for State Duma from RPPSS)
- Maksim Kukushkin (RPSS), Member of Khabarovsk Krai Legislative Duma (running for State Duma)
- Gennady Maltsev (United Russia), Vice Chairman of the Khabarovsk Krai Legislative Duma, 2004 gubernatorial candidate

=== Candidates for the Federation Council ===
Incumbent Senator Yelena Greshnyakova (Independent) was not renominated

- Mikhail Degtyarev (LDPR):
  - Andrey Bazilevsky, Deputy Chairman of Khabarovsk Krai Government for Domestic Policy
  - Oksana Kozhemyako, chief doctor at Krai Blood Transfusion Station
  - Georgy Perov, vice chair of the regional Submariners' Veteran Organisation
- Marina Kim (SR-ZP):
  - Valentin Bukhantsev, former member of Khabarovsk Krai Legislative Duma (1997–2005)
  - Igor Glukhov, general director of the "Press Distribution Agency "Express", chair of the A Just Russia regional office, 2018 gubernatorial candidate
  - Natalia Suslova, general director of LLP "Business Centre NIKA"
- Babek Mamedov (Rodina):
  - Yevgeny Yegorychev, head of sales department at LLP "Kubaba"
  - Raisa Ivanchak, member of Khabarovsk Krai Civic Chamber
  - Alena Martynova, former general director of Krai Centre for Youth Initiatives
- Vladimir Parfenov (RPPSS):
  - Vyacheslav Vororbyev, endoscopy doctor
  - Natalya Yevdokimova, military lecturer
  - Andrey Tretyakov, individual entrepreneur

== Finances ==
All sums are in rubles.

Financial Report	Source	Chernyshov	Degtyarev	Kim	Logvinov	Mamedov	Parfenov	Perevezentsev
First		65,200	5,067,000	42,950	4,850	92,000	68,100	TBA
Final		77,730	74,168,999	1,196,050	4,850	7,188,300	33,668,100	150,000

== Results ==
Acting Governor Mikhail Degtyarev (LDPR) won the election in the first round with nearly 57% of the vote. His nearest challenger, TV host Marina Kim (SR-ZP) scored more than 25% of the vote receiving the best statewide result for A Just Russia candidate in history of Khabarovsk Krai. Kim was also the second candidate of Korean descent after Valentin Tsoi in 1996 and the second woman to place second in the Khabarovsk Krai gubernatorial election.

Summary of the 17-19 September 2021 Khabarovsk Krai gubernatorial election results
Candidate	Party	Votes	%
Mikhail Degtyarev (incumbent)	Liberal Democratic Party	237,818	56.77
Marina Kim	A Just Russia — For Truth	106,532	25.43
Vladimir Parfenov	Party of Pensioners	41,986	10.02
Babek Mamedov	Rodina	14,806	3.53
Valid votes		401,142	95.75
Blank ballots		17,790	4.25
Total		418,932	100.00
Turnout		418,932	43.82
Registered voters		958,412	100.00

On 20 September Governor-elect Mikhail Degtyarev announced that he would nominate his deputy Andrey Bazilevsky as next Senator from Khabarovsk Krai, replacing incumbent Yelena Greshnyakova. On 24 September Andrey Bazilevsky officially became a Federation Council Senator.
