= Sergey Bezdenezhnykh =

Russian politician (born 1979)

- Сергей Безденежных
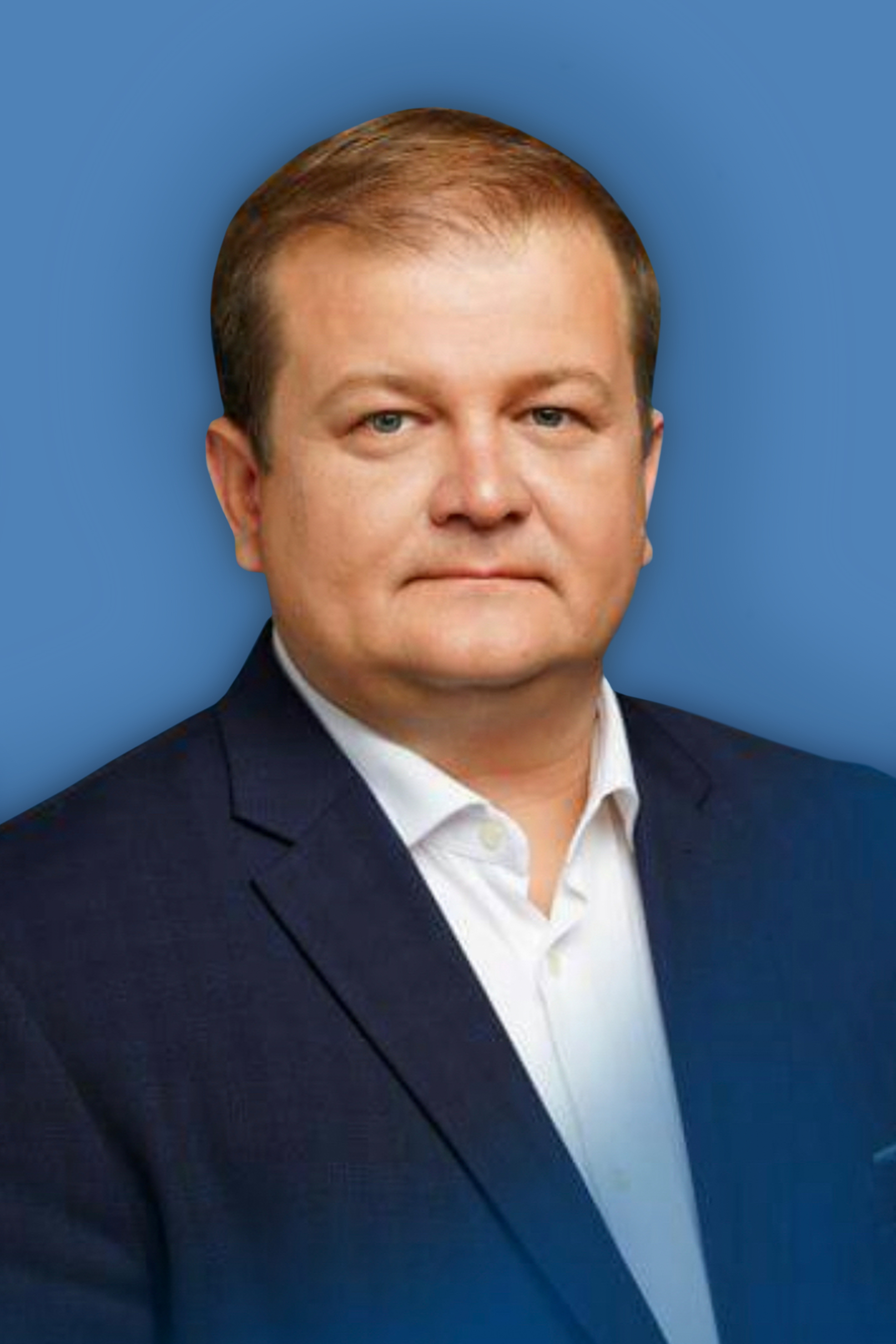

Member of Legislative Duma of Khabarovsk Krai
- Incumbent
- Assumed office 8 September 2024
- Constituency: SR–ZP party list
- In office 8 September 2019 – 5 December 2019
- Preceded by: Irina Shtepa
- Succeeded by: Natalya Chumakova
- Constituency: Topolevsky No.4
- In office 1 October 2014 – 8 September 2019
- Constituency: LDPR party list

Senator from Khabarovsk Krai
- In office 5 December 2019 – 11 September 2024
- Preceded by: Dmitry Priyatnov
- Succeeded by: Viktor Kalashnikov

Personal details
- Born: 25 August 1979 (age 47) Amursk, Khabarovsk Krai, Russian SFSR, Soviet Union
- Party: SR–ZP (since 2022); Independent (2021–2022); LDPR (1994–2021)
- Education: Pacific National University

Sergey Vyacheslavovich Bezdenezhnykh (Russian: Сергей Вячеславович Безденежных; born 25 August 1979) is a Russian politician and businessman serving as a Member of Legislative Duma of Khabarovsk Krai. He served as a Senator from Khabarovsk Krai from 2019 to 2024.

== Biography ==
=== Early life and career ===
Sergey Bezdenezhnykh was born on 25 August 1979 in Amursk (Khabarovsk Krai). His father was an electrician and his mother was a kindergarten teacher.

In 1994 Bezdenezhnykh joined Liberal Democratic Party of Russia. He later was an aide to State Duma member Sergey Semyonov in 1998–2000 (Semyonov lost re-election in 1999). Simultaneously, Sergey Bezdenezhnykh was a member of Political Consultative Council under Governor Viktor Ishayev in 1998–1999. Bezdenezhnykh later was a member of Council of Political Parties under Khabarovsk Mayor Aleksandr Sokolov.

Sergey Bezdenezhnykh graduated Khabarovsk State Industrial Economic College in 2005 with a diploma in legal. In 2005–2006 Bezdenezhnykh worked as a jurist in timber trading company LLP "Alkuma", which was owned by Khabarovsk LDPR leader Sergey Furgal. Since 2006 Sergey Bezdenezhnykh was general director of Alkuma. In 2007 Bezdenezhnykh was chairman of the board of directors of retailer "KM".

In 2005–2014 Sergey Bezdenezhnykh served as and aide to Khabarovsk Krai Legislative Duma members Nikolay Mistryukov (business partner of Sergey Furgal) and Vyacheslav Furgal (elder brother of Sergey Furgal). Bezdenezhnykh also was a member of Khabarovsk's Industrial District Territorial Electoral Commission in 2008–2014.

In 2009 Bezdenezhnykh graduated Pacific State University with a diploma in law.

Sergey Bezdenezhnykh ran for Khabarovsk City Duma in 2009. He placed third (among three candidates) in Constituency No.16 with 23.95% of the vote, losing to incumbent Izabella Proshina (CPRF, 42.33%).

In 2010 Bezdenezhnykh ran for Khabarovsk Krai Legislative Duma as No.3 in LDPR party list's Industrial territorial group and in Promyshlenny constituency No.5. In the constituency Bezdenezhnykh placed fourth with 12.85% of the vote.

In 2011 Sergey Bezdenezhnykh ran for the Head of Korfovsky. He won 23.73% of the vote and placed third among three candidates.

=== Legislative Duma of Khabarovsk Krai (2014–2019) ===
Sergey Bezdenezhnykh again ran for Khabarovsk Krai Legislative Duma in 2014 as No.1 in LDPR party list's Khabarovsk territorial group. LDPR received 13.34% of the vote and was given 3 mandates which went to party leader Vladimir Zhirinovsky, Sergey Furgal's aide Yelena Greshnyakova and incumbent deputy Vyacheslav Furgal. However, Zhirinovsky gave up his mandate which was awarded to Sergey Bezdenezhnykh.

In Legislative Duma Sergey Bezdenezhnykh was a member of Committee on Budget, Taxes and Economic Development and Committee on Industry, Entrepreneurship and Infrastructure.

In 2015 Bezdenezhnykh left his position as general director of LLP "Alkuma" and registered as individual entrepreneur.

Sergey Bezdenezhnykh in 2018 ran in an open-seat contest for the Mayor of Khabarovsk as incumbent Mayor Aleksandr Sokolov declined to seek a fifth term. Bezdenezhnykh won 20.86% and placed third after Vice Mayor Sergey Kravchuk (United Russia, 39.97%) and Maksim Kukushkin (CPRF, 23.85%). Sergey Bezdenezhnykh notably underperformed in the election compared to Sergey Furgal who in the concurrent gubernatorial election defeated Vyacheslav Shport in the city of Khabarovsk.

In January–September 2019 Bezdenezhnykh held the position of deputy general director for legal affairs at LLP "Neomaks-Biznes". He was also a member of Coordinating Council of the Ministry of Justice Administration for Khabarovsk Krai and Jewish Autonomous Oblast.

Sergey Bezdenezhnykh ran for re-election to the Legislative Duma in 2019 in the newly created suburban Topolevsky constituency No.4 in Khabarovsky District. Bezdenezhnykh won the election with 46.74% of the vote, defeating Chairman of the Khabarovsky District Assembly of Deputies Dmitry Savchenko (United Russia, 21.56%) and three other candidates.

As LDPR took control of the Legislative Duma, Bezdenezhnykh was placed into the Duma leadership and chaired the Committee on Governmental Structure and Local Government. He also became deputy chair of the Liberal Democratic Party caucus.

=== Federation Council (2019–2024) ===
Initially, Legislative Duma of Khabarovsk Krai chose Dmitry Priyatnov (LDPR) as its next Representative in the Federation Council, who would replace longtime Senator Viktor Ozerov. Priyatnov was confirmed on 23 October 2019. However, soon after an information appeared that Priyatnov had an expired criminal record for forgery which was not registered by the Electoral Commission. Amid the controversy, Dmitry Priyatnov resigned from the Federation Council on 31 October citing "personal reasons". Priyatnov later resigned from the Legislative Duma.

In late November 2019 LDPR caucus in Legislative Duma nominated Sergey Bezdenezhnykh to be a Member of the Federation Council, his only opponent was Maksim Kukushkin, nominated by CPRF. On 4 December Bezdenezhnykh was elected as Senator from Khabarovsk Krai with 24 votes, including Vice Speaker from United Russia Gennady Maltsev.

In the Federation Council Sergey Bezdenezhnykh joined the Committee on Defense and Security.

Governor Sergey Furgal was arrested on 9 July 2020 on charges of assassination attempt of his business competitors on 2004–2005. The arrest sparked mass protests in Khabarovsk and other Russian cities. Furgal was replaced by Mikhail Degtyarev as Governor of Khabarovsk Krai on 20 July. Senator Bezdenezhnykh publicly named Degtyarev a "temporary figure" and confirmed LDPR's support of Sergey Furgal.

In February 2021 acting Governor Degtyarev was elected coordinator of the LDPR Khabarovsk regional office. A new coordinating council of the regional office was elected but both senators Sergey Bezdenezhnykh and Yelena Greshnyakova were not nominated and lost their position in party's leadership.

In May 2021 Sergey Bezdenezhnykh left Liberal Democratic Party of Russia due to Degtyarev's ban on support of arrested Governor Furgal. LDPR urged Senator Bezdenezhnykh to resign but he declined. Earlier in April fellow Senator Yelena Greshnyakova left the party which also sparked Zhirinovsky's son Igor Lebedev offensive comments towards Greshnyakova urging her to resign.

Sergey Bezdenezhnykh was viewed as a high-profile candidate in upcoming gubernatorial election. Bezdenezhnykh ultimately declined to run and endorsed Yelena Greshnyakova who also considered to mount a "Pro-Furgal" challenge to acting Governor Mikhail Degtyarev. Senator Greshnyakova also later declined and ran for State Duma instead.

In September 2021 Khabarovsk Krai Legislative Duma Speaker Irina Zikunova retrieved Bezdenezhnykh's cabinet in Duma which was viewed as a punishment for Bezdenezhnykh feud with Krai leadership.

On 15 December 2021 Bezdenezhnykh was among 4 senators to vote against the bill "On common principles of public authority in subjects of the Russian Federation".

On 29 March 2022 Senator Bezdenezhnykh joined A Just Russia — For Truth political party, alongside 10 municipal deputies in Khabarovsk Krai, who previously left LDPR citing party's resistance to their support for former Governor Sergey Furgal. Bezdenezhnykh was put in charge of party activity in the four territories internationally recognised as part of Ukraine – Donetsk People's Republic, Luhansk People's Republic, Kherson Oblast, and Zaporozhye Oblast, in 2022. In 2023 Bezdenezhnykh was appointed to the Presidium of the Central Council of A Just Russia, the highest governing body within the party. In July 2023 he was appointed chairman of the Zabaykalsky Krai party regional office after the whole office was sacked and expelled from the party, Bezdenezhnykh was tasked with re-building party infrastructure for the upcoming legislative election, where A Just Russia placed 4th with 6.29% of the vote losing two of its three deputies.

=== Return to the Legislative Duma (2024–present) ===
In July 2024 Senator Bezdenezhnykh was announced as head of the A Just Russia – For Truth party list for the 2024 Khabarovsk Krai Legislative Duma election, he also filed to run in the Promyshlenny single-mandate constituency No.13 located in southern Khabarovsk. A Just Russia nominated a strong slate of candidates, including local party leaders, pro-Furgal deputies expelled from LDPR and CPRF, and former social sphere officials, however, the party was expected to gain no more that two-three mandates. A Just Russia received 7.32% of the vote and sole mandate in the Duma, which went to Bezdenezhnykh. In the constituency Bezdenezhnykh placed 3rd with 13.27%, losing to Khabarovsky District head Aleksandr Yats (United Russia).

Despite being elected to the Legislative Duma Bezdenezhnykh had slim chances to retain his seat in the Federation Council as United Russia received an overwhelming majority. On September 26, 2024, Legislative Duma unanimously voted for United Russia member Viktor Kalashnikov to replace Bezdenezhnykh in the Federation Council. Bezdenezhnykh remained member of the Duma becoming leader of A Just Russia – For Truth faction (and its sole member), as well as joining the committee on industry, entrepreneurship, and infrastructure.

== Personal life ==
Sergey Bezdenezhnykh is married and has a daughter.

His hobbies include alpine skiing and diving.

Until September 2019 Bezdenezhnykh was a founder of Khabarovsk regional charity organisation "Civic Vector". In 2016–2019 Bezdenezhnykh held a 33.3% shares of LLP "Gosavtoshkola" (State Driving School).

=== Sanctions ===
Sergey Bezdenezhnykh was sanctioned by the UK government in 2022 in relation to the Russo-Ukrainian War. For the same reason he was also put under sanctions by the European Union, Canada, Switzerland, Australia, Ukraine, and the United States of America.

== Electoral history ==
=== 2009 ===
Summary of the 1 March 2009 Khabarovsk City Duma election in District 16
Candidate	Party	Votes	%
Izabella Proshina (incumbent)	Communist Party	1,032	42.33%
Yevgeny Ravkin	United Russia	754	30.93%
Sergey Bezdenezhnykh	Liberal Democratic Party	584	23.95%
Total		2,438	100%

=== 2010 ===
Summary of the 14 March 2010 Legislative Duma of Khabarovsk Krai election in Promyshlenny constituency No.5
Candidate	Party	Votes	%
Lyudmila Perkulimova (incumbent)	United Russia	12,880	45.35%
Pyotr Bondarenko	A Just Russia	4,617	16.26%
Pyotr Khlystov	Communist Party	4,613	16.24%
Sergey Bezdenezhnykh	Liberal Democratic Party	3,650	12.85%
Vitaly Pavlov	Independent	1,348	4.75%
Total		28,401	100%

=== 2011 ===
Summary of the 7 August 2011 Kofovsky mayoral election
Candidate	Party	Votes	%
Vadim Golubev	United Russia	555	44.05%
Vitaly Shchegolev	A Just Russia	308	24.44%
Sergey Bezdenezhnykh	Liberal Democratic Party	299	23.73%
Total		1,260	100%

=== 2018 ===
Summary of the 9 September 2018 Khabarovsk mayoral election
Candidate	Party	Votes	%
Sergey Kravchuk	United Russia	54,593	39.97%
Maksim Kukushkin	Communist Party	32,577	23.85%
Sergey Bezdenezhnykh	Liberal Democratic Party	28,498	20.86%
Nikita Mikhalev	A Just Russia	13,586	9.95%
Total		136,599	100%

=== 2019 ===
Summary of the 8 September 2019 Legislative Duma of Khabarovsk Krai election in Topolevsky constituency No.4
Candidate	Party	Votes	%
Sergey Bezdenezhnykh	Liberal Democratic Party	4,455	46.74%
Dmitry Savchenko	United Russia	2,055	21.56%
Vyacheslav Khudyakov	Communist Party	1,264	13.26%
Yevgeny Krotov	Party of Growth	1,084	11.37%
Aleksey Parchuk	A Just Russia – For Truth	279	2.93%
Total		9,531	100%

=== 2024 ===
Summary of the 6–8 September 2024 Legislative Duma of Khabarovsk Krai election in Promyshlenny constituency No.13
Candidate	Party	Votes	%
Konstantin Alyokhin	United Russia	4,234	36.97%
Viktor Lopatin (incumbent)	Liberal Democratic Party	2,196	19.18%
Sergey Bezdenezhnykh	A Just Russia – For Truth	1,519	13.27%
Olga Bessonova	Communists of Russia	1,160	10.13%
Denis Yevseyenko	Communist Party	775	6.77%
Andrey Kruglov	New People	666	5.82%
Total		11,451	100%
