= Yelena Greshnyakova =

Russian politician

- Елена Грешнякова
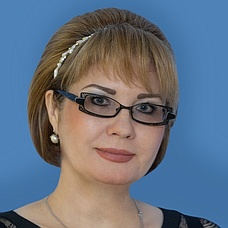

Russian Federation Senator from Khabarovsk Krai
- In office 28 September 2018 – 24 September 2021
- Preceded by: Alexander Shishkin
- Succeeded by: Andrey Bazilevsky

Member of the Legislative Duma of Khabarovsk Krai
- In office 2 October 2014 – 28 September 2018

Personal details
- Born: 24 June 1968 (age 58) Mgachi, Alexandrovsk-Sakhalinsky District, Sakhalin Oblast, Russian SFSR, Soviet Union
- Party: Independent (since 2021)
- Other political affiliations: RPPSS (2021) (Note: participated in 2021 Russian legislative election as the party's candidate but had never been its member); LDPR (2004-2021)
- Spouse: Igor Greshnyakov
- Children: 1
- Education: Far Eastern State Pedagogical Institute

Yelena Gennadyevna Greshnyakova (Russian: Елена Геннадьевна Грешнякова; born 24 June 1968) is a Russian politician who served as a senator from Khabarovsk Krai from 2018 to 2021. Previously, she was a deputy in the Legislative Duma of Khabarovsk Krai.

== Biography ==
=== Early life and career ===
Greshnyakova was born on 24 June 1968 in urban-type settlement Mgachi (Alexandrovsk-Sakhalinsky District, Sakhalin Oblast). She went to Mgachi Middle School and finished it in 1985.

After school graduation, Yelena Greshnyakova studied in Aleksandrovsk-Sakhalinsky Pedagogical College. She graduated from college with honours in 1989 and moved to Bikin, Khabarovsk Krai. She worked as arts and music teacher in Bikin Middle School No.4 in 1989–1994, then in 1994–2000 as coordinator for after-school activity in Bikin Middle School No.6. In 2000 Greshnyakova joined State Special School for Children and Adolescents with Deviant Behaviour as a biology teacher, she later worked as a supplementary education teacher and deputy director for socially educational work until she quit her job as a teacher for a political career in 2009. In 2006 Greshnyakova graduated from Far Eastern State Pedagogical Institute with the speciality of "teacher of the mentally defected".

=== Political career ===
Yelena Greshnyakova joined Liberal Democratic Party of Russia in 2004. In 2006-2009 she was an aide to member of the Legislative Duma of Khabarovsk Krai, simultaneously she served as member of the Khabarovsk Krai Electoral Commission in 2008–2014. Since 2009 Greshnyakova was an aide to State Duma member Sergey Furgal.

In 2010 Yelena Greshnyakova ran for the Khabarovsk Krai Legislative Duma as No.1 in LDPR party list's Southern territorial group and in Southern constituency No.1 (Bikinsky, Vyazemsky and Imeni Lazo districts). In the constituency Greshnyakova placed second (16.67%) to Vice Speaker of the Duma Tatyana Movchan (United Russia, 36.68%).

In 2011 Greshnyakova ran for the Head of Bikinsky District, she lost to incumbent Aleksandr Shvitky (United Russia), winning 31.49% of the vote (Shvitky got 45.42%).

In 2012 Yelena Greshnyakova unsuccessfully ran for Sakhalin Oblast Duma as No.3 in LDPR party list's Territorial group No.8.

In 2014 Yelena Greshnyakova again ran for the Khabarovsk Krai Legislative Duma. This time she was a candidate in Southern constituency No.1 and a No.2 in LDPR party list, only behind party leader Vladimir Zhirinovsky, which almost certainly guaranteed her a mandate (as Zhirinovsky would have given it up). LDPR received 13.34% in Khabarovsk Krai legislative election thus Yelena Greshnyakova was elected to the Khabarovsk Krai Legislative Duma. In Southern constituency Greshnyakova for the second time lost Tatyana Movchan (United Russia, 41.66%), winning 15.38% of the vote.

Yelena Greshnyakova ran for State Duma in 2016 in the Khabarovsk constituency. She placed second with 20.82% of the vote, losing to fellow Khabarovsk Krai Duma member Boris Gladkikh (United Russia, 36.94%).

=== Federation Council ===
For the 2018 gubernatorial election State Duma member Sergey Furgal put Yelena Greshnyakova into his shortlist of candidacies for the Federation Council. After Furgal's unexpected victory in the election he appointed Greshnyakova, who also served as his aide, to the Federation Council on 28 September 2018. She became first female and first LDPR member to represent Khabarovsk Krai in the Federation Council. In the Federation Council Senator Greshnyakova joined the Committee on Science, Education, and Culture. In December 2019 Greshnyakova was also appointed to the Select Commission on Legislative Support of Agroindustrial Complex Technical-Technological Base Development.

In 2019 Yelena Greshnyakova ran for the Khabarovsk Krai Legislative Duma as No.1 in LDPR party list's Northern territorial group. The party won the election in a landslide, but Greshnyakova gave up her seat in Krai Duma and stayed in the Federation Council.

Governor Sergey Furgal was arrested on 9 July 2020 on charges of assassination attempt of his business competitors on 2004–2005. The arrest sparked mass protests in Khabarovsk and other Russian cities. Senator Greshnyakova at the Federation Council session on 15 July spoke about Governor Furgal's arrest, asked "not to rush to conclusions and to respect the presumption of innocence", and publicly called out censorship of the protests in the Russian media. On 9 August Yelena Greshnyakova appeared at the demonstration in Khabarovsk and thanked the protesters for their support of former Governor Furgal (he was fired on 20 July and replaced by acting Governor Mikhail Degtyarev).

Several Telegram channels reported in August 2020 that Yelena Greshnyakova would leave her seat in the Federation Council and run in the by-election to the Khabarovsk Krai Legislative Duma in the Sovetskaya Gavan constituency. The seat was previously held by late Legislative Duma member Vyacheslav Furgal (elder brother of former Governor Sergey Furgal). However, Senator Greshnyakova denied the rumours and said she intended to remain in the Federation Council.

In February 2021 acting Governor Degtyarev was elected coordinator of the LDPR Khabarovsk regional office. A new coordinating council of the regional office was elected but both senators Yelena Greshnyakova and Sergey Bezdenezhnykh were not nominated and lost their position in party's leadership.

In April 2021 Yelena Greshnyakova, her husband and son left Liberal Democratic Party of Russia. Senator Greshnyakova cited the party's "abandonment" of Sergey Furgal and various conflicts in the Khabarovsk regional office as the main reasons for her departure. LDPR Khabarovsk regional office called Greshnyakova a "traitor", Vice Speaker of the State Duma Igor Lebedev (son of LDPR leader Vladimir Zhirinovsky) condemned the move and demanded Greshnyakova to resign from the Federation Council.

Yelena Greshnyakova was considered a possible challenger to acting Governor Mikhail Degtyarev in the upcoming gubernatorial election. However, she declined due to lack of political parties ready to support her (only political parties are allowed to nominate candidates for governor in Khabarovsk Krai). Instead, Greshnyakova ran for State Duma in the concurrent election, heading the Party of Pensioners party list in the Far Eastern territorial group. In the election Party of Pensioners won only 2.45% and failed to cross a 5% threshold to enter State Duma.

In September 2021 Senator Greshnyakova filed a suit against Vladimir Zhirinovsky after the latter claimed that Yelena Greshnyakova misused the funds given for Furgal's lawyers.

On 24 September 2021 Greshnyakova's term in the Federation Council ended as Khabarovsk Krai Governor Mikhail Degtyarev appointed his deputy Andrey Bazilevsky as the next Senator from Khabarovsk Krai. Yelena Greshnyakova claimed she received a job offer from the Party of Pensioners.

== Personal life ==
Yelena Greshnyakova is married to Igor Greshnyakov and they have a son.

In May–December 2018 Greshnyakova was director of the Centre of Spiritual and Moral Eastern Orthodox Upbringing "Russian Classical School". Yelena Greshnyakova was also a co-owner of film company "Amurfilm" in 2017–2018, the other co-owner was LDPR coordinator in the Jewish Autonomous Oblast and now-State Duma member (elected in 2019) Ivan Pilyaev who is also rumoured to be Sergey Furgal's son-in-law.

== Honours ==
- Ministry of Defence medal "For the participation in Victory Day military parade" (2020)
