= 2024 Khabarovsk Krai Legislative Duma election =

Regional election in Khabarovsk Krai, Russia

- 6–8 September 2024

All 36 seats in the Legislative Duma 19 seats needed for a majority
- Turnout: 32.83% ▼1.98 pp
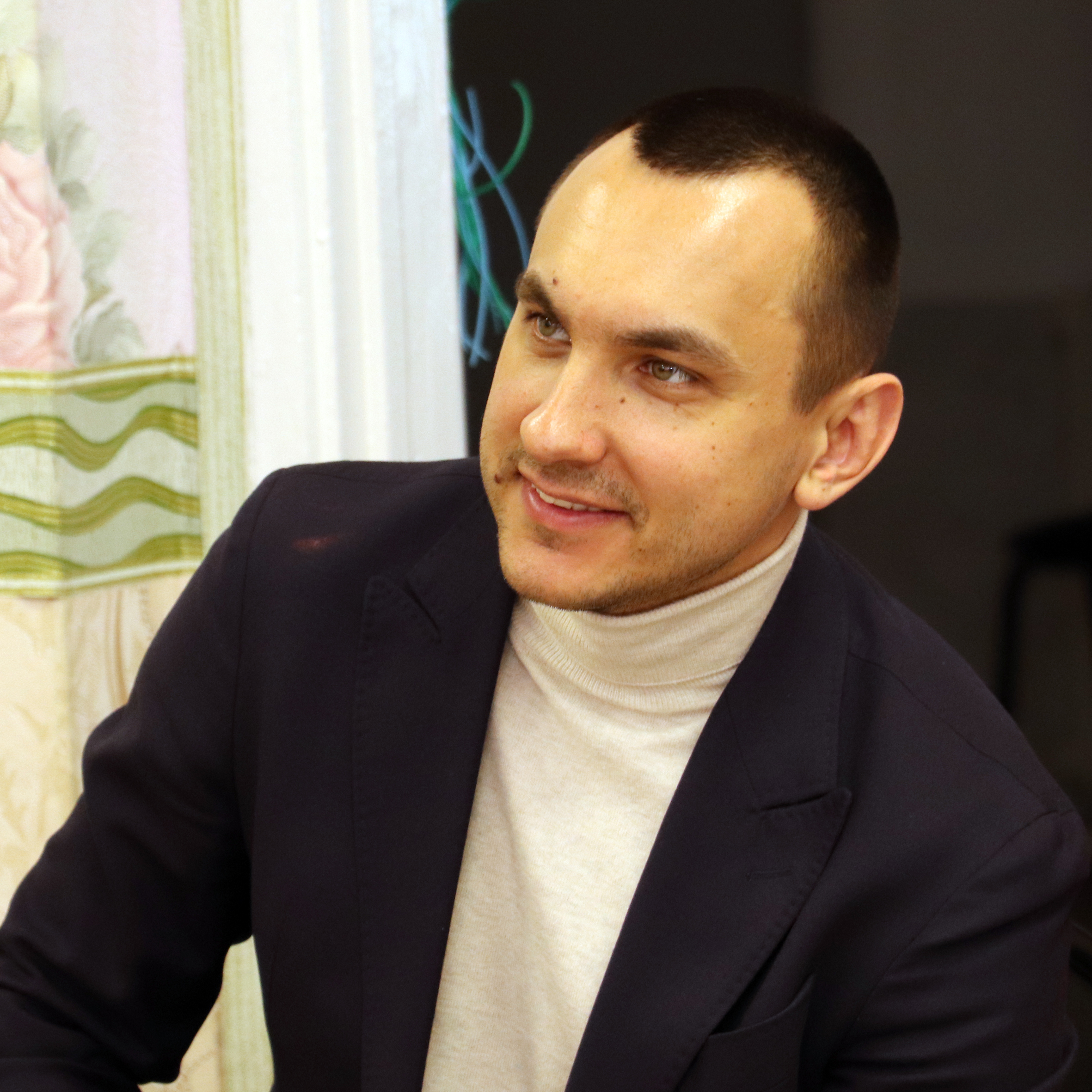

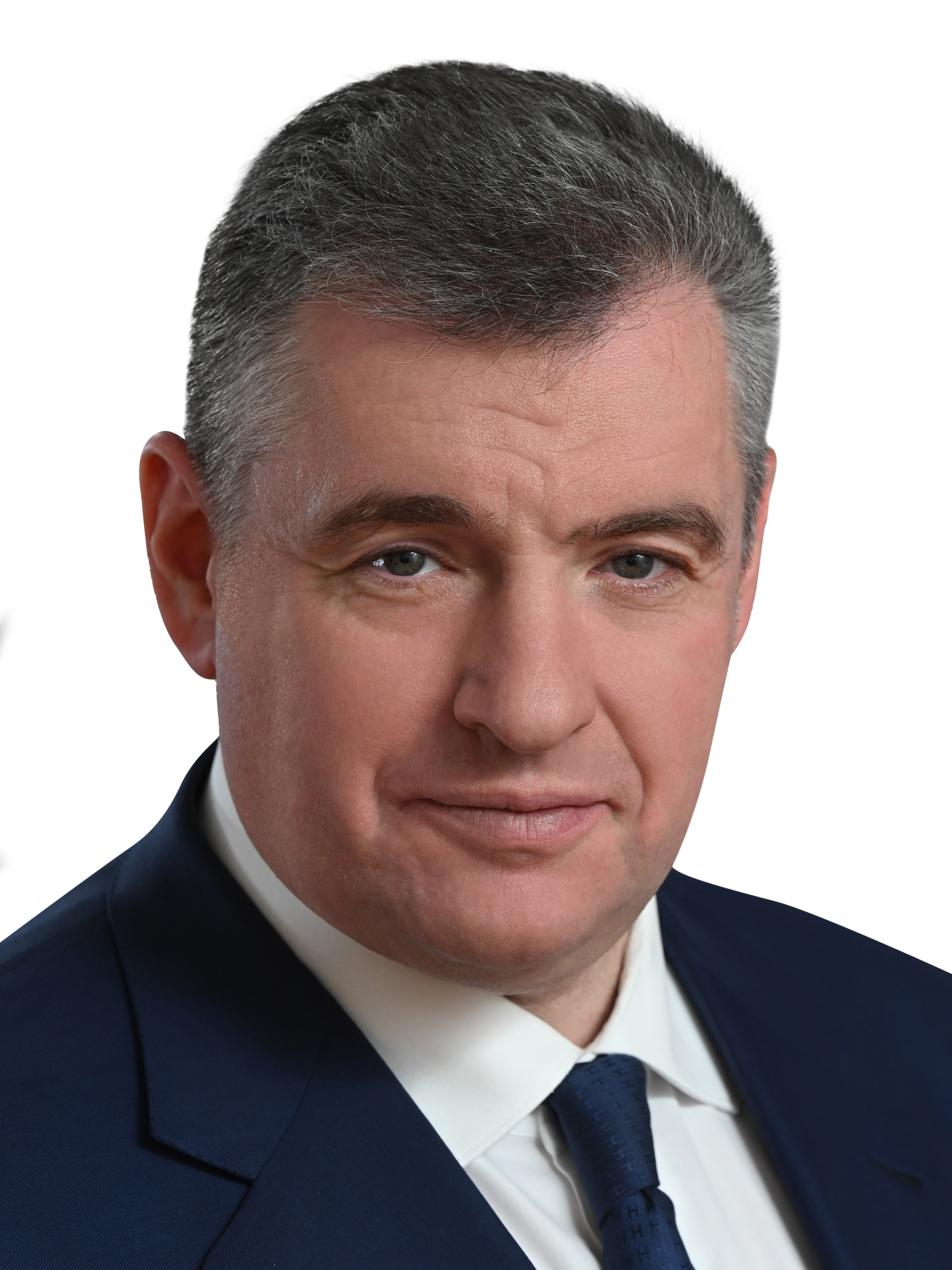

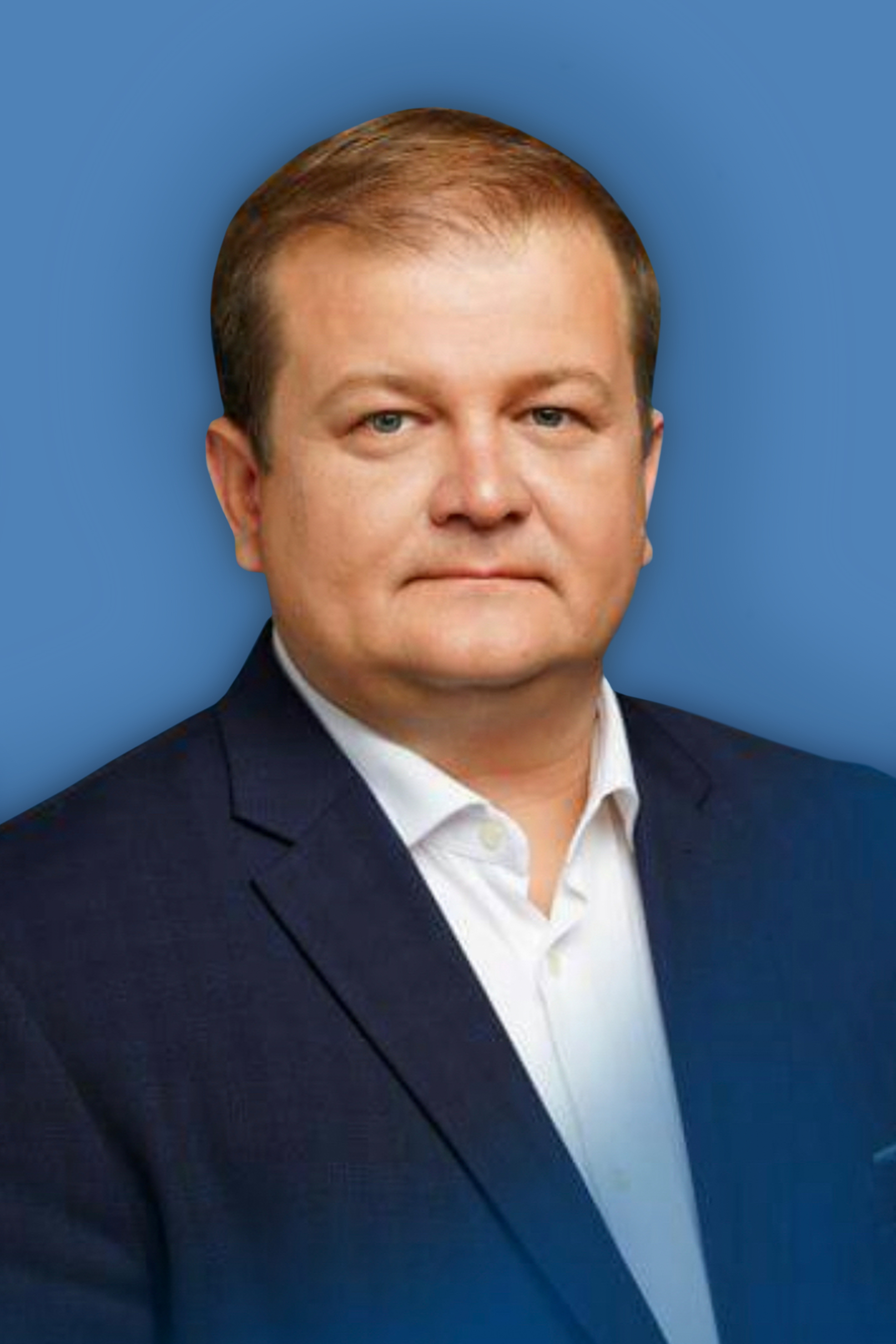

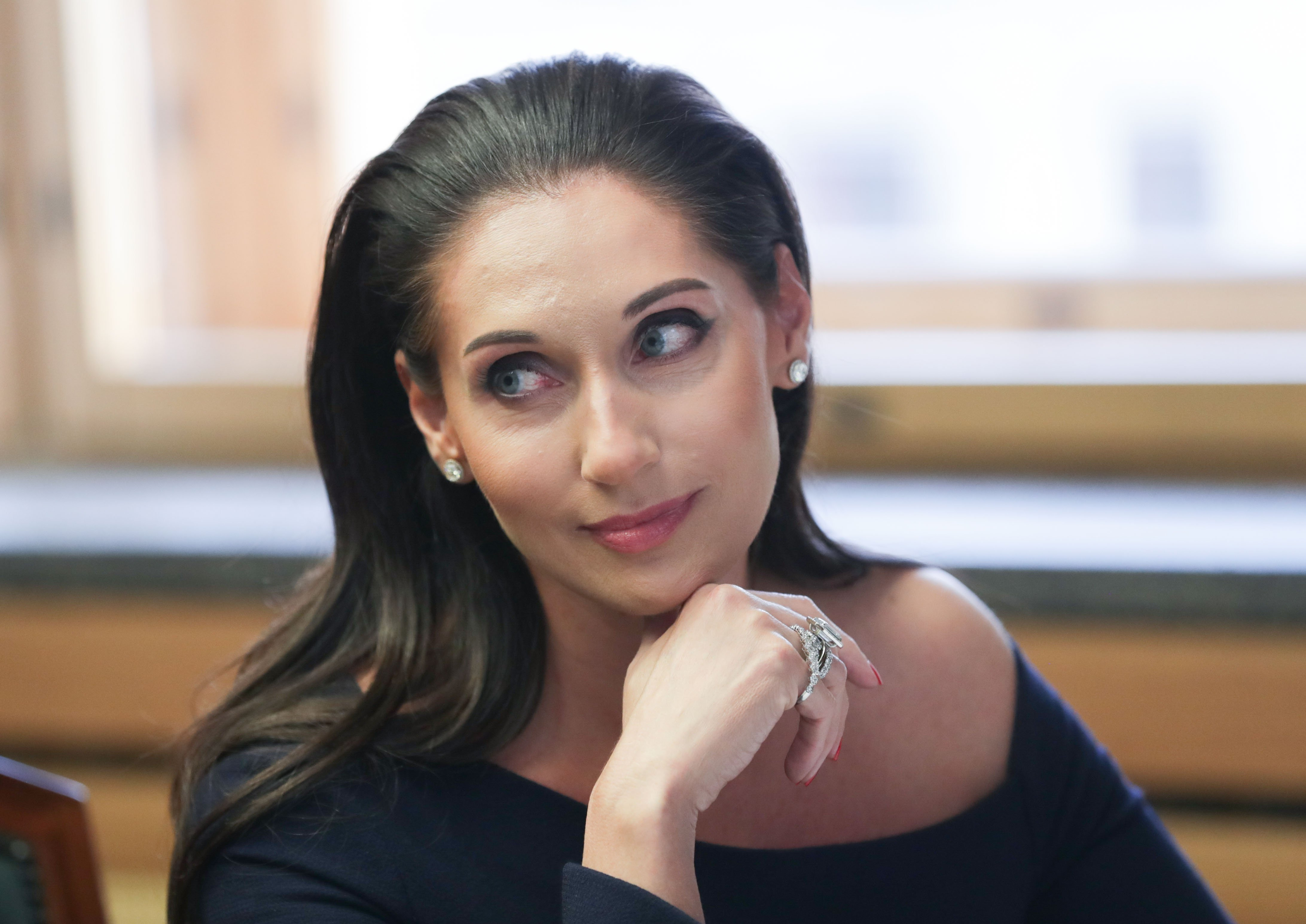
	Majority party	Minority party	Third party
			CPRF
Candidate	Maksim Ivanov	Leonid Slutsky	Pyotr Perevezentsev
Party	United Russia	LDPR	CPRF
Last election	12.51%, 2 seats	56.12%, 30 seats	17.24%, 3 seats
Seats won	28	5	1
Seat change	▲26	▼25	▼2
Popular vote	144,061	52,528	39,493
Percentage	45.93%	16.75%	12.59%
Swing	▲33.42 pp	▼39.37 pp	▼4.65 pp
	Fourth party	Fifth party	Sixth party
			RPPSS
Candidate	Sergey Bezdenezhnykh	Roza Chemeris	Anatoly Nasyrov
Party	SR-ZP	New People	RPPSS
Last election	3.53%, 0 seats	Did not exist	Did not participate
Seats won	1	1	0
Seat change	▲1	Did not exist	Did not participate
Popular vote	22,969	16,775	12,758
Percentage	7.32%	5.35%	4.07%
Swing	▲3.79 pp	Did not exist	Did not participate
- Results by municipalities (left) and single-mandate constituencies (right)
Chairwoman before election
Irina Zikunova
Independent
Elected Chairman
Nikolay Shevtsov
United Russia

The 2024 Legislative Duma of Khabarovsk Krai election took place on 6–8 September 2024, on common election day, coinciding with 2024 Khabarovsk Krai gubernatorial election. All 36 seats in the Legislative Duma were up for reelection.

United Russia was able to win a convincing majority in the Legislative Duma with 46% of the vote, flipping it from Liberal Democratic Party of Russia, which shockingly won the last election on the popularity of then-Governor Sergey Furgal. A Just Russia – For Truth, led by Furgal's supporters, and New People entered the Duma.

== Electoral system ==
Under current election laws, the Legislative Duma is elected for a term of five years, with parallel voting. 12 seats are elected by party-list proportional representation with a 5% electoral threshold, with the other half elected in 24 single-member constituencies by first-past-the-post voting. Seats in the proportional part are allocated using the Imperiali quota, modified to ensure that every party list, which passes the threshold, receives at least one mandate.

== Candidates ==
=== Party lists ===
To register regional lists of candidates, parties need to collect 0.5% of signatures of all registered voters in Khabarovsk Krai.

The following parties were relieved from the necessity to collect signatures:

- United Russia
- Communist Party of the Russian Federation
- A Just Russia — Patriots — For Truth
- Liberal Democratic Party of Russia
- New People
- Communists of Russia

No.	Party	Krai-wide list	Candidates	Territorial groups	Status
1	United Russia	Maksim Ivanov • Alyona Chaplygina • Nikolay Shevtsov • Viktor Kalashnikov • Nikolay Antonov	44	12	Registered
2	Communist Party	Pyotr Perevezentsev • Konstantin Kibirev • Pavel Maltsev • Denis Yevseyenko • Aleksandr Tsupko	47	12	Registered
3	A Just Russia – For Truth	Sergey Bezdenezhnykh • Mikhail Sidorov	54	12	Registered
4	New People	Roza Chemeris • Yury Kondratchik • Sergey Zyryanov • Yegor Nevidimov	47	12	Registered
5	Communists of Russia	Vladimir Titorenko • Yaroslav Sidorov • Aleksey Fedorov • Irina Titorenko • Ilya Kleymyonov	64	12	Registered
6	Party of Pensioners	Anatoly Nasyrov • Pavel Mysin • Svetlana Melnikova • Sergey Kravtsov • Marina Russkaya	51	12	Registered
7	Liberal Democratic Party	Leonid Slutsky • Sergey Zyubr • Ivan Rybin • Aleksandr Zhornik • Olga Ushakova	60	12	Registered
8	Rodina	Vladimir Prikhodko	30	10	Registered
	Civic Platform	Sergey Golovkin	36	12	Failed to qualify

New People and Russian Party of Pensioners for Social Justice took part in Khabarovsk Krai legislative election for the first time, while Party of Growth, who participated in the last election, has been at the time in the process of merging with New People.

=== Single-mandate constituencies ===
24 single-mandate constituencies were formed in Khabarovsk Krai. To register candidates in single-mandate constituencies need to collect 3% of signatures of registered voters in the constituency.

Number of candidates in single-mandate constituencies
Party	Candidates	
Party	Nominated	Registered
Liberal Democratic Party	22	22
Communist Party	23	22
United Russia	24	23
A Just Russia – For Truth	24	21
Communists of Russia	14	10
New People	16	15
Independent	2	1
Total	125	114

== Results ==
=== Results by party lists ===
Summary of the 6–8 September 2024 Legislative Duma of Khabarovsk Krai election results
Party	Party list					Constituency		Total	
Party	Votes	%	±pp	Seats	+/–	Seats	+/–	Seats	+/–
United Russia	144,061	45.93	▲33.42	7	▲5	21	▲21	28	▲26
Liberal Democratic Party	52,528	16.75	▼39.37	2	▼6	3	▼19	5	▼25
Communist Party	39,493	12.59	▼4.65	1	▼1	0	▼1	1	▼2
A Just Russia — For Truth	22,969	7.32	▲3.79	1	▲1	0	Steady	1	▲1
New People	16,775	5.35	New	1	New	0	New	1	New
Party of Pensioners	12,758	4.07	New	0	New	–	–	0	New
Communists of Russia	6,293	2.01	▼1.42	0	Steady	0	New	0	Steady
Rodina	2,778	0.89	▼0.80	0	Steady	–	–	0	Steady
Independents	–	–	–	–	–	0	▼1	0	▼1
Invalid ballots	15,986	5.10	▲1.36	—	—	—	—	—	—
Total	313,642	100.00	—	12	Steady	24	Steady	36	Steady
Turnout	313,642	32.83	▼1.98	—	—	—	—	—	—
Registered voters	955,304	100.00	—	—	—	—	—	—	—

Former Chief Federal Inspector Nikolay Shevtsov (United Russia / Independent) was elected Chairman of the Legislative Duma, replacing retiring incumbent Irina Zikunova (Independent). Former Deputy Chairman of the Government of Khabarovsk Krai Viktor Kalashnikov (United Russia) was appointed to the Federation Council, replacing incumbent Senator Sergey Bezdenezhnykh (SR–ZP).

=== Results in single-member constituencies ===
==== District 1 ====
Summary of the 6–8 September 2024 Legislative Duma of Khabarovsk Krai election in Yuzhny constituency No.1
Candidate	Party	Votes	%
Olga Olkhovaya	United Russia	4,013	37.45%
Aleksandr Zakharov	A Just Russia – For Truth	2,197	20.50%
Sergey Poteshkin	Communist Party	1,981	18.49%
Kirill Tsmakalov (incumbent)	Liberal Democratic Party	1,868	17.43%
Total		10,716	100%

==== District 2 ====
Summary of the 6–8 September 2024 Legislative Duma of Khabarovsk Krai election in Lazovsky constituency No.2
Candidate	Party	Votes	%
Valentina Korolenko	United Russia	4,493	38.44%
Yury Kuchinsky	Liberal Democratic Party	2,680	22.93%
Oleg Sivolonsky	Communist Party	1,828	15.64%
Andrey Rabarsky	A Just Russia – For Truth	1,788	15.30%
Total		11,688	100%

==== District 3 ====
Summary of the 6–8 September 2024 Legislative Duma of Khabarovsk Krai election in Khabarovsky constituency No.3
Candidate	Party	Votes	%
Yevgeny Solonenko	United Russia	6,286	48.78%
Irina Belashova	Independent	1,798	13.95%
Yevgeny Lopatin	Communist Party	1,356	10.52%
Natalya Belozor	New People	1,237	9.60%
Yevgeny Chikalyov	A Just Russia – For Truth	785	6.09%
Mikhail Chashkin	Communists of Russia	645	5.01%
Total		12,887	100%

==== District 4 ====
Summary of the 6–8 September 2024 Legislative Duma of Khabarovsk Krai election in Topolevsky constituency No.4
Candidate	Party	Votes	%
Aleksandr Yats	United Russia	3,943	45.69%
Irina Regulyarnaya	Liberal Democratic Party	1,553	18.00%
Arsen Klychev	A Just Russia – For Truth	1,127	13.06%
Oleg Kobelev	Communist Party	856	9.92%
Vladimir Neshkhlebov	New People	676	7.83%
Total		8,629	100%

==== District 5 ====
Summary of the 6–8 September 2024 Legislative Duma of Khabarovsk Krai election in Zheleznodorozhny constituency No.5
Candidate	Party	Votes	%
Vladimir Burovtsev	United Russia	4,316	35.47%
Olga Ushakova (incumbent)	Liberal Democratic Party	2,710	22.27%
Denis Kuratov	A Just Russia – For Truth	1,214	9.98%
Pavel Zozin	New People	1,168	9.60%
Pelageya Stadnik	Communist Party	987	8.11%
Aleksandr Pismenov	Communists of Russia	795	6.53%
Total		12,168	100%

==== District 6 ====
Summary of the 6–8 September 2024 Legislative Duma of Khabarovsk Krai election in Transportny constituency No.6
Candidate	Party	Votes	%
Andrey Subbotin	United Russia	4,583	37.74%
Mikhail Sidorov	A Just Russia – For Truth	2,470	20.34%
Sergey Zyubr	Liberal Democratic Party	1,720	14.16%
Mikhail Kurbanov	Communist Party	1,108	9.12%
Gleb Sugak	New People	707	5.82%
Vladimir Titorenko	Communists of Russia	654	5.39%
Total		12,144	100%

==== District 7 ====
Summary of the 6–8 September 2024 Legislative Duma of Khabarovsk Krai election in Magistralny constituency No.7
Candidate	Party	Votes	%
Aleksandr Fedchishin	United Russia	4,029	33.51%
Oksana Podkorytova	A Just Russia – For Truth	2,728	22.69%
Andrey Skomorokhin	Communist Party	1,710	14.22%
Pavel Tupchenko	Liberal Democratic Party	1,317	10.95%
Maksim Nikiforov	New People	1,224	10.18%
Total		12,024	100%

==== District 8 ====
Summary of the 6–8 September 2024 Legislative Duma of Khabarovsk Krai election in Krasnoflotsky constituency No.8
Candidate	Party	Votes	%
Dmitry Voronin	United Russia	5,140	39.26%
Sergey Ilyin	Communist Party	1,962	14.99%
Igor Plotnikov	Liberal Democratic Party	1,663	12.70%
Vasily Kharitonov	A Just Russia – For Truth	1,575	12.03%
Yegor Nevidimov	New People	1,130	8.63%
Aleksey Syryev	Communists of Russia	619	4.73%
Total		13,091	100%

==== District 9 ====
Summary of the 6–8 September 2024 Legislative Duma of Khabarovsk Krai election in Kirovsky constituency No.9
Candidate	Party	Votes	%
Sergey Galitsyn	United Russia	5,514	45.24%
Oleg Movchan	Communist Party	2,149	17.63%
Yevgeny Pletnyov	Liberal Democratic Party	1,833	15.04%
Veniamin Stelmakh	New People	1,566	12.85%
Total		12,187	100%

==== District 10 ====
Summary of the 6–8 September 2024 Legislative Duma of Khabarovsk Krai election in Tsentralny constituency No.10
Candidate	Party	Votes	%
Olga Bulkova	United Russia	6,487	46.26%
Maksim Kukushkin	A Just Russia – For Truth	2,672	19.06%
Aleksandr Chuprov	Communist Party	2,058	14.68%
Mari Shelukhanova	Liberal Democratic Party	1,298	9.26%
Dmitry Fasakhov	Communists of Russia	704	5.02%
Total		14,022	100%

==== District 11 ====
Summary of the 6–8 September 2024 Legislative Duma of Khabarovsk Krai election in Pionersky constituency No.11
Candidate	Party	Votes	%
Vsevolod Mokhirev	United Russia	6,062	40.13%
Vladislav Chechikov (incumbent)	Liberal Democratic Party	3,144	20.81%
Konstantin Kibirev	Communist Party	2,925	19.36%
Andrey Zangiyev	New People	1,933	12.80%
Total		15,107	100%

==== District 12 ====
Summary of the 6–8 September 2024 Legislative Duma of Khabarovsk Krai election in Industrialny constituency No.12
Candidate	Party	Votes	%
Konstantin Yurov	United Russia	6,383	46.84%
Natalya Zhiryakova	A Just Russia – For Truth	2,464	18.08%
Aleksandr Detenyuk	Communist Party	2,236	16.41%
Ksenia Agiyevich	New People	1,500	11.01%
Total		13,626	100%

==== District 13 ====
Summary of the 6–8 September 2024 Legislative Duma of Khabarovsk Krai election in Promyshlenny constituency No.13
Candidate	Party	Votes	%
Konstantin Alyokhin	United Russia	4,234	36.97%
Viktor Lopatin (incumbent)	Liberal Democratic Party	2,196	19.18%
Sergey Bezdenezhnykh	A Just Russia – For Truth	1,519	13.27%
Olga Bessonova	Communists of Russia	1,160	10.13%
Denis Yevseyenko	Communist Party	775	6.77%
Andrey Kruglov	New People	666	5.82%
Total		11,451	100%

==== District 14 ====
Summary of the 6–8 September 2024 Legislative Duma of Khabarovsk Krai election in Krasnorechensky constituency No.14
Candidate	Party	Votes	%
Gennady Maltsev	United Russia	5,423	45.18%
Yulia Lekhan	A Just Russia – For Truth	3,631	30.25%
Andrey Tsmakalov	Liberal Democratic Party	1,839	15.32%
Total		12,003	100%

==== District 15 ====
Summary of the 6–8 September 2024 Legislative Duma of Khabarovsk Krai election in Sovetsko-Gavansky constituency No.15
Candidate	Party	Votes	%
Anatoly Litvinchuk	United Russia	5,435	38.16%
Tatyana Barinova	Communist Party	2,932	20.58%
Olga Glebova	A Just Russia – For Truth	2,684	18.84%
Pavel Kraynikov	Liberal Democratic Party	2,183	15.33%
Total		14,244	100%

==== District 16 ====
Summary of the 6–8 September 2024 Legislative Duma of Khabarovsk Krai election in Komsomolsky constituency No.16
Candidate	Party	Votes	%
Viktor Kalashnikov	United Russia	10,313	58.37%
Aleksandr Muravets	Liberal Democratic Party	2,490	14.09%
Elvira Kiseleva	Communists of Russia	2,109	11.94%
Ilya Mukletsov	Communist Party	1,631	9.23%
Total		17,669	100%

==== District 17 ====
Summary of the 6–8 September 2024 Legislative Duma of Khabarovsk Krai election in Aviastroitelny constituency No.17
Candidate	Party	Votes	%
Sergey Bocharov	United Russia	6,162	47.79%
Aleksandr Antonochev	Communist Party	2,141	16.60%
Yelizaveta Shalagina	Liberal Democratic Party	2,015	15.63%
Aleksey Malya	A Just Russia – For Truth	1,419	11.01%
Total		12,894	100%

==== District 18 ====
Summary of the 6–8 September 2024 Legislative Duma of Khabarovsk Krai election in Silinsky constituency No.18
Candidate	Party	Votes	%
Ruslan Batyu	Liberal Democratic Party	3,552	31.99%
Anastasia Chugunova	United Russia	2,255	20.31%
Andrey Zhila	Communist Party	2,044	18.41%
Yelena Papulova	A Just Russia – For Truth	1,370	12.34%
Sergey Zyryanov	New People	814	7.33%
Total		11,104	100%

==== District 19 ====
Summary of the 6–8 September 2024 Legislative Duma of Khabarovsk Krai election in Sudostroitelny constituency No.19
Candidate	Party	Votes	%
Yury Lysenkov	United Russia	4,599	38.18%
Pavel Golnikov	Liberal Democratic Party	2,600	21.58%
Aleksey Khromenko	A Just Russia – For Truth	1,450	12.04%
Aleksandr Tsupko	Communist Party	1,277	10.60%
Vasily Shatilov	New People	1,024	8.50%
Total		12,046	100%

==== District 20 ====
Summary of the 6–8 September 2024 Legislative Duma of Khabarovsk Krai election in Pribrezhny constituency No.20
Candidate	Party	Votes	%
Konstantin Yefimov	United Russia	3,460	31.52%
Olga Dyatala	Liberal Democratic Party	2,143	19.52%
Nadezhda Veremyeva	A Just Russia – For Truth	1,744	15.89%
Valery Chebargin	Communist Party	1,238	11.28%
Larisa Zvinyatskaya	Communists of Russia	1,228	11.19%
Total		10,978	100%

==== District 21 ====
Summary of the 6–8 September 2024 Legislative Duma of Khabarovsk Krai election in Molodyozhny constituency No.21
Candidate	Party	Votes	%
Aleksandr Zhornik	Liberal Democratic Party	2,714	26.72%
Yelena Drozdova	Communist Party	2,044	20.13%
Yulia Silakova	A Just Russia – For Truth	1,892	18.63%
Oleg Filimonov	Communists of Russia	1,376	13.55%
Igor Pavlov	New People	985	9.70%
Total		10,156	100%

==== District 22 ====
Summary of the 6–8 September 2024 Legislative Duma of Khabarovsk Krai election in Solnechny constituency No.22
Candidate	Party	Votes	%
Sergey Fomichev	United Russia	5,071	39.44%
Aleksandr Brusko (incumbent)	Liberal Democratic Party	4,516	35.13%
Aleksey Babayev	Communists of Russia	1,169	9.09%
Viktor Kvachenko	New People	768	5.97%
Aleksey Belomestnov	A Just Russia – For Truth	687	5.34%
Total		12,856	100%

==== District 23 ====
Summary of the 6–8 September 2024 Legislative Duma of Khabarovsk Krai election in Amursky constituency No.23
Candidate	Party	Votes	%
Valery Postelnik	United Russia	5,020	35.32%
Andrey Shvetsov	Communist Party	3,155	22.20%
Yekaterina Golubeva	Liberal Democratic Party	2,623	18.45%
Artyom Skvortsov	A Just Russia – For Truth	2,475	17.41%
Total		14,213	100%

==== District 24 ====
Summary of the 6–8 September 2024 Legislative Duma of Khabarovsk Krai election in Severny constituency No.24
Candidate	Party	Votes	%
Gagik Avagimyan (incumbent)	Liberal Democratic Party	3,018	26.11%
Olga Onokhova	United Russia	2,474	21.41%
Yury Zhekotov	Communist Party	2,255	19.51%
Mikhail Kravchenko	New People	1,648	14.26%
Sergey Ushakov	A Just Russia – For Truth	1,241	10.74%
Total		11,557	100%

=== Members ===
Incumbent deputies are highlighted with bold, elected members who declined to take a seat are marked with ~~strikethrough~~.

Constituency
No.	Member	Party
1	Olga Olkhovaya	United Russia
2	Valentina Korolenko	United Russia
3	Yevgeny Solonenko	United Russia
4	Aleksandr Yats	United Russia
5	Vladimir Burovtsev	United Russia
6	Andrey Subbotin	United Russia
7	Aleksandr Fedchishin	United Russia
8	Dmitry Voronin	United Russia
9	Sergey Galitsyn	United Russia
10	Olga Bulkova	United Russia
11	Vsevolod Mokhirev	United Russia
12	Konstantin Yurov	United Russia
13	Konstantin Alyokhin	United Russia
14	Gennady Maltsev	United Russia
15	Anatoly Litvinchuk	United Russia
16	Viktor Kalashnikov	United Russia
17	Sergey Bocharov	United Russia
18	Ruslan Batyu	Liberal Democratic Party
19	Yury Lysenkov	United Russia
20	Konstantin Yefimov	United Russia
21	Aleksandr Zhornik	Liberal Democratic Party
22	Sergey Fomichev	United Russia
23	Valery Postelnik	United Russia
24	Gagik Avagimyan	Liberal Democratic Party

Party lists
Member	Party
~~Maksim Ivanov~~	United Russia
~~Alyona Chaplygina~~	United Russia
Nikolay Shevtsov	United Russia
Nikolay Antonov	United Russia
~~Dmitry Savchenko~~	United Russia
~~Andrey Dubkov~~	United Russia
~~Dmitry Zavaruyev~~	United Russia
Konstantin Kovalchuk	United Russia
~~Andrey Beloglazov~~	United Russia
Vladimir Sidorov	United Russia
Mikhail Kolochko	United Russia
~~Sergey Nagornyak~~	United Russia
~~Pavel Borovlev~~	United Russia
Larisa Lisova	United Russia
~~Igor Kasatkin~~	United Russia
Vadim Gorulenko	United Russia
~~Leonid Slutsky~~	Liberal Democratic Party
Sergey Zyubr	Liberal Democratic Party
Ivan Rybin	Liberal Democratic Party
~~Pyotr Perevezentsev~~	Communist Party
Konstantin Kibirev	Communist Party
Sergey Bezdenezhnykh	A Just Russia – For Truth
~~Roza Chemeris~~	New People
Yury Kondratchik	New People

== See also ==
- 2024 Russian elections
