= Dmitry Priyatnov =

Russian politician

- Дмитрий Приятнов

Member of Federation Council
- In office 23 October 2019 – 31 October 2019
- Preceded by: Viktor Ozerov
- Succeeded by: Sergey Bezdenezhnykh
- Constituency: Khabarovsk Krai

Personal details
- Born: 27 July 1978 (age 47) Xovos, Uzbek SFSR, Soviet Union
- Party: Liberal Democratic Party of Russia

Dmitry Stanislavovich Priyatnov (Russian: Дмитрий Станиславович Приятнов; born 27 July 1978), is an Uzbek-born Russian politician who briefly served as a member of the Federation Council, representing the legislative authority of Khabarovsk Krai in 2019. He holds the distinction of being the shortest-serving senator in the history of the Federation Council, having served for only one week.

== Biography ==
Priaytnov was born in Khavast, in the Syrdarya region of Uzbekistan.

He graduated from the Far Eastern State University of Transport and subsequently worked at the Far Eastern branch of LocoTech-Service LLC as deputy head of the Amurskoye service locomotive depot in Komsomolsk-on-Amur. Following the regional elections held on 8 September 2019, Priyatnov was elected to the Legislative Duma of Khabarovsk Krai as a member of the Liberal Democratic Party of Russia (LDPR).

On 23 October 2019, he was elected to the Federation Council as the representative of the legislative authority of Khabarovsk Krai, receiving 32 votes in favor and two against. According to the website of the regional election commission, Priyatnov had an expunged criminal record under Part 1 of Article 327 of the Criminal Code of the Russian Federation: "Forgery, production, or circulation of counterfeit documents, state awards, stamps, seals, or forms." Following his election to the Federation Council, Priyatnov immediately resigned from his position as deputy in the regional Duma.

On 24 October, Gennady Nakushnov, chairman of the Khabarovsk Election Commission, explained that the initial background check was conducted using data from the Information Center of the Ministry of Internal Affairs for the Khabarovsk Territory, which only verified records based on the candidate's place of birth, residence, and employment. The Central Election Commission, however, conducted a more comprehensive check using the all-Russian database. According to Nakushnov, Priyatnov had previously purchased a car with documents that had been altered, but he had never appeared in court and was unaware of his criminal record. On 31 October 2019, Priyatnov resigned from the Federation Council.

Vyacheslav Timchenko, head of the Federation Council Committee on Rules and Organization of Parliamentary Activities, stated that since the Federation Council had not yet received the official documents confirming Priyatnov's election, a formal procedure to terminate his powers was not necessary. Nevertheless, on 25 November 2019, the Federation Council officially terminated Priyatnov's mandate retroactively from 31 October, following his request.

According to Nakushnov, "the lie of one person led to the discrediting of the Khabarovsk Territory election commission and the LDPR branch."
