= Alexander Shishkin (politician) =

Russian politician (born 1960)

- Александр Шишкин
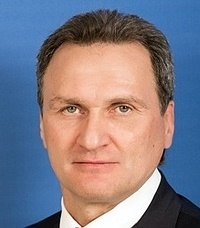

Senator from Khabarovsk Krai
- In office 18 September 2013 – 28 September 2018
- Preceded by: Yury Solonin
- Succeeded by: Yelena Greshnyakova

Personal details
- Born: Alexander Shishkin; 4 May 1960 (age 66) Osinniki, Russian SFSR, Soviet Union
- Education: Kemerovo Technological Institute of Food Industry, KemSU

Alexander Gennadievich Shishkin (Russian: Александр Геннадьевич Шишкин; born 4 May 1960) is a Russian politician who served as a senator from Khabarovsk Krai from 2013 to 2018.

== Career ==
Alexander Shishkin was born on 4 May 1960 in Osinniki. He graduated from the Kemerovo Technological Institute of Food Industry. Later he was the deputy of the State Duma of the 6th convocation. From September 2013 to September 2018, Shishkin represented Khabarovsk Krai in the Federation Council.

He is under sanctions introduced by Ukraine for approving the annexation of Crimea.
