= Viktor Ozerov =

Russian politician (born 1958)

- Виктор Озеров
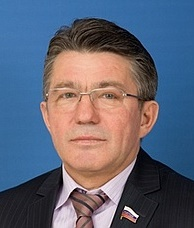

Russian Federation Senator from Khabarovsk Krai
- In office 15 December 2001 – 23 October 2019
- Succeeded by: Dmitry Priyatnov

Chairman of the Legislative Duma of Khabarovsk Krai
- In office 31 March 1994 – 9 December 2001
- Preceded by: Office established
- Succeeded by: Yury Onopriyenko

Personal details
- Born: 5 January 1958 (age 68) Abakan, Russian SFSR, Soviet Union
- Party: United Russia

Viktor Alekseyevich Ozerov (Russian: Виктор Алексеевич Озеров; 5 January 1958) is a Russian statesman and former army officer who served as member of the Federation Council from 1996 to 2019, and a chairman of the Federation Council Committee on Security and Defense from 2001 until 2017.

== Biography ==
Viktor Ozerov was born on 5 January 1958.

In 1979, he graduated from the Novosibirsk Higher Military-Political School named after the 60th anniversary of the Great October Revolution. He served as deputy company commander for political affairs, deputy commander for political affairs of a separate battalion in the Southern Group of Forces based in Budapest, and a deputy commander of a training battalion for political affairs in the Carpathian Military District.

From 1989 to 1991, after graduating from the Lenin Military-Political Academy, he served as deputy commander of a military unit for political affairs in the Far Eastern Military District in Vyazemsky.

From 1991 to 1994, he was the Chairman of the Vyazemsky District Council.

On 31 March 1994, Ozerov was elected a member of parliament, a deputy of the Khabarovsk Krai Duma of the first convocation, and became the chairman of the Khabarovsk Krai Duma until 2001. In January 1996, Ozerov became a member of the Federation Council. In 2001, a was proclaimed a representative in the Federation Council from the legislative authority of the Khabarovsk Krai. He was a Chairman of the Russian Federation Council Committee on Security and Defense in from 2001 to 2017. Since November 2019, he has been appointed advisor to the head of the Russian Social and Political Center Foundation (ROSPOLITIKA).

=== Military service ===
He was last ranked a colonel, when he left the army in 1991.

=== Education ===
He is a candidate of Legal Sciences.

== Sanctions ==
On March 17, 2014, he was subject to sanctions by all EU countries for publicly supporting the deployment of Russian troops in Ukraine in the Federation Council. On March 20, he was subject to US sanctions.

Also on the sanctions lists of Canada, Australia, Ukraine and Switzerland.

== Family ==
He is married has a son and a daughter. His daughter, Marina, is the deputy Head of the Organizational Directorate and the Head of the Department of the Office of the Federation Council.
