= 2020–2021 Khabarovsk Krai protests =

Series of protests in the Russian Far East starting in July 2020

- Part of the 2020 Russian protests
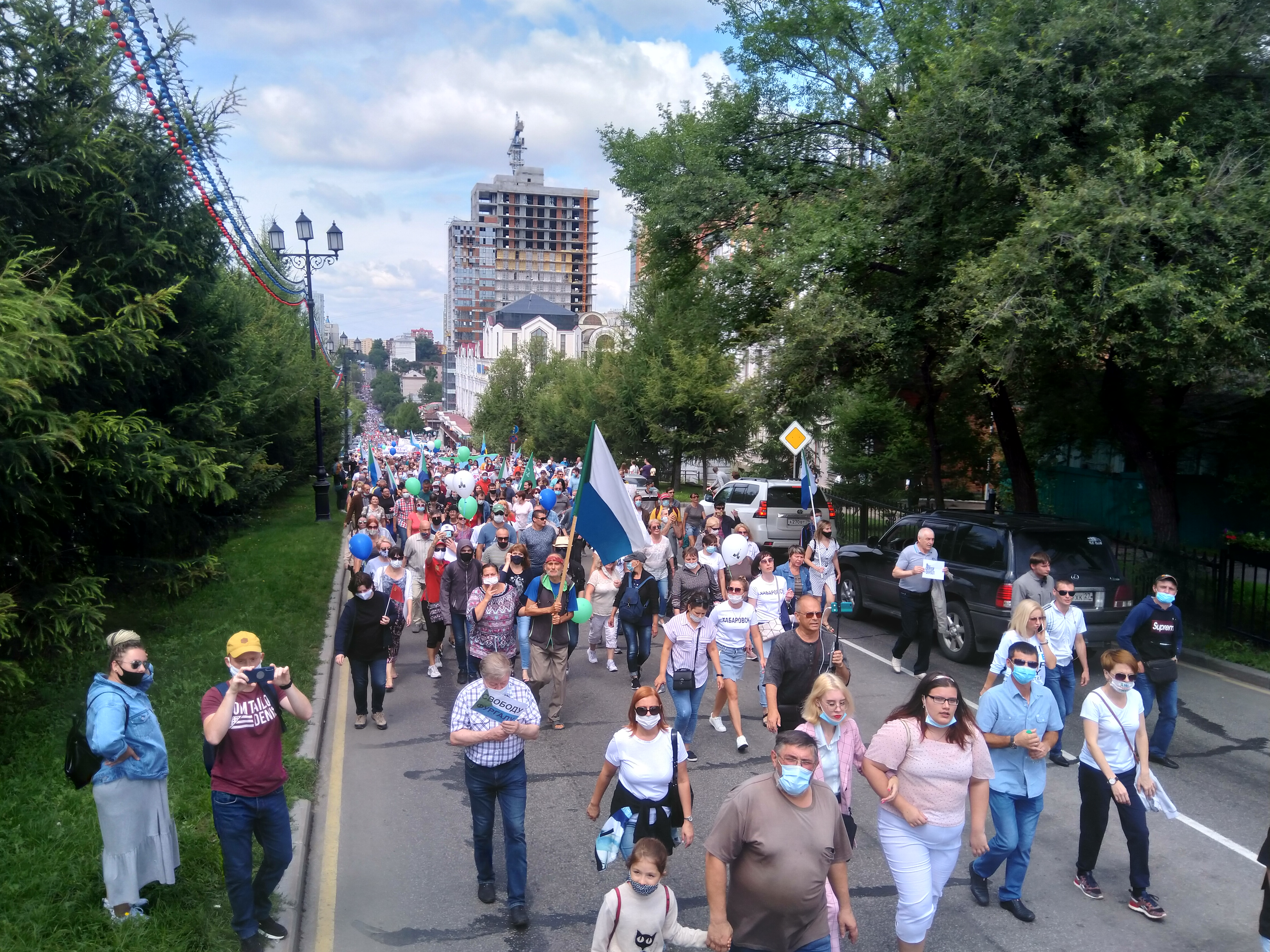
- Demonstration in Khabarovsk on 8 August 2020
- Date: 11 July 2020 – 23 January 2021
- Location: Russia: Khabarovsk Krai; Vladivostok, Birobidzhan, Yuzhno-Sakhalinsk, Novosibirsk, Omsk and other smaller towns
- Caused by: Arrest of Sergei Furgal
- Goals: Release of Sergei Furgal; Open trial of the governor in Khabarovsk
- Methods: Protests; Demonstrations; Picketing
- Result: Protester demands not met; protests merged into 2021 Russian protests

Parties
Furgal's supporters Supported by: (Russia) Russian opposition: Russia of the Future	(Russia) Federal authorities

Lead figures
Sergei Furgal (arrested); Alexei Vorsin; Leonid Volkov	Vladimir Putin (Russia) Yury Trutnev (Russia) Mikhail Degtyarev (Russia) Sergey Kravchuk

Number
10,000–80,000 concurrent protesters in Khabarovsk; 1,000+ concurrent protesters in other cities	

Protests began on 11 July 2020 in Khabarovsk Krai, Russia, in support of the popular then-Governor, Sergei Furgal, after his arrest that was seen by many as politically motivated. Similar protests in support of Furgal also took place in other mostly eastern cities, including Novosibirsk, Vladivostok and Omsk.

== Background ==
In September 2018, Sergei Furgal won Khabarovsk Krai's gubernatorial election, beating the incumbent from the United Russia party in a landslide victory. The Financial Times reported that "voters who flocked to Mr Furgal say they did so not for his or his party's distinct policies, but as a protest vote against the United Russia incumbent."

In December 2018, President Putin changed the capital of the Far Eastern Federal District from Khabarovsk to Vladivostok.

In September 2019, elections to the Legislative Duma of Khabarovsk Krai resulted in Furgal's party, the Liberal Democratic Party of Russia (LDPR), to win by a landslide and the defeat of the ruling United Russia party.

On 9 July 2020, Furgal was arrested by the Investigative Committee of Russia and flown to Moscow on charges of involvement in the murders of several businessmen in 2004–2005. He denied the allegations. According to LDPR leader Vladimir Zhirinovsky, he suggested Sergei Furgal temporarily resign his powers for the period of the investigation, to avoid a "hard scenario". According to him, Furgal was going to come to Moscow to resign a week before his arrest, however, because of the death of his brother, he remained in Khabarovsk. In the case of a conviction, Zhirinovsky promised to seek a pardon for Furgal.

== Timeline ==
From 11 July 2020, protesters in Khabarovsk for months joined daily to support the now-fired governor Furgal and called for Putin to go.

=== 2020 ===
==== July ====
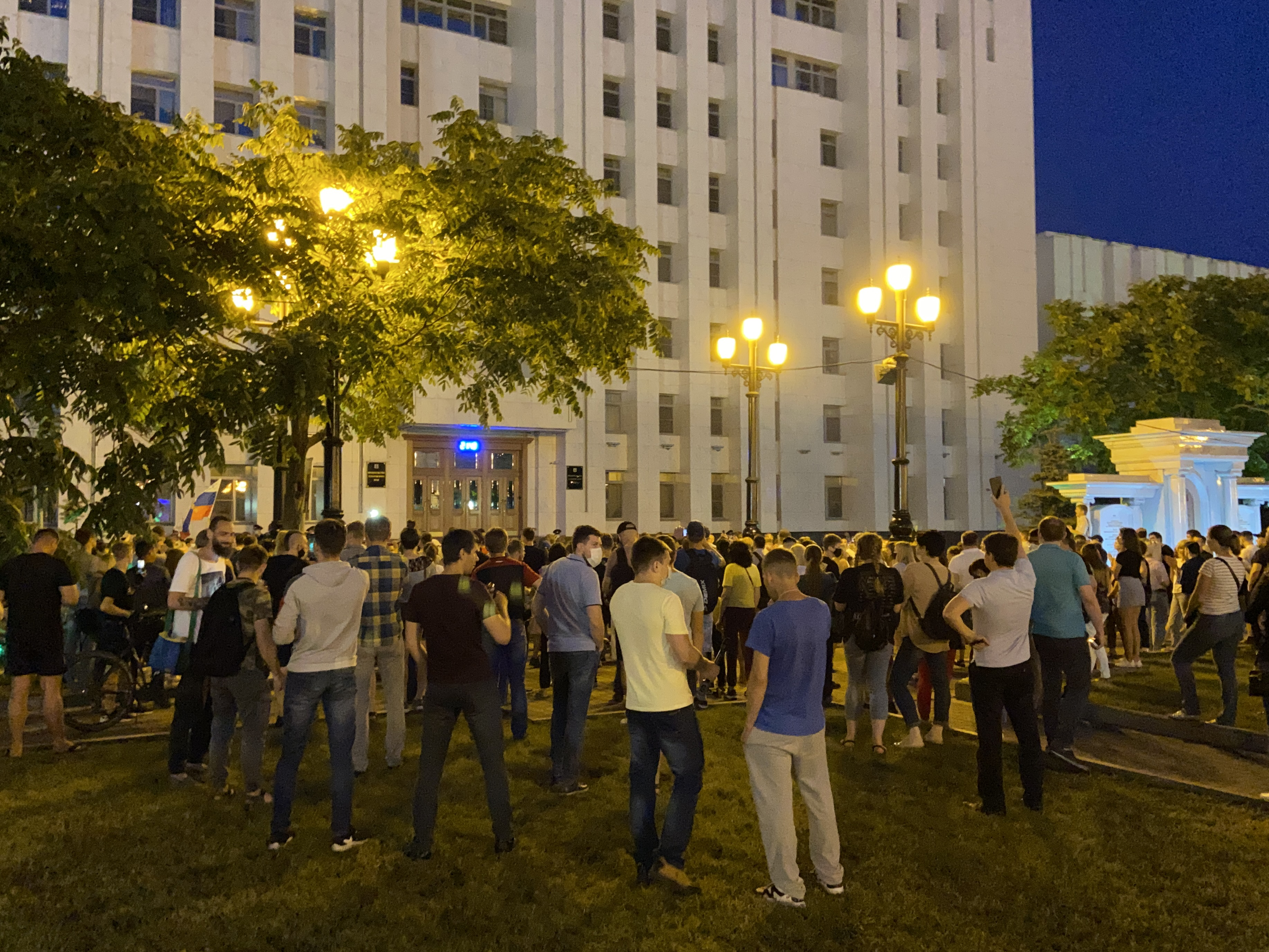
Protesters outside the regional government building, 14 July 2020

On 11 July, 10 to 12 thousand people took part in a rally in Khabarovsk according to estimates by the Ministry of Internal Affairs. The newspaper Kommersant mentioned an estimate of 30-35 thousand people "according to various sources". The protests are held conjointly with the internet campaign "I am/We are Sergei Furgal".

On 12 July, Deputy Prime Minister of Russia — Presidential Plenipotentiary Representative to the Far Eastern Federal District Yury Trutnev arrived in Khabarovsk, who assessed the organisation of work of the region's leadership as poor, and said about the protests that "people have the right to express their opinions".

On 15 July, the federal authorities started to use the threat of the COVID-19 pandemic to discourage people from attending the rallies.

On 18 July, the second major rally in Khabarovsk took place. The mayoral office gave an estimate of up to ten thousand protesters. Dvhab.ru estimated between 15 and 30 thousand participants. Kommersant estimated 50,000 participants. The police did not interfere and distributed face masks to the protesters. In Vladivostok, around 500–1,000 people took part in a rally according to Vl.ru. Two activists were arrested. In Komsomolsk-on-Amur, around 1,000 people partook to the rallies.

On 20 July, Putin dismissed Sergei Furgal due to a "loss of confidence". Mikhail Degtyarev, an MP from the city of Samara, who is also a member of the LDPR, was appointed acting governor until next year's election. Protesters reacted negatively to the appointment of Degtyarev who arrived in the region on 21 July. In response to calls to go back to Moscow, Degtyarev said that he would not leave and that someone else would replace him if he did. During his press conference, Degtyarev said that he does not intend to compete with Furgal in the election if he is acquitted and decides to run for governor again. In this case, Degtyarev will "pack up and return to Moscow". Degtyarev suggested, without evidence, that foreign citizens had flown to Khabarovsk to help organise the protests.

On 21 July, two regional lawmakers in Khabarovsk, Pyotr Yemelyanov and Aleksandr Kayan, opted to leave the Liberal Democratic Party of Russia in protest against Furgal's dismissal.

On 25 July, the third major rally in Khabarovsk took place. The mayoral office gave an estimate of 6,500 protesters, while independent estimates gave higher figures, with some sources estimating it to have been the largest one so far or as large as the last rally. The coordinator of Alexei Navalny's headquarters in Khabarovsk, Alexei Vorsin, gave an estimate of 40,000 participants. The executive director of Open Russia, Andrei Pivovarov, gave an estimate of at least 50,000 participants. Kommersant gave an estimate of at least 50,000 participants. Protests in the city were held for the fifteenth day in a row. DVhab estimated the number of participants to 15-20 thousand people.

On 28 July, the first arrest was made in Khabarovsk. The owner of the "Furgalmobile" food truck was charged under Article 20.2 of the Code of Administrative Offences of the Russian Federation.

==== August ====
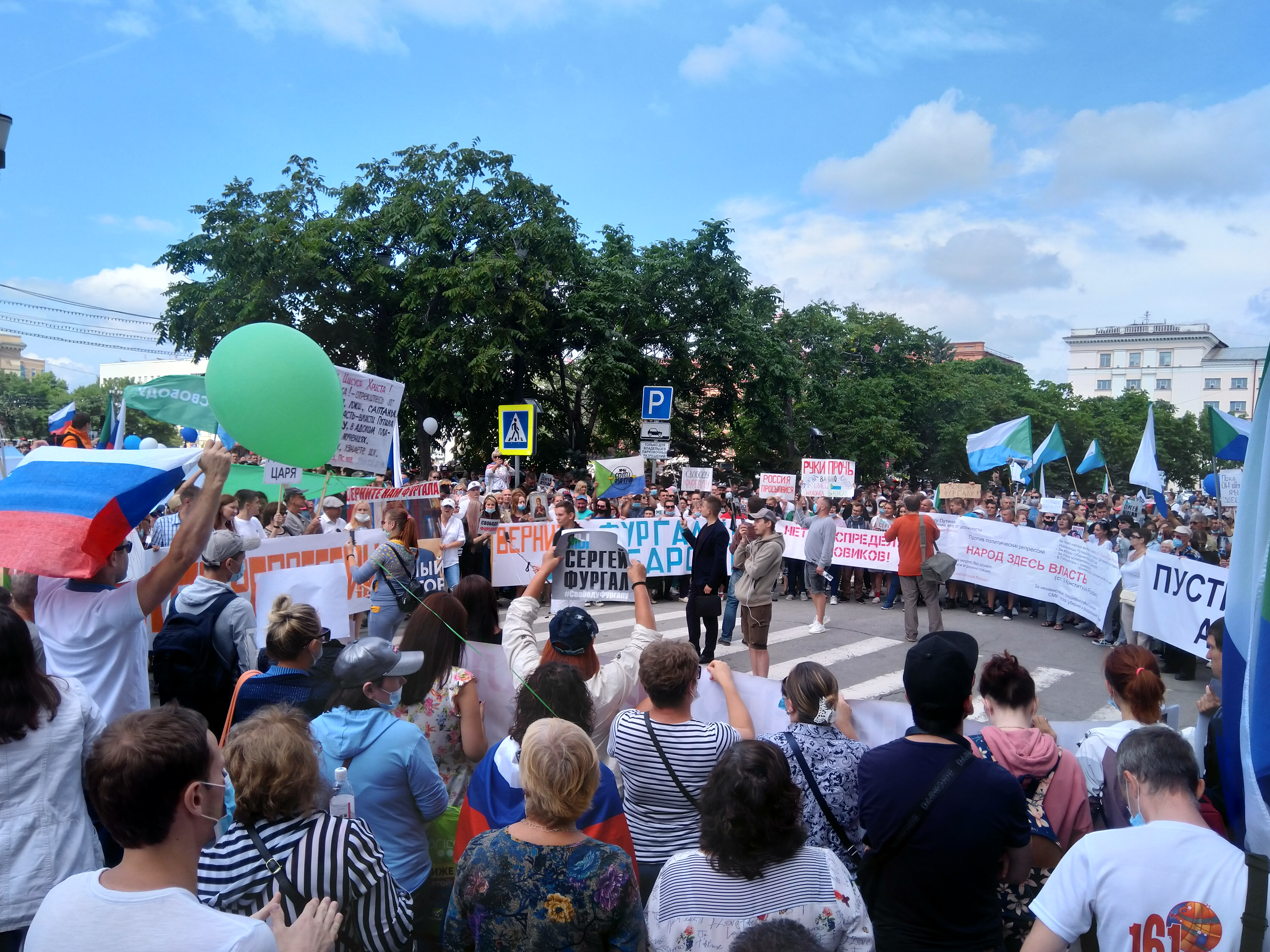
Protest in Khabarovsk on 8 August 2020

On 1 August, the fourth major rally in Khabarovsk took place. Kommersant estimated the turnout to be no less than in the last two weeks, despite the heavy rain in the first half of the day, however the mayoral office gave an estimate 3,500 people. Other independent estimates ranged from 15 to 50 thousand people. Protests took place in other Russian cities, including Irkutsk, Kazan and Krasnodar. In St. Petersburg and Moscow, dozens were detained. According to The Moscow Times, the protests became increasingly anti-Kremlin in the last couple of weeks, with the authorities starting to crack down as two protesters that week were handed two-week long prison sentences and another two on the eve of Saturday's rally were detained and held overnight.

On 8 August, the fifth major rally in Khabarovsk took place. Witnesses and participants quoted by the press suggested that there were tens of thousands of participants, while the mayoral office gave an estimate of 2,800 protesters.

On 15 August, the sixth major rally in Khabarovsk took place. City officials claimed a "significant decline" in turnout with ten times fewer protesters than in the first rally, One news outlet, Baikal 24, gave estimates of a turnout as large as previous rallies. Some protesters expressed solidarity with protesters in Belarus and showed support for them. There were also protesters in Minsk who had shown support for the protesters in Khabarovsk.

On 22 August, the seventh major rally in Khabarovsk took place. The mayoral office gave an estimate of 1,500 protesters however eyewitnesses said there were significantly more. Some expressed support for opposition figure Alexei Navalny and protesters in Belarus.

On 29 August, the eighth major rally (the fiftieth rally overall) in Khabarovsk took place. The mayoral office gave an estimate of 1,200 protesters, while other estimates were higher. It was reported that there was a very small police presence with no police in front of the regional administration building where the protesters were standing.

==== September ====
On 5 September, the ninth major rally in Khabarovsk took place. The website Dvhab.ru reported that there were approximately 5,000 participants according to eyewitnesses. The mayoral office declared that "hardly a thousand people" came out and assessed it as a sharp decline in the number of participants. The BBC Russian Service reported that the protests were declining.

==== October ====
On 10 October, police broke up demonstrations in Khabarovsk and used force against some participants, with 25 being arrested. According to the mayoral office, there were around 500 participants in the initial rally, with opposition groups estimating around 1,000 participants. This was the first time the demonstrations were dispersed.

==== November ====
Composition of the Khabarovsk City Duma, 23–25 November 2020, after the short-lasting resignation of 17 members from the LDPR Independent (17) LDPR (17) A Just Russia (1)

On 23 November, 17 of the 35 deputies of the Khabarovsk City Duma, including the chairman, became independents after the deputies announced their resignation from their party, LDPR, due to disagreement with the regional branch of the party. However two days later, it was announced by the chairman that the decision was reversed after a meeting with the regional party leader and the acting governor Mikhail Degtyarev.

==== December ====
On 12 December, the 23rd major rally and 155th rally overall in Khabarovsk took place, on Constitution Day. According to Deutsche Welle, over 100 people took part.

=== 2021 ===
On 2 January 2021, the regional administration in Khabarovsk stated that the rallies had stopped.

On 9 January 2021, over 100 people gathered at a demonstration.

== Legacy ==
The issue of Furgal was brought up as part of protestors' grievances during the 2021 Russian protests, which began on 23 January 2021, organised largely by opposition figure Alexei Navalny. For instance, that day around 1,000 protesters gathered in Khabarovsk by Lenin Square in support of not only Navalny, but also Furgal. Police dispersed the crowd and detained participants. Moreover, on 19 June 2021, approximately 500 people gathered at a sanctioned rally in Khabarovsk "against political arbitrariness" in support of Furgal. The rally was attended by Furgal's son, Anton.

Response from government authorities to protests became more hardline following the Khabarovsk Krai protests. From 2 July 2021, local authorities introduced a ban on events with more than 10 people citing a spike in coronavirus cases. In accordance with a decree of the regional government, as of 1 May 2022, "Hyde Parks" - places for assemblies without notifying the authorities - were moved from Komsomolskaya Square in Khabarovsk and the square in front of the Druzhba cinema to the DOOF park and square in front of the Rus KDD.

Despite the restrictions, on 5 June 2022, a motor rally in support of Sergei Furgal, agreed with the City Administration, was held with the participation of about 10 cars. On 9 July 2022, on the second anniversary of the arrest of Sergei Furgal, a rally in support of the ex-governor was held in front of the KDD "Rus", which was attended by more than a hundred people. The event was attended by Vasily Kharitonov, deputy of the Khabarovsk Municipal District Assembly of Deputies, as well as Mikhail Sidorov, deputy of the Khabarovsk City Duma. The Khabarovsk bard Andrei Botal sang between the speakers' speeches.

The 2022 Russian invasion of Ukraine and the subsequent political repressions in and militarisation of the country took attention away from the Furgal issue. Only very small gatherings on the issue have been held since then. For example, on 12 February 2023, a rally was held on the square in front of the Rus' Regional Friendship House to mark Sergey Furgal's birthday, which was attended by over seventy residents who were not indifferent. The event was attended by Maxim Kukushkin, deputy of the Legislative Duma of the Khabarovsk region, and Mikhail Sidorov, chairman of the regional branch of the party "Just Russia - For the Truth", deputy of the Khabarovsk City Duma. The crowd held flags and posters and chanted slogans such as: "I, we, he, she - the whole country is for Furgal!", "Freedom for Furgal!" and "Furgal - to the president!". Similar rallies were also held in Komsomolsk-on-Amur and Novosibirsk.

== Public opinion ==
In a Levada Center poll carried out from 24 to 25 July 2020, 83% of Russian respondents knew or had heard about the protests, with 45% of them viewing the protests positively, 26% neutrally and 17% negatively.

In a Levada Center poll carried out from 20 to 26 August 2020, 75% of Russian respondents knew or had heard about the protests, with 47% of them viewing the protests positively, 32% neutrally and 16% negatively. Of those who knew or had heard about the protests, when asked why they thought Furgal was arrested, 32% of them said that the federal government removes politicians that enjoy widespread support, 30% said that Furgal broke the law and that there were no hidden political motives and 15% said that he began to cut the incomes and privileges of officials. Of those who knew or had heard about the protests, when asked if they thought the authorities would make concessions to the protesters, 45% of them said no, 37% said partially and 4% said yes, including the release of Furgal.

== See also ==
- List of protests in the 21st century
