= Andrey Bazilevsky =

Russian politician

- Андрей Базилевский
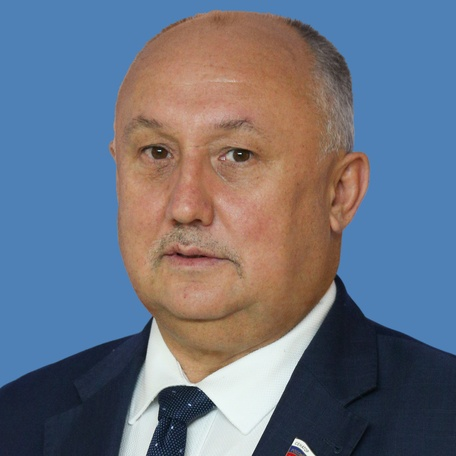

Senator from Khabarovsk Krai
- Incumbent
- Assumed office 24 September 2021
- Preceded by: Yelena Greshnyakova

Personal details
- Born: Andrey Bazilevsky; 24 February 1967 (age 59) Chegdomyn, Khabarovsk Krai, Soviet Union
- Party: United Russia
- Education: Pacific National University

Andrey Aleksandrovich Bazilevsky (Russian: Андрей Александрович Базилевский; born 24 February 1957) is a Russian politician serving as a senator from Khabarovsk Krai since 24 September 2021.

== Career ==
Andrey Bazilevsky was born on 24 February 1957 in Chegdomyn, Khabarovsk Krai.

In 1989 he graduated from Pacific National University. After graduation, he worked as a history teacher in the high school in Khabarovsk.

From 1993 to 1998 Bazilevsky served as Deputy Chairman of the Committee on Youth Affairs of the Administration of the Khabarovsk Krai.

From 1998 to 2006 he was the chairman of the committee on youth policy of the government of the region.

In 2007 he was appointed Minister of Education of the Khabarovsk Territory.

From 2011 to 2014 Bazilevsky was the Deputy Prime Minister and the Minister of Education and Science of the Khabarovsk Krai.

On 24 September 2021 he was appointed a senator from Khabarovsk Krai.

== Sanctions ==
Andrey Bazilevsky is under personal sanctions introduced by the European Union, the United Kingdom, the USA, Canada, Switzerland, Australia, Ukraine, New Zealand, for ratifying the decisions of the "Treaty of Friendship, Cooperation and Mutual Assistance between the Russian Federation and the Donetsk People's Republic and between the Russian Federation and the Luhansk People's Republic" and providing political and economic support for Russia's annexation of Ukrainian territories.
