= Legislative Duma of Khabarovsk Krai =

Regional parliament of Khabarovsk Krai, Russia

Legislative Duma of Khabarovsk Krai Законодательная дума Хабаровского края
- 8th legislature
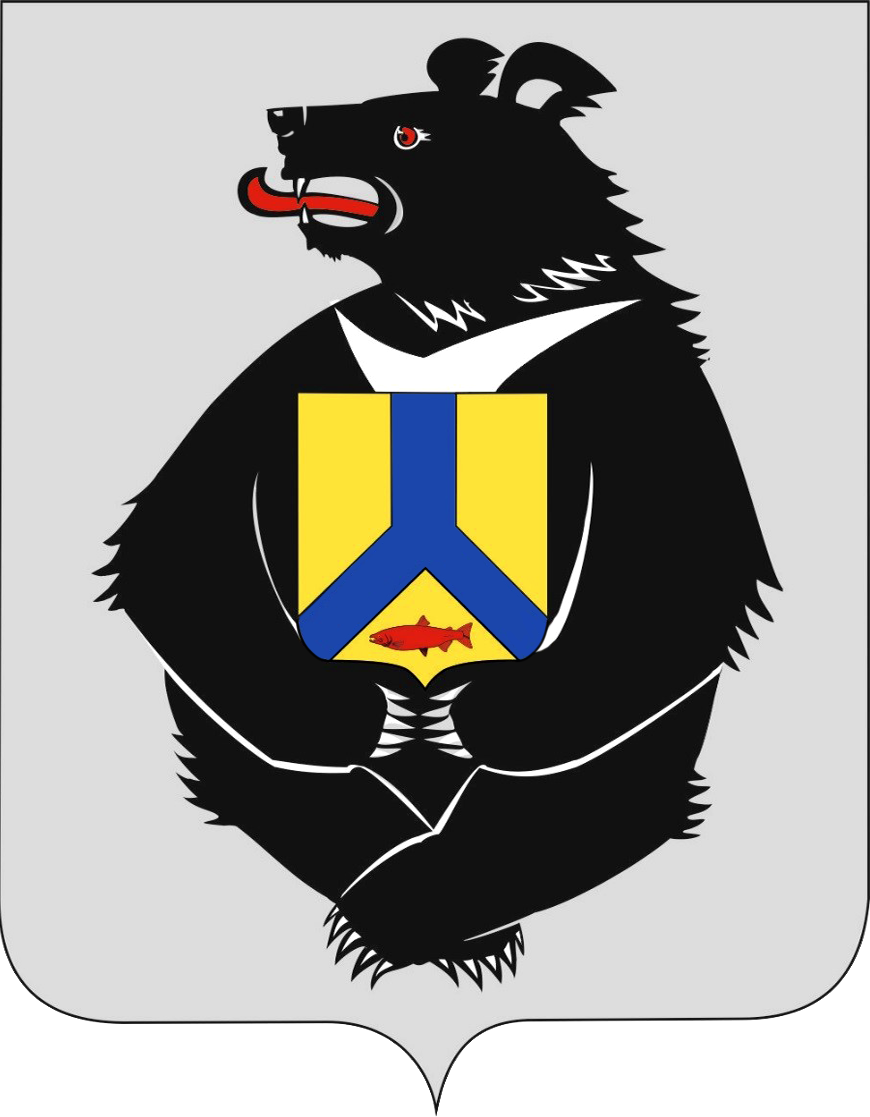

Type
- Type: Unicameral

Leadership
- Chairwoman: Nikolai Shevtsov, United Russia since 26 September 2024

Structure
- Seats: 36
- Political groups: United Russia (28) LDPR (5); CPRF (1); SR—ZP (1) New People (1)

Elections
- Voting system: Mixed: 24 deputies elected in single-member districts and 12 elected proportionally
- Last election: 8 September 2024
- Next election: 2029

Meeting place
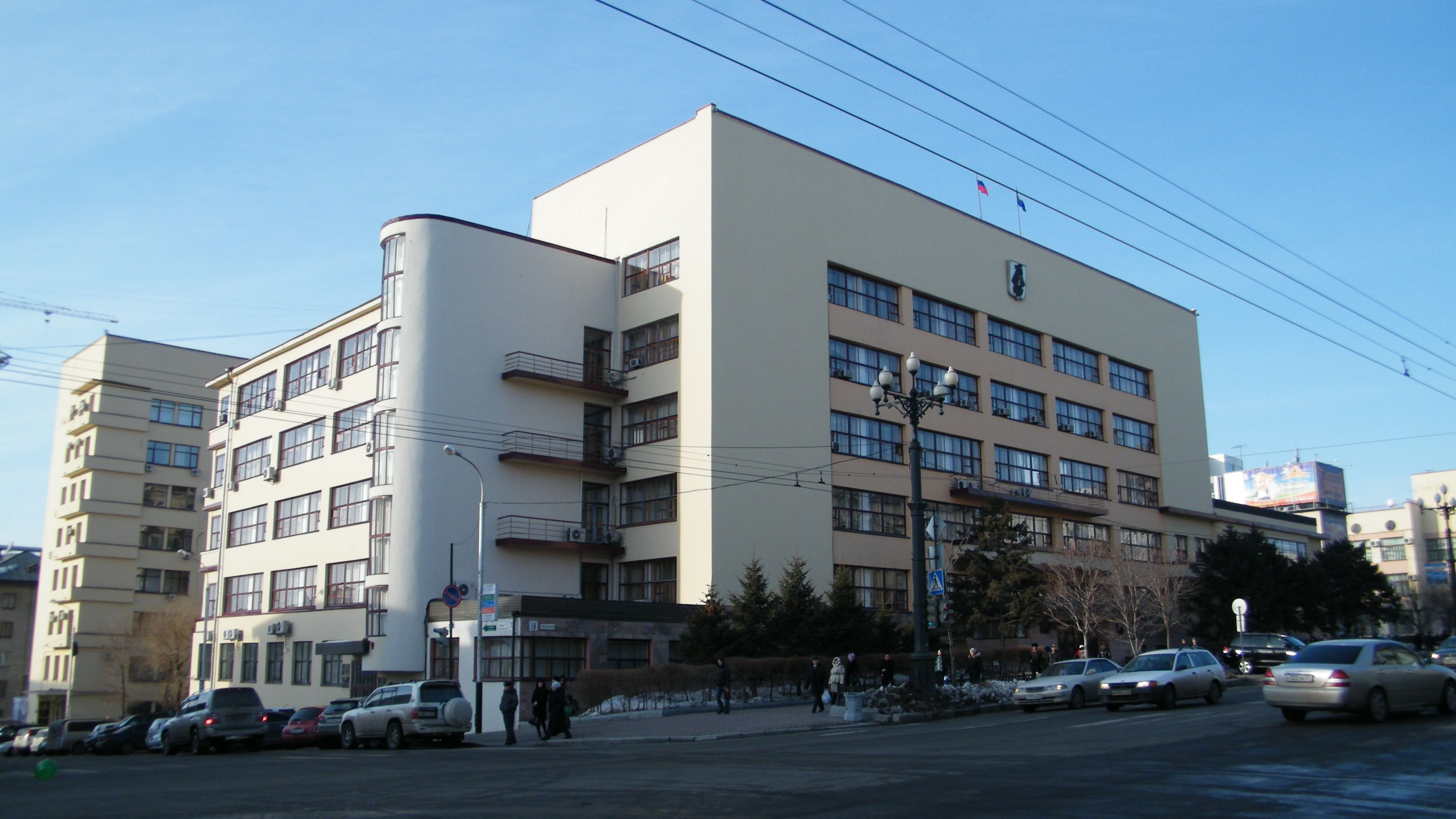
- Muravyova-Amurskogo Street, Khabarovsk

Website
- duma.khv.ru

The Legislative Duma of Khabarovsk Krai (Russian: Законодательная дума Хабаровского края, romanized: Zakonodatelnaya duma Khabarovskogo kraya) is the regional parliament of Khabarovsk Krai, a federal subject of Russia.

The Duma consists of 36 deputies elected for a term of five years. 24 deputies are elected by single-member constituencies and another 12 deputies are elected in party lists.

== History ==
Elections were last held on 8 September 2019. Governor Sergei Furgal's party, LDPR, won by a landslide in the election, gaining 27 seats (30 total) and therefore a supermajority, while the ruling party, United Russia, lost 28 seats and its supermajority.

In December 2019, a deputy from LDPR, Sergey Bezdenezhnykh, was appointed as a senator to the Federation Council with 22 votes out of the 30 deputies present in the Legislative Duma.

In June 2020, LDPR deputy Vyacheslav Furgal, the brother of Sergei Furgal, died in June 2020 due to COVID-19.

By-elections were held on 13 September 2020.

In 2024 United Russia returned to power, winning 28 seats with a 33.42% swing.

== Elections ==
=== 2014 ===
Party	%	Seats
United Russia	57.14	30
Communist Party of the Russian Federation	14.12	3
Liberal Democratic Party of Russia	13.34	3
A Just Russia	4.37	0
Rodina	3.68	0
Communists of Russia	2.23	0
Yabloko	1.72	0

=== 2019 ===
Composition of the parliament following the 2019 elections

Party	%	Seats
Liberal Democratic Party of Russia	56.12	30
Communist Party of the Russian Federation	17.24	3
United Russia	12.51	2
Self-nominated (Yabloko)	—	1
A Just Russia	3.53	0
Communists of Russia	3.43	0
Party of Growth	1.74	0
Rodina	1.69	0
Registered voters/turnout	34.81	

=== 2024 ===
Party	%	Seats
United Russia	45.93	28
Liberal Democratic Party of Russia	16.75	5
Communist Party of the Russian Federation	12.59	1
A Just Russia	7.32	1
New People	5.35	1
Party of Pensioners	4.07	0
Communists of Russia	2.01	0
Rodina	0.89	0
Registered voters/turnout	34.81	

== List of chairpersons ==
The chairperson of the Legislative Duma of Khabarovsk Krai is the presiding officer of that legislature.

Name	Took office	Left office
Victor Ozerov	1994	2001
Yury Onoprienko	2001	2009
Anatoly Ostrovsky	2009	2010
Sergey Khokhlov	2010	2013
Viktor Chudov	2013	2016
Sergey Lugovskoy	2016	2019
Irina Zikunova	2019	2024
Nikolai Shevtsov	2024	-
