= Mikhail Degtyarev =

Russian politician (born 1981)

- Михаил Дегтярёв
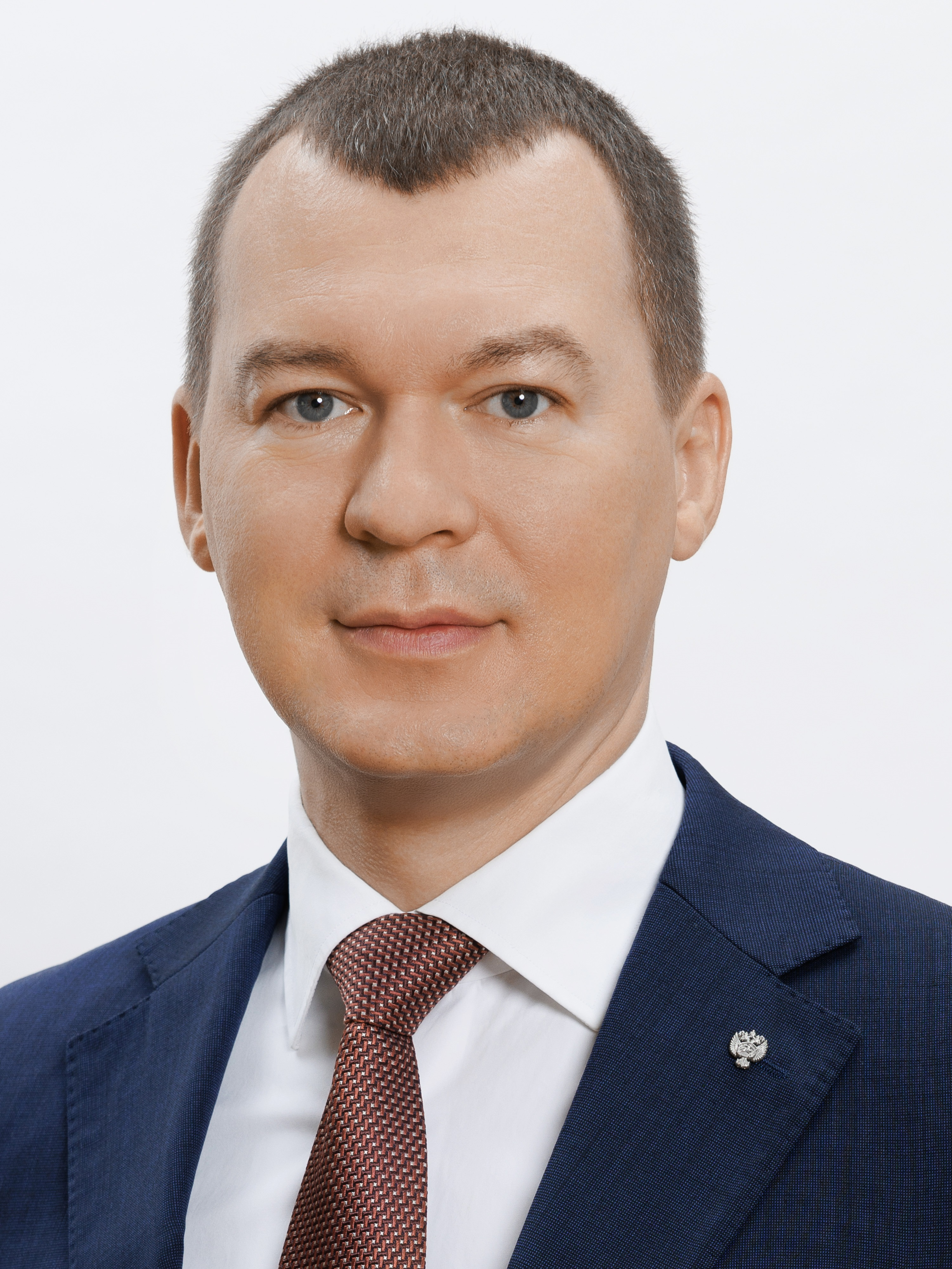
- Official portrait, 2025

Minister of Sport
- Incumbent
- Assumed office 14 May 2024
- President: Vladimir Putin
- Prime Minister: Mikhail Mishustin
- Preceded by: Oleg Matytsin

Governor of Khabarovsk Krai
- In office 24 September 2021 – 14 May 2024
- Preceded by: Sergei Furgal
- Succeeded by: Aleksandr Nikitin (acting); Dmitry Demeshin

Chairman of the State Duma committee on physical education, sports, tourism and Youth affairs
- In office 5 October 2016 – 20 July 2020
- Preceded by: Dmitry Svishchev
- Succeeded by: Boris Paykin

Deputy of the State Duma Russia
- In office 21 December 2011 – 20 July 2020
- Succeeded by: Dmitry Piyanykh
- Constituency: Samara Oblast

Deputy of the Samara Oblast Duma
- In office 11 March 2007 – 12 December 2011
- Chairman of the Duma: Alexander Fetisov

Deputy of the Samara City Duma
- In office 5 July 2004 – 11 March 2007
- Chairman of the Duma: Vitaly Ilyin
- Constituency: Samara

Personal details
- Born: 10 July 1981 (age 45) Kuibyshev, Russian SFSR, Soviet Union
- Party: Liberal Democratic (2005–present)
- Other political affiliations: United Russia (2003–2005)
- Spouse: Galina Degtyareva
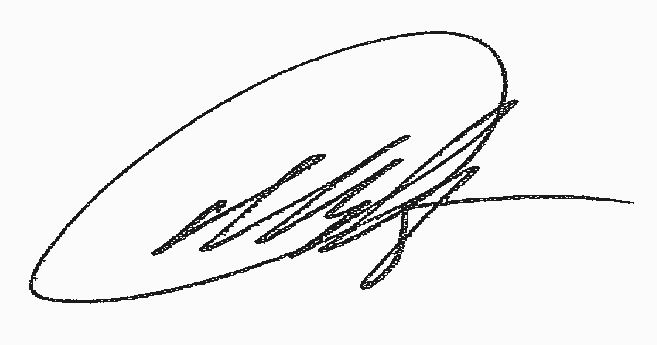
- Signature
- Mikhail Degtyarev's voice Degtyarev on the Echo of Moscow program, 22 July 2013

Mikhail Vladimirovich Degtyarev (Note: Also transliterated as Degtyaryov. In this name that follows East Slavic naming customs, the patronymic is Vladimirovich and the family name is Degtyarev.) (Russian: Михаил Владимирович Дегтярёв; born 10 July 1981) is a Russian politician serving as Russia's Minister of Sport since 14 May 2024. He currently serves as the president of Russian Olympic Committee since December 2024.

Degtyarev was Governor of Khabarovsk Krai from 24 September 2021 to 14 May 2024. He was chairman of the State Duma committee on physical education, sports, tourism and Youth affairs from 2016 to 2020 and Deputy of the State Duma Russia from December 2011 to July 2020. He stood as a candidate for mayor of Moscow in the 2013 and 2018 elections.

== Biography ==
In 1998, Degtyarev graduated from the Samara International Aerospace High School. In 2004, he graduated from the Samara State Aerospace University, Faculty of aircraft engines (specialty "engineer"), and he also received a special "manager" in the same high school at the Faculty of Economics and Management in 2005.

In September 2003, Degtyarev joined the party United Russia.

In 2004, as a self-promoter he was elected a deputy of the Samara City Duma. In 2005, he left United Russia and joined the Liberal Democratic Party of Russia.

In 2007, he was elected to the Samara Governorate Duma on the Liberal Democratic Party.

On 4 December 2011, Degtyarev was elected to the State Duma 6th convocation of the Liberal Democratic Party party list of the Samara Oblast. Worked as Vice Chairman the State Duma Committee for Science and High Technology.

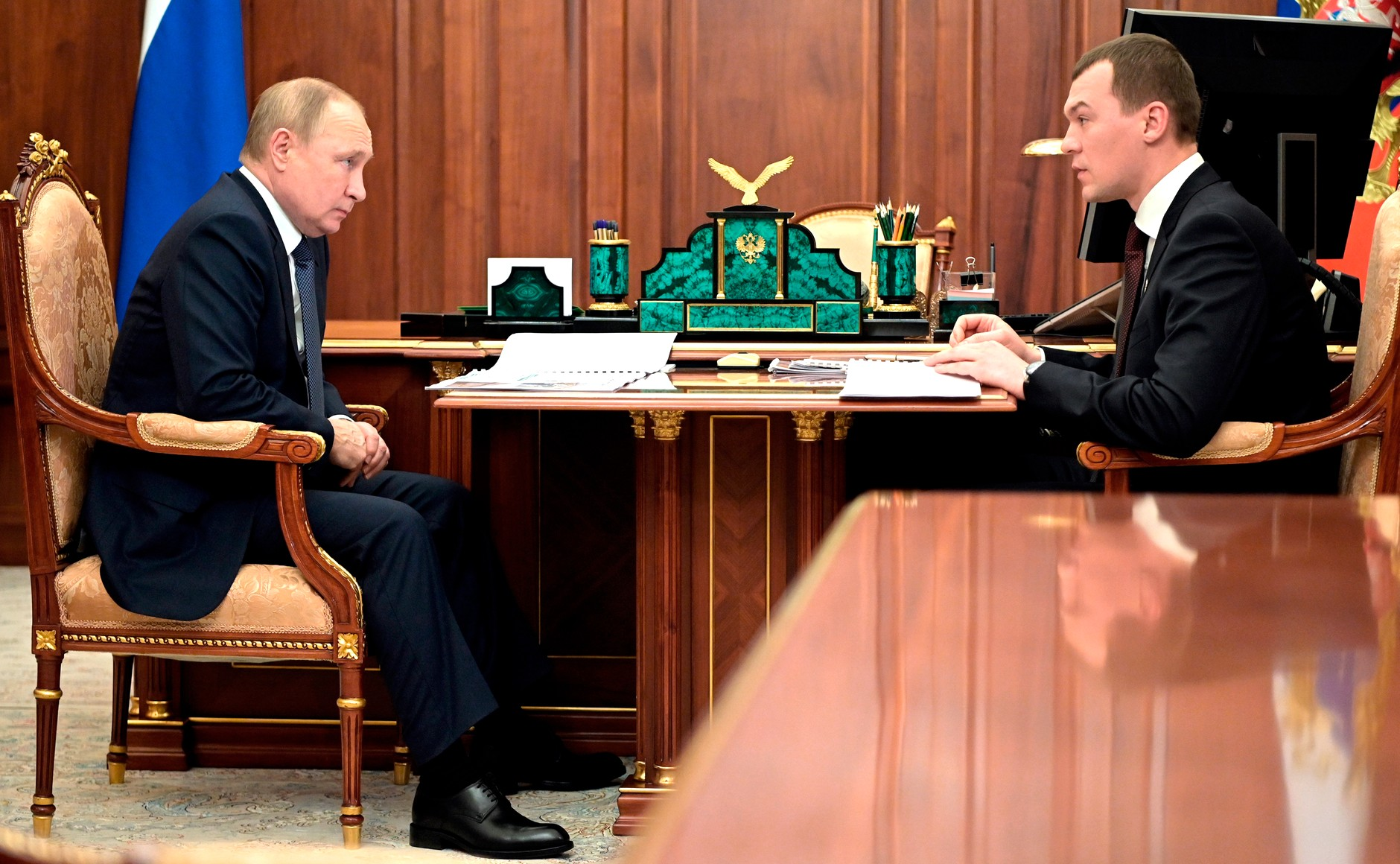
Degtyarev with Russian President Vladimir Putin, 28 April 2022

On 25 March 2013, he was elected member of the Supreme Council of the Liberal Democratic Party.

On 2 March 2016, Vladimir Zhirinovsky called Degtyarev one of the possible candidates for the post of President of Russia from Liberal Democratic Party in the elections of 2018.

Degtyarev was sent to Khabarovsk by Vladimir Putin to replace the popular local governor, Sergei Furgal, who was arrested on 9 July 2020. Degtyarev was unpopular among the local people.

In September 2022, residents of the region started a petition proposing to remove Degtyarev from the post of governor and send him to fight in the war in Ukraine, which was signed by several tens of thousands of people. Degtyarev replied that he would volunteer for Ukraine, but could not due to his duties as governor.

On 14 May 2024 he was appointed as Minister of Sport and left his position as Governor of Khabarovsk Krai.

In 2025, he defended his doctoral dissertation at the Kutafin Moscow State Law University (MSAL) on the topic “Innovative Public-Law Regimes” (academic advisor: Professor I. V. Ponkin) and was awarded the degree of Doctor of Legal Sciences.

== Moscow mayoral elections ==
=== 2013 ===
In June 2013, the Liberal Democratic Party nominated Degtyarev as the party's candidate for Mayor of Moscow. Degtyarev received 66,232 votes (2.86%), finishing fifth.

=== 2018 ===
On 20 June 2018, Degtyarev was again nominated as a candidate for Mayor of Moscow. Vladimir Zhirinovsky, speaking to the participants of the conference of the Moscow branch of the Liberal Democratic Party, said: "Our candidate is Mikhail Degtyarev, Deputy of the State Duma. Educated man, graduated from several universities, master of sports in fencing, a father with many children — he has three sons. Write a book. He will go to the elections of the Mayor of Moscow for the second time, he has a lot of experience. Thus, we have nominated a candidate from the LDPR, who meets the highest standards of time, we will all help him, including me."

== Initiatives ==
- In June 2012, Degtyarev developed a bill to provide federal maternity capital for the birth or adoption of a child has the first (and not only the second, as it is now).
- On 9 December 2012, Degtyarev introduced to the State Duma a bill on the abolition of the local government in the cities and converting them into "megalopolises". According to the initiative Degtyaryova, selected on the general elections could be only deputies of district councils megacities, which would lead to a reduction in the size of single-member districts and improve interaction with voters. According to the deputy, instead of Mayors megacities have to manage Vice Governors, dealing exclusively economic activity, rather than conflict with the leadership of the regions, which often took place in the political history of Russia.
- On 11 February 2013, the deputies Degtyarev has prepared a draft federal law on the free Wi-Fi on the territory of universities for students, teachers and university staff.
- In May 2013, Degtyarev proposed a ban on storing and US dollars turnover in Russia by preparing the corresponding bill. The need to ban US dollars, he explained the care of cash savings of the Russians. According to the bill after two years the competent authorities upon detection of the US currency will confiscate it for the benefit of the federal budget. In November of the same year Degtyarev again raised the issue of banning dollars walking.
- On 16 July 2016, Degtyarev was introduced to the State Duma a bill on changing colors stripes of the national flag. Instead of the white-blue-red tricolor official status proposed to assign black-yellow-white flag of the Russian Empire. "Under the imperial flag, we scored a brilliant victory, it is able today to unite all the citizens of Russia" — he told the Izvestia newspaper said.

== Sanctions ==
For undermining the territorial integrity of Ukraine, Degtyarev was included in the European Union, Canada and United Kingdom sanctions list in 2014, and on the New Zealand sanctions list in 2022. In 2018, he was sanctioned by Ukraine and by Australia in 2020. In response to the Russian invasion of Ukraine, the Office of Foreign Assets Control of the United States Department of the Treasury added Degtyarev to the Specially Designated Nationals and Blocked Persons List on 24 February 2023 for his involvement in the "implementation of Russian operations and aggression against Ukraine, illegal administration of the occupied Ukrainian territories in the interests of the Russian Federation" and "calling Russian citizens to fight in the war." This results in his assets being frozen and U.S. persons being prohibited from dealing with him. For similar reasons, he was sanctioned by New Zealand and Switzerland in 2022. According to Politico, in March 2025, the EU removed Degtyarov from its 2000-person sanctions list within the deal with Hungary, which had threatened to veto the whole sanctions framework.
