= Sergei Furgal =

Russian politician (born 1970)

- Сергей Фургал
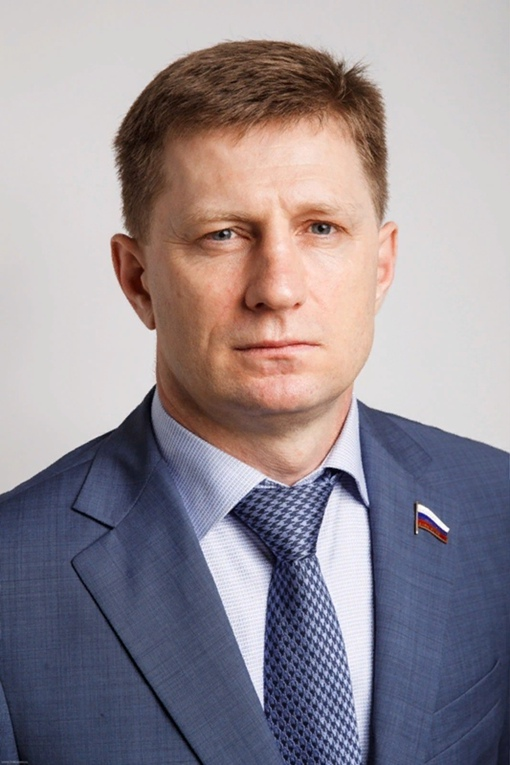

3rd Governor of Khabarovsk Krai
- In office 28 September 2018 – 20 July 2020
- President: Vladimir Putin
- Preceded by: Vyacheslav Shport
- Succeeded by: Mikhail Degtyarev

Member of the State Duma
- In office 24 December 2007 – 27 September 2018
- Constituency: Komsomolsk-na-Amure (2016–18)

Personal details
- Born: Sergei Ivanovich Furgal; 12 February 1970 (age 56) Poyarkovo, Amur Oblast, Russian SFSR, Soviet Union
- Party: Liberal Democratic Party of Russia
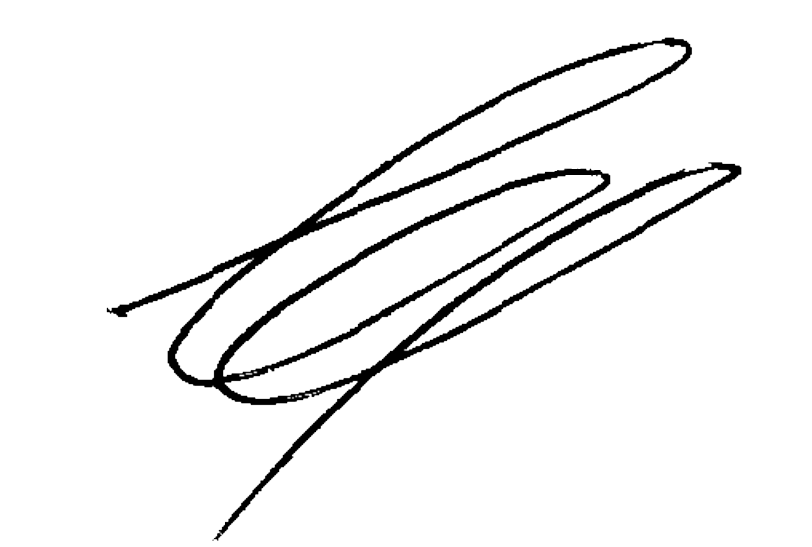
- Signature

Sergei Ivanovich Furgal (/fʊərˈɡɑːl/ foor-GAHL; Russian: Сергей Иванович Фургал; born 12 February 1970) is a Russian politician who served as Governor of Khabarovsk Krai from 2018 until 2020. He previously served as a member of the State Duma from 2007 to 2018.

Described as populist, Furgal was a member of the LDPR party, and won the 2018 Khabarovsk Krai gubernatorial election in a landslide against incumbent Vyacheslav Shport, who was backed by the ruling United Russia. Furgal maintained high approval ratings throughout his governorship, but was arrested and removed from office in 2020 after being accused of committing double murder fifteen years prior. In response to his arrest, regarded by many as politically motivated, mass protests were held in the region calling for his release. In 2023, Furgal was sentenced to 22 years in prison following a jury's guilty verdict.

== Biography ==
Furgal holds a medical degree from Blagoveshchensk State Medical Institute and practiced from 1992 to 1999.

In 2008, Furgal was awarded the Honorary Diploma of the Chairman of the State Duma for his contributions to the development of legislation and parliamentarism in Russia.

In the 6th State Duma, he held the position of chairman of the committee on health protection from October 2015 to October 2016. From 2005 to 2007, he was a deputy of the Legislative Duma of the Khabarovsk Krai on a temporary basis. He holds a master's degree in Economics from the Russian Academy of Public Service, and a bachelor's degree in the medical field from Amur State Medical Academy.

== Governorship ==
=== Election ===
When Furgal announced his candidacy in the 2018 gubernatorial election, he was widely seen as having little chance of victory, as incumbent Vyacheslav Shport was expected to win. In the first round, however, Furgal gained a surprise 35.81%, whilst Shport gained 35.62%. In the second round, Furgal was elected Governor of Khabarovsk Krai in a landslide, gaining 69.57%. His win was largely attributed to anti-establishment sentiment shared on both the left and right of the political spectrums. According to The Moscow Times, "Protest-minded voters in the region back then were ready to vote for anyone in order to defeat the candidate backed by the regime. ... Putin had personally backed the incumbent, Vyacheslav Shport, so Furgal’s refusal to quit the race was seen as unforgivable".

Furgal took office on 28 September 2018. Since then, his party has won a number of statewide and local elections. With the help of Alexei Navalny's Smart Voting, the Liberal Democratic Party of Russia (LDPR) gained a majority in the Legislative Duma of Khabarovsk Krai, the City Duma of Khabarovsk, the City Duma of Komsomolsk-on-Amur, and two seats in the State Duma in 2019.

== Arrest and trial ==
On 9 July 2020, Furgal was arrested by federal authorities on charges of involvement in multiple murders of several businessmen in the region and nearby territories in 2004 and 2005. He faced a maximum sentence of life in prison. Furgal denied the allegations.

Protests in support of Furgal began after his arrest. On 11 July, tens of thousands of people were estimated to have taken part in the protests in Khabarovsk against Furgal's arrest with slogans against President Putin, alleging the timing of the arrest was politically motivated – Furgal won by a landslide against the Kremlin's candidate in Khabarovsk Krai's gubernatorial election in 2018. While the rally was unauthorised, no arrests were made and police did not intervene.

Subsequently, Furgal was replaced by Mikhail Degtyarev on 20 July. Two regional lawmakers in Khabarovsk opted to leave the LDPR in protest against Furgal's dismissal.

According to the Financial Times, an employee of the Russian presidential administration said on condition of anonymity that: "The target set for my colleagues was to decrease the approval rating for governor Furgal, and prepare him for election defeat. They started working on Furgal now because they failed to fulfil the rating plan: He was too popular. The arrest is not about murders, it is solely about politics."

In May 2022, Furgal's trial began in Lyubertsy City Court in Moscow Oblast where he was charged with attempted murder as well as having ordered two killings in 2004 and 2005 where he faced a life sentence; Furgal rejected any involvement and called the case politically motivated. In November, Furgal began a hunger strike while his trial continued.

On 2 February 2023, a guilty verdict was given by the jury for double murder. A small protest was held in Khabarovsk's Lenin Square following the verdict. On 8 February, the state prosecutor requested 23 years in prison following the jury's verdict. On 10 February, the court sentenced Furgal to 22 years in a strict regime colony. Three other defendants were also sentenced.

On 3 December 2025, the Babushkinsky District Court in Moscow convicted Furgal on charges of creating an organized crime group, abuse of power, large-scale fraud, money laundering and illegal business activity in a separate case involving four bank loans totaling 2.67 billion rubles ($34.5 million) that were issued to companies linked to Furgal’s businesses. He was sentenced to an additional 23 years in prison.

== Family ==
Furgal is the youngest of 10 children in his family. One of his brothers, Vyacheslav (1953–2020), a member of the Legislative Duma of Khabarovsk Krai, died of COVID-19 on 13 June 2020. Furgal is married and has 3 children. His son, Anton (born 2 August 1991), is also a member of LDPR.
