= MTS 945 =

Smartphone model

MTS 945 GLONASS
- Brand: Mobile TeleSystems and Sistema
- Manufacturer: ZTE
- Type: Touchscreen smartphone
- First released: 31 March 2011; 15 years ago
- Form factor: Slate
- Dimensions: 109.1 mm (4.30 in) H 55.9 mm (2.20 in) W 14.1 mm (0.56 in) D
- Weight: 130 g (4.6 oz)
- Operating system: Android 2.2 "Froyo"
- System-on-chip: Qualcomm MSM7230
- CPU: ARMv7 Scorpion
- GPU: Adreno 205
- Memory: 130 MB
- Removable storage: Up to 32 GB microSD
- Battery: 1500 mAh Li-ion
- Rear camera: 2 megapixels
- Display: 3.2 in (81 mm) TFT 145.77 ppi (400x240)
- Connectivity: List: Wi-Fi :802.11 b/g; Bluetooth 2.1; GPS/GLONASS; 3.5 millimetres (0.14 in) headphone jack; USB 2.0 (Micro-B port, USB charging)
- Model: MTS 945

The MTS 945 GLONASS was the world's first smartphone that was compatible with GLONASS. The phone was available from Mobile TeleSystems, and was built by Qualcomm and ZTE. The phone was released on March 31, 2011. The phone was discontinued following low sales numbers.

== History ==
On December 28, 2010 the CEO of AFK Sistema Vladimir Yevtushenkov and the Russian Deputy Prime Minister Sergei Ivanov presented Vladimir Putin with the MTS 945 - the first phone equipped with a dual system GLONASS\GPS.

During the meeting, Vladimir Yevtushenko claimed that the phone was equivalent to the iPhone 4, with the addition of GLONASS capabilities.

The MTS 945 was developed jointly by Sitronics, Qualcomm, and ZTE, and went on sale in March 2011 at the price of 10 990 rubles (US$360).

The initial plans for the phone called for 500,000 units shipped in the first batch, however in early 2011 it was reduced to 100,000. This was later reduced again to just 5000 units, which took six months to sell.

In February 2012 ZTE announced that they were ending production of the phone due to poor sales. Before the MTS 945 was released ZTE was planning to create 3-5 phones with support for GLONASS, but the slow launch month put those plans into development hell, and they were eventually cancelled. Huawei, which was also planning to launch a phone with GLONASS around the same time decided to delay the launch of their own GLONASS compatible phones.

== Specifications ==
The phone is capable of receiving signals of two Global Navigation Satellite Systems: GLONASS and GPS.

The phone's SoC is the Qualcomm MSM7230, and it runs Android.

== Criticism ==
Tests found that the MTS 945 performed comparably to or worse than comparable smartphones that also ran Android 2.2 and only received signals from GPS. At the same time, the MTS 945 GLONASS was significantly more expensive than the other devices this level.

== Next model ==
In May 2012, MTS launched a second smartphone with GLONASS, the MTS 962. The new model was launched at half the price of its predecessor, about 5300 rubles.
