= Eduard Shpolsky =

Eduard Vladimirovich Shpolsky
- Born: 23 September 1892; Voronezh
- Died: 21 August 1975 (aged 82); Moscow, Russia
- Education: Moscow State University
- Known for: Shpolskii matrix
- Scientific career
- Fields: Physics, optics, spectroscopy

Eduard Vladimirovich Shpolsky, also Shpolsk'ii, Shpolskii (Russian: Эдуард Владимирович Шпольский; 23 September 1892 – 21 August 1975) was a Russian and Soviet physicist and educator, co-founder and lifelong editor of Uspekhi Fizicheskikh Nauk journal (Soviet Physics Uspekhi and Physics-Uspekhi in English translation).

Shpolsky primary scientific contribution belongs to the field of molecular spectroscopy, particularly luminescence and absorption spectra of polycyclic aromatic hydrocarbons. In 1952 Shpolsky and his junior researchers A. A. Ilyina and L. A. Klimov discovered Shpolsky effect (Shpolskii matrixes, an optical analogy to Mössbauer effect) in organic compounds, a property that allows highly selective spectroscopic identification of substances that normally do not possess clearly defined spectral lines or bands. The discovery evolved into a discipline of its own, Shpolsky spectroscopy. Shpolsky authored the definitive Russian language university textbook on Atomic Physics, first printed in 1944 and reissued until 1974.

== Biography ==
Shpolsky studied at the department of physics of Moscow State University. In the aftermath of the Casso affair of 1911 professors of physics Pyotr Lazarev and Pyotr Lebedev and their assistant Sergey Vavilov resigned and joined the faculty of the fledgling private Shanyavsky University. Shpolsky followed them, remaining de jure a student of Moscow State, and made his first research assignment in Lazarev's private laboratory in Arbat District. He graduated from the department of physics of Moscow State University in 1913 and joined the staff of Shanyavsky University. In 1918 he returned to Moscow State University and lectured there until 1939. In 1932 he also joined the faculty of Moscow State Pedagogical Institute and chaired its department of physics for 46 years. He received the doctorate at MSU in 1933.

After World War II Shpolsky engaged in physical studies of carcinogens. He reasoned that carcinogens should possess physical properties distinct from harmless substances, and although no such link was ever found, his studies led to the discovery of Shpolsky effect. In 1952 Shpolsky, Ilyina and Klimov published an article in Doklady Akademii Nauk asserting that complex organic substances that normally do not have clearly defined spectral lines do, in fact, emit or absorb them at low temperatures when mixed with specific organic solvents. Use of the solvent, forming a snow-like paraffin structure at 77 K, was a radical departure from an established spectroscopy routine. In the same year Pyotr Kapitsa provided Shpolsky his laboratory to repeat the experiment at lower temperatures. This property became known as Shpolsky effect; Soviet authorities formally recognized it as a discovery only after Shpolsky's death. Organic compounds possessing this effect became known as Shpolsky matrixes and Shpolsky systems. The method, although lacking solid theoretical foundation, provided extreme spectral selectivity and became a major improvement in detecting 3,4-benzapyrene in the 1960s. In 1961 Karl Rebane suggested that Shpolsky effect was an optical analogy to Mössbauer effect (see zero-phonon line and phonon sideband). Roman Personov, an alumnus of Shpolsky laboratory, confirmed Karl Rebane hypothesis in 1971. Later studies showed that matrix isolation fluorimetry has significant practical advantages over original Shpolsky methode.

== Sources ==
- Bolotnikova, T. N. (1992). "Effecty Shpolskogo ("Эффекты Шпольского (К 100-летию со дня рождения Э.В. Шпольского)")". Uspekhi Fizicheskikh Nauk (in Russian). 162 (11): 183–195. doi:10.3367/UFNr.0162.199211d.0183.
- Bolotnikova, T. N.; V. L. Ginzburg (1976). "Obituary ("Памяти Эдуарда Владимировича Шпольского")". Uspekhi Fizicheskikh Nauk (in Russian). 118 (1).
- Roman Personov; Ariese, Freek; Hofstraat, Johannes W (2000). The historical development of high-resolution selective spectroscopy of organic molecules in solids. Wiley-IEEE. p. 578. ISBN 978-0-471-24508-7., in:
  - Cees Gooijer; Freek Ariese; Johannes W. Hofstraat (2000). Shpol'skii spectroscopy and other site-selection methods: applications in environmental analysis, bioanalytical chemistry, and chemical physics. Wiley-IEEE. p. 578. ISBN 0-471-24508-9.
- Gary M. Hieftje; John C. Travis; Fred E. Lytle (1981). Lasers in chemical analysis. Humana Press. p. 348. ISBN 978-0-89603-027-5.
- Pyotr Kapitsa (1980). Experiment, theory, practice: articles and addresses. Springer. p. 465. ISBN 90-277-1062-7.
- Shpolsky, E. V. (1965). "Remembering Sergey Vavilov (Из воспоминаний о С. И. Вавилове)". Archived from the original on 2011-07-24. published in: predisl. i vstupit. stat'ja I. M. Franka (1991). Sergey Ivanovich Vavilov (Сергей Иванович Вавилов. Очерки и воспоминания) 3rd edition. Moscow: Nauka. ISBN 5-02-000245-3. pp. 171–179
- Shabad, L. M. (1967). "Studies in the USSR on the Distribution, Circulation and Fate of Carcinogenic Hydrocarbons: a Review" (PDF). Cancer Research. 27 (1): 1132–1137.
