= Dalcombank =

Bank of Russia

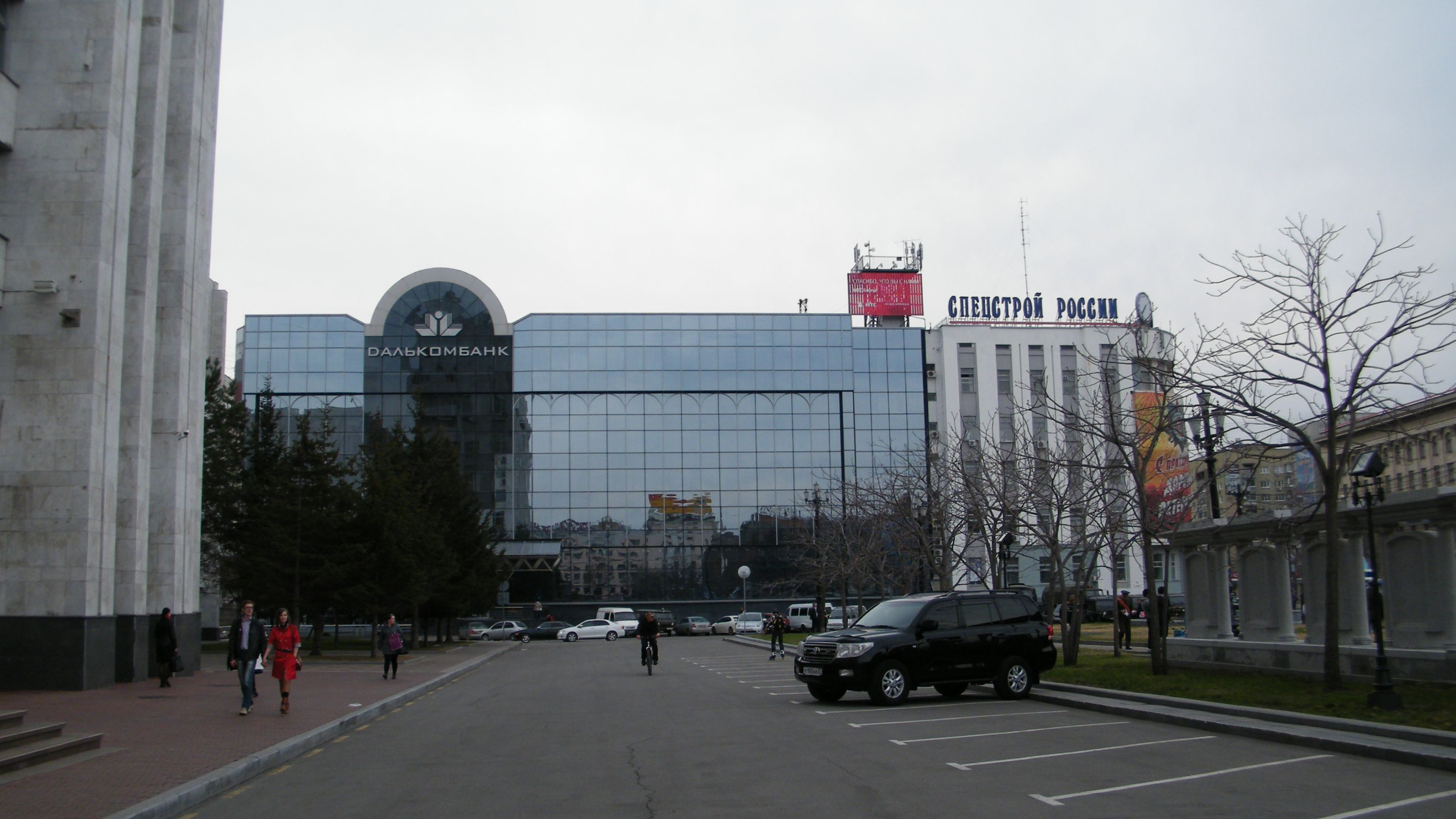
- Dalcombank's Lenin Square headquarters in 2012
- Company type: Open joint-stock company
- Industry: Financial services
- Founded: April 25, 1989
- Defunct: 2012
- Fate: Acquired and merged
- Successor: MTS Bank
- Headquarters: Khabarovsk, Russia
- Area served: Russian Far East
- Products: Banking services
- Website: www.dalcombank.ru dalcombank.ru Archived August 26, 2009, at the Wayback Machine

Dalcombank (Russian: Далькомбанк) was one of the largest banks in the Russian Far East. Its headquarters were located on Lenin Square in Khabarovsk. It was merged with MTS Bank in 2012.

== History ==
On April 25, 1989, a bank charter was registered by Central bank board under number 84. Back then was the first commercial bank in the Russian Far East.

Dalcombank shareholders were:

- Machine manufacturing plant
- Ordjonikidze oil processing company
- Khabarovsk region cash collection company
- “Dalenergomash” plant
- Savings Bank of USSR, Khabarovsk region
- “Promzoloto” company
- “Dallesprom” company

From 1994 till 2004 Dalcombank was authorized dealer of Khabarovsk Territory Administration at budget execution.

1997 – Dalcombank was joined with another regional bank named HAKObank

Since 2006 Dalcombank had been serving the subventions, which were apportioned to young families for gaining habitation within the limits of subprogramme “Providing young families with habitation” of federal purpose program “Habitation”.

In 2008 within the limits of realization of program in state supporting of debtors fell within complicated living situation Dalcombank became an official agent of OJSC “Mortgage Credits Restructuring Agency” in the Far Eastern Federal District

== Owners and supervision ==
Dalcombank along with the Moscow Bank for Reconstruction and Development (MBRD) and East-West United Bank (EWUB) were included in the bank group of Russian conglomerate company Sistema. In August 2007 the corporation purchased 20% of Dalcombank shares. In October 2007 it increased its ownership to 48.2% and in January 2008 to 98.6% as a result of public offer to Dalcombank shareholders. On August 14, 2008, Sistema increased in the Joint Stock Company “Dalcombank” from 98.65% to 100% of the company's share capital.

Since its establishing up to its take over by MTS Bank, Anrey Shlyakhovoi was the President and Chairman of the board.

== Business foundations ==
On June 1, 2009, its branch network included 80 outlets in 8 regions of the Russian Federation: Amurskiy, Irkutsk, Jewish Autonomous, Primorskiy, Khabarovsk regions, Sakha republic and 34 other towns and settlements.

Developing Bank's infrastructure expanded and the bank was reviewed by RBC-rating as being in the Top-100 of largest Russian banks with most developed branch network in 2008 at 51st place.

Dalcombank had been participant and was a leader of cashless transactions of the national payment system “Golden Crown” (from 1998) and participant of international payment systems Visa and MasterCard.

The Bank was recognised by “Banking” magazine's prize and nomination as “Best Regional Bank”, owner of Long-term issuer default (IDR) at “B+”, Short-term IDR “B”, Individual “E”, Support “4”, National Long-term “A- (A minus)(rus)” (of Fitch Ratings), and “B++” “Acceptable level of solvency with positive prospects” (of rating agency “Expert RA”).

== Financial position ==
As of 2010, Dalcombank took 55th place by the volume of the deposits to individuals in the list of largest Russian banks according to the center of the economic analysis “Interfax”. RBC-rating included Dalcombank on 99th position in TOP-500 among most profitable banks in “Most profitable and efficient banks of Russia of 2008” rating.
