= Mints Radiotechnical Institute =

Soviet-Russian research institute

Coordinates: 55°48′13″N 37°33′10″E

- Native name: Радиотехнический институт имени академика А. Л. Минца
- Type: Open joint-stock company
- Industry: Defense, telecommunications
- Founded: August 13, 1946
- Headquarters: Moscow, Russia
- Parent: RTI Systems (Sistema)
- Website: www.niidar.ru

The Mints Radiotechnical Institute (Russian: Радиотехнический институт имени академика А. Л. Минца) is a Russian enterprise conducting research in the field of radar and telecommunications. It is a developer of ground-based over-the-horizon radar systems for missile and space defense, as well as control lines and functional interaction of radars with aerospace strike systems of high-precision weapons. It was founded on August 13, 1946.

== History ==
The creation of RTI is closely associated with the name of Aleksandr Mints. In 1930, he organized the first television laboratory in the USSR, and in 1938, in a few months, he built the most powerful shortwave radio station in the world, the RV-96 (120 kW), according to a project he had developed. During the war, under his leadership, a medium-wave broadcasting radio station was created with a fantastic power for that time - 1200 kW, the transmissions of which could be received in the occupied territory. For this work, Mints became a laureate of the first degree Stalin Prize.

=== Accelerator topics ===
On August 13, 1946, Laboratory No. 11 was organized as part of the Physical Institute of the USSR Academy of Sciences (FIAN) to solve scientific and engineering problems related to the creation of charged particle accelerators for the Soviet atomic bomb project. It was located in Moscow, in a separate building at 1-ya Frunzenskaya Street, Building 3A. Corresponding Member of the USSR Academy of Sciences, Colonel Engineer Aleksandr Mints was appointed Head of the Laboratory. The first task of the laboratory was to develop one of the main elements of accelerators - powerful generators of high-frequency electromagnetic oscillations. In April 1947, Mints's team, as the "Department of Radio Equipment" (ORLIP), was transferred to the Laboratory of Measuring Instruments of the USSR Academy of Sciences headed by academician Igor Kurchatov. In December 1949, the largest proton accelerator at that time was launched.

In 1976, the divisions involved in the creation of accelerator equipment were separated from RTI and formed the Moscow Radio Engineering Institute (MRTI).

=== Radar Themes ===
In February 1951, to conduct top-secret work on the creation of anti-missile defense systems, Mints's team was transferred to the Third Main Directorate as an independent Radio Engineering Laboratory of the USSR Academy of Sciences (RALAN). The laboratory's main developments include technological equipment, warning systems, target designation, control and communications for the S-25 anti-aircraft missile system

In 1954, work began on creating large ground-based radar stations for anti-missile defense. In 1957, the laboratory was transformed into the Radio Engineering Institute of the USSR Academy of Sciences (RTI USSR Academy of Sciences) as part of the Ministry of Medium Machine-Building. Aleksandr Mints was appointed director of RTI. Under the auspices of the Ministry of Medium Machine Building, the institute carried out work on accelerator topics (proton synchrotron, proton accelerator), and under the auspices of the Ministry of Radio Industry, on radar (radars for early warning and control systems, missile defense systems, air defense systems and missile defense systems).

In 1960, the development of the Dniester radar began, on the basis of which the SKKP radar nodes were later created in the Arctic, Latvian SSR, Kazakh SSR and Siberia. The institute was transferred to the Ministry of Radio Industry and moved to a new complex of buildings on 8 Marta Street, built on the territory previously occupied by the Faculty of Animal Husbandry of the Timiryazev Agricultural Academy. The expansion allowed the institute to significantly replenish its staff. Many graduates from Moscow State University, MEPhI, MAI, and MPEI came, studying in such specialties as systems engineering, computational mathematics, and control theory. The average age of employees was no more than 35 years.

In 1968, the Dnepr radar was developed, which implemented more advanced signal processing methods. On its basis, radar units of the early warning system were built on the Kola Peninsula, in Transcarpathia, Crimea, Latvian SSR, Kazakh SSR, and Siberia. Fundamentally new capabilities were incorporated into the Daugava radar, on the basis of which the high-potential Daryal radar was developed in the 1970s.

Radar "Don-2N" under construction In the early 1990s, the multifunctional radar "Don-2N" developed by the institute, distinguished by increased energy, accuracy and resolution, was put on duty. It became the information core of the currently operating missile defense system of the central industrial region of Russia (A-135).

In subsequent years, the institute continued to increase its potential for creating powerful ultra-long-range radars, while simultaneously mastering the problems of new areas in the areas of communication systems, telecommunications, ground-space location, etc.

In 1985, RTI was named after Academician Aleksandr Mints

In 2000, RTI became part of the JSC "Concern "RTI Systems". As of 2011, the concern owns 83.27% of the institute's shares

As of 2014, JSC Mints Radiotechnical Institute is part of JSC Concern RTI Systems, the main shareholder of which is the holding company JSC RTI (CEO P. S. Laptayev). The shareholders of JSC RTI, in turn, are AFK Sistema (84.6%) and Bank of Moscow (15.4%).

Due to Russia's invasion of Ukraine, the enterprise is under sanctions from all EU countries, the US, Ukraine and Japan.
