= Evgeny Novitsky =

Former AFK Sistema President

Evgeny Grigorievich Novitsky
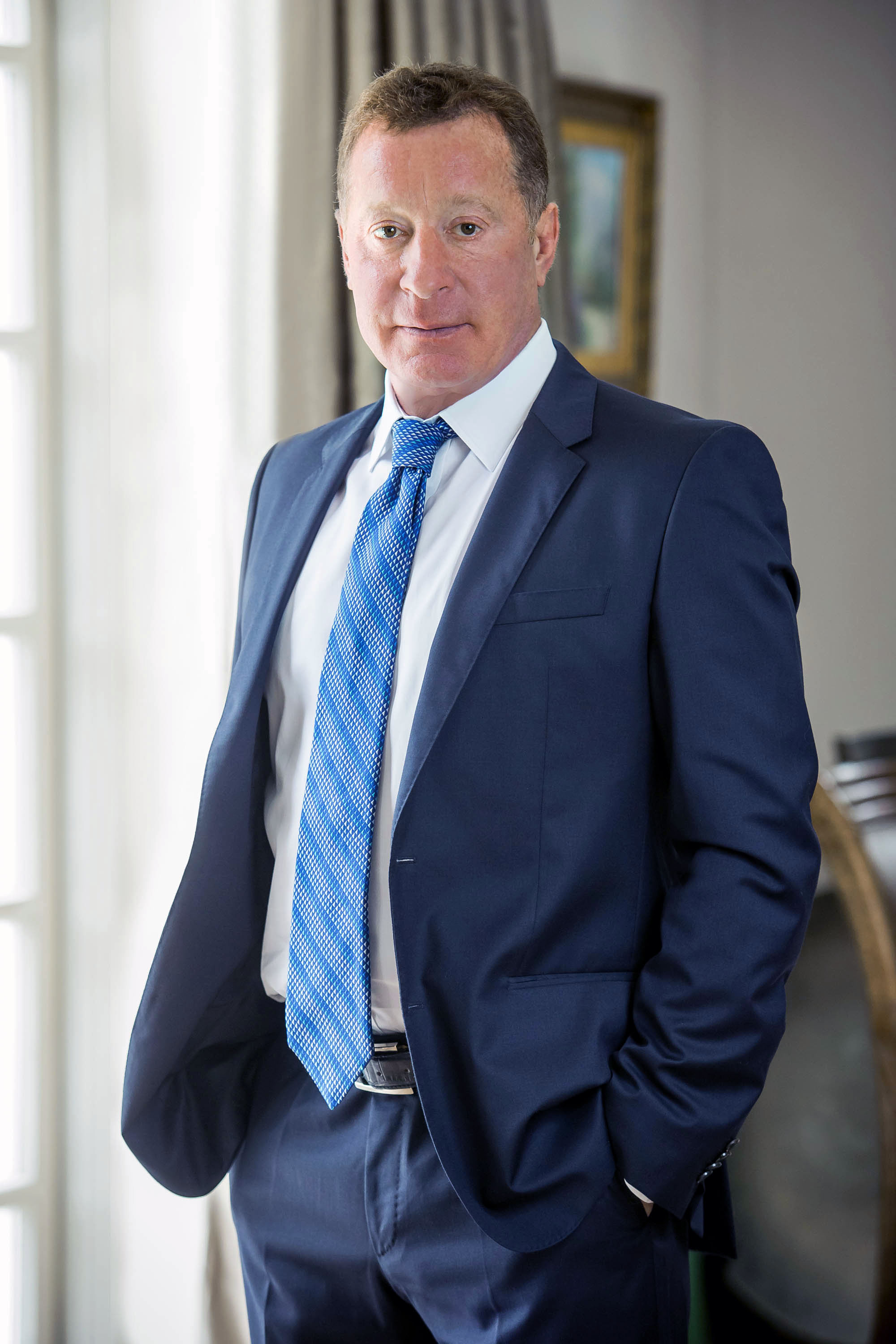
- Born: 19 November 1957 (age 68); Tomsk Oblast, Soviet Union
- Education: Bauman Moscow State Technical University
- Occupation: Business executive
- Known for: Former president of AFK Sistema, scientist at Bauman University, leader of RTI Systems
- Children: 6

Evgeny Grigorievich Novitsky (Russian: Евге́ний Григо́рьевич Нови́цкий) is a Russian engineer and entrepreneur, former president of the large AFK Sistema conglomerate which holds many diversified businesses.

He is the chairman of the trustee board of the Bauman Moscow State Technical University, which he graduated from in 1985. He is also one of the chairmen of the electronics production company RTI Systems.

== Early life and education ==
Evgeny Novitsky was born on 19 November 1957 in Tomsk Oblast.

He graduated from Bauman Moscow State Technical University in 1985 as an engineer in manufacturing of aircraft. He worked at the university as engineer mathematician and postgraduate until 1990, while working on various scientific projects for Russian defense industry. He has a degree of Candidate of Technical Sciences. In 1989 and 1990 he also studied management at Russian MGIMO Institute and UK's Manchester Business School.

== Career ==
From 1991 to 1995 Novitsky headed a production team working to produce Personal Computers at Kvant factory in Zelenograd (both assembling PCs from parts and creation of authentic Russian PCs).

In 1995 he became one of the leaders (together with Vladimir Yevtushenkov) of the newly created AFK Sistema holding company (also known as Sistema JSFC) which incorporates various businesses, among most known of them MTS—one of the Russia's largest cell phone networks. From 1995 to 2005 he served as Sistema's president, from 2005 to 2006—as chairman at the board of directors. From 2006 to 2013 he was a member of the board, and from 2011 to 2013 an independent director. Novitsky is responsible for Sistema's general development in these years—in particular, according to strategic plan created jointly by Novitsky and Deloitte & Touche, which included the IPO procedure.

Since 2013, Evgeny Novitsky serves as one of the leaders of the electronics production company RTI Systems—as chairman and vice chairman of the board of directors. The company was created jointly by Sistema and Bank of Moscow and is specialized in production of hi-tech equipment (primarily radio electronics) for defense and business purposes. In 2017, RTI Systems was listed the 86th in the Defense News Top 100 ranking by Defense News.

Novitsky was the chairman of the Board of Directors of IVC, a Russian company operating in the field of information technology. He is the author of a monograph and a number of publications for them.

Since 2018, he has served as Deputy General Director of PJSC PhosAgro.

In 2011–2016, Yevgeny Novitsky was engaged in business on non-state pension funds. As of April 1, 2016 amounted to 31.1 billion rubles, including pension reserves - 7.28 billion rubles, pension savings - 17.53 billion rubles.

In the 2010s, Novitsky announced a project in the area of cryptocurrencies and blockchain—together with Imperial College London.

The Lang Capital Fund, which earned nearly 12m Singaporean Dollars in 2017 is alleged to have been financed by Novitsky, but Novitsky and others have denied this.

Novitsky has been alleged to be an associate and treasurer of Russia's Solntsevo crime group. Novitsky has denied the accusations.

== Sanctions ==
He was sanctioned by New Zealand in relation to the 2022 Russian invasion of Ukraine. This was followed by sanctions from the Japanese government on July 5, 2022.

== Personal life ==
He has 6 children.
