= Aleksandr Mints =

Soviet physicist (1894–1974)

- Александр Львович Минц
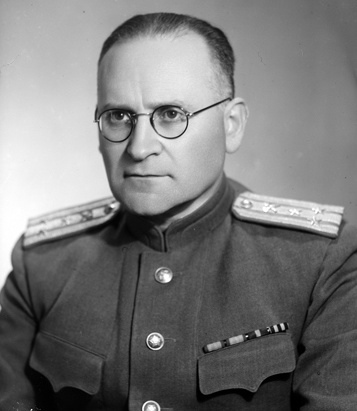
- Born: 14 May 1908; Rostov-on-Don, Russian Empire
- Died: 29 December 1974 (aged 79); Moscow
- Education: Don University
- Known for: Creator of Synchrophasotron, radar systems, Missile defense systems, and Early-warning radar
- Awards: Hero of Socialist Labour, Order of Lenin, Order of the Red Banner of Labour, Order of the Red Star, Medal "For Valiant Labour in the Great Patriotic War 1941–1945", Medal "In Commemoration of the 800th Anniversary of Moscow", Jubilee Medal "In Commemoration of the 100th Anniversary of the Birth of Vladimir Ilyich Lenin", Lenin Prize, Stalin Prize
- Scientific career
- Fields: Radio astronomy
- Workplaces: Mints Radiotechnical Institute

Alexander Lvovich Mints (Russian: Александр Львович Минц; December 27, 1894 [January 8, 1895], Rostov-on-Don - 29 December 1974, Moscow) was a Soviet radiophysicist, engineer and organizer of science who was known for being a developer of communication and radar systems. He was one of the creators of the long-range detection radar and the Soviet synchrophasotron in Joint Institute for Nuclear Research in Dubna. He held the rank of Engineer-Colonel (from October 17, 1944).

== Biography ==
Born on December 27, 1894 (January 8, 1895) in the family of a Rostov manufacturer, he was interested in chemistry and aircraft modeling.

In 1913 he graduated with a gold medal from the 2nd Rostov Gymnasium N.P. Stepanov. In 1915, he entered the Faculty of Physics and Mathematics of Don University, the next year - immediately into the second year of Moscow University and at the same time into the Shanyavsky Moscow City People's University, where the physics course was taught by the future academician Petr Lazarev. He invited the capable student to begin scientific work in his laboratory. On September 30, 1916, Mintz announced his first invention - "A system for paralyzing the operation of an enemy radio station", based on the use of frequency modulation.

In 1918 he graduated from Don University.

In 1920, units of the 1st Cavalry Army entered Rostov-on-Don. The Mintsev family, fearing reprisals, hastily left the city, but Alexander flatly refused to leave. He tried to resist the expropriation of his father's house and was arrested and awaited execution. However, he managed to interest the Soviet regime in the idea of using radio communications in the cavalry army. He was not only released, but also appointed commander of a new unit - the radio division. Mints was subordinate to 13 radio stations and 125 people.

In 1921, the 1st Cavalry Army was disbanded. Mints was sent to Moscow, to the Higher Military School of Communications of the Red Army, where he worked as head of the radio department and head of the radio laboratory. Under the scientific guidance of the prominent radio specialist Mikhail Vasilyevich Shuleikin, Mints conducted research on the propagation of short waves, and also worked on the transfer of military radio communications from spark radio stations to tube radio stations. In 1922, he created the country's first army tube radiotelegraph station, which was put into service in 1923 under the symbol "ALM" (Alexander Lvovich Mints). It was manufactured in the amount of 220 sets and was used until the start of the Great Patriotic War. By 1928, spark radio stations were removed from supply to the Red Army.

In August 1923, Mints was appointed head of the Scientific Testing Institute of the Military-Technical Council of Army Communications (SRI VTSS RKKA (Russian: НИИ ВТСС РККА)), created in April of the same year on the basis of the Military Radio Engineering Laboratory (VRTL). Under his leadership, the first radio broadcasts of concerts, operas and performances from theater halls, as well as newsreels from streets and squares, were carried out. While studying room acoustics, he proposed a method for mixing the signal from several microphones. Mints actively supported radio amateurs - he led radio circles, gave consultations, under the pseudonym "A. Modulator" wrote articles for popular science magazines.

In 1928, when, on the initiative of Sergo Ordzhonikidze, the construction of powerful radio broadcasting stations was underway in the country, a small group of specialists under the leadership of Mints was transferred to Leningrad, receiving independent status as the "Bureau of Powerful Radio Construction". This team became the basis of the "Powerful Radio Construction Plant named after the Comintern", which included several factories, as well as scientific, design and installation organizations. In the fall of 1929, the 100 kW Radio Station named after the All-Union Central Council of Trade Unions, designed here, made the USSR one of the world leaders in radio construction. Foreign specialists came to learn the experience of building powerful radio stations.

While working in Leningrad, Mintz became interested in radar, as well as the development of television equipment. In 1930, he organized the first television laboratory in the USSR.

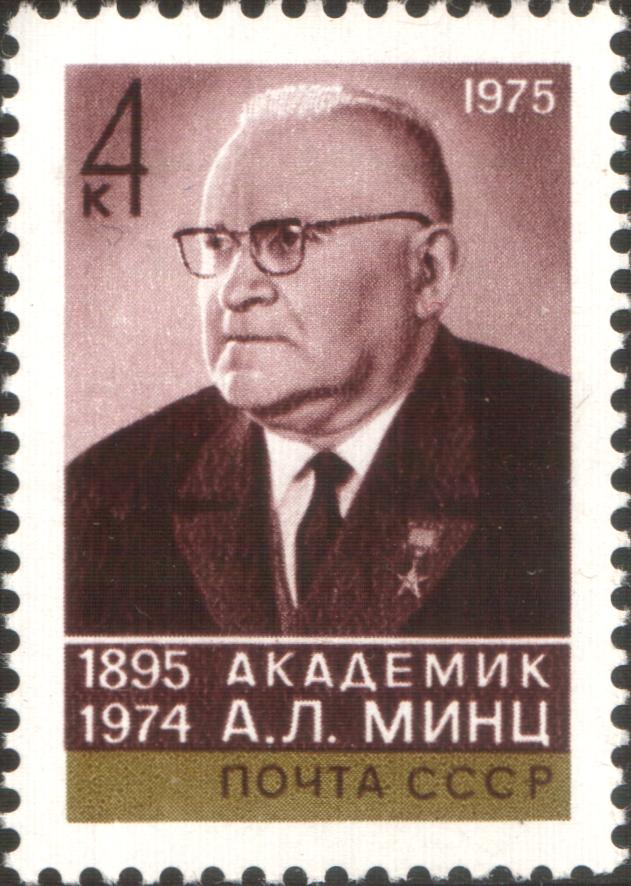
Postal stamp honouring Mints issued in 1975

In February 1931, the head of the department of radio transmitting devices of the Central Radio Laboratory, Mints, along with six scientists, was arrested on charges of “sabotage work in the field of radio communications of the Red Army.” On June 6, 1931, Mints was sentenced to 5 years in prison. But already on July 18 of the same year, by a resolution of the OGPU board, he was released - a decision was made to build a new long-wave radio broadcasting station with a then unheard-of power of 500 kW (at that time the largest radio transmitter in Europe had a power of 120 kW, in the USA - 50 kW).

In 1932, Mintz graduated from the Moscow Communications Training Center as an external student and received a patent for a device for interstitial image scanning, the principle of which became the basis of the interlaced scanning system. Under his leadership, Anton Breitbart developed an industrial complex of television equipment - a mechanical television with an image size of 27x27 cm and a clarity of 1200 resolution elements (30 lines at 12.5 frames per second), a transmitter with a frequency band of 14 kHz and studio equipment.

In 1937, the Radio Station "RV-87" named after Kosior (150 kW) was launched, in 1938 - the shortwave Radio Station "RV-96" (120 kW).

On May 7, 1938, shortly after returning from a business trip to the United States, the chief engineer of NII-33 of the People's Commissariat of Defense Industry, Mints, was arrested again, now on charges of participating in an "anti-Soviet right-wing Trotskyist organization, on whose instructions he carried out sabotage work at the plant No. 208 and was engaged in espionage in favor of one of the foreign states". While under investigation, Mints continued to work in the "Department of Special Design Bureaus of the NKVD of the USSR". On May 28, 1940, the military collegium of the Supreme Court of the USSR sentenced Mints in absentia to 10 years in the camps. On July 10, 1941, he was released by personal order of Josef Stalin as the war began, and in Kuibyshev it was decided to create a medium wave radio broadcasting station with a powerful for those times - 1200 kW, the transmissions of which could be received in the occupied territory. This station began operating in 1942.

Since 1946 he was a corresponding Member of the Academy of Sciences of the Soviet Union. In the same year, to solve scientific and engineering problems within the framework of the Soviet atomic project, which was supervised by Lavrentiy Beria, Laboratory No. 11 was organized as part of the Lebedev Physical Institute (from 1947 - as part of LIPAN). Mints was appointed head of the laboratory. His employees were tasked with developing wide-range microwave generators for electron and proton accelerators, controlled thermonuclear fusion installations and radiophysical installations for applied purposes.

In the 1950s, work began on large ground-based radar stations for space control, missile early warning, and missile defense systems. In 1956, by the Decree of the Central Committee of the CPSU and the Council of Ministers of the Soviet Union "On Missile Defense", Mints was appointed one of the main designers of the long-range detection radar. In 1957, his laboratory was transformed into an independent Radio Engineering Institute of the Academy of Sciences of the Soviet Union.

In 1956 he was rehabilitated in the second case, in 1958 in the first.

He died on December 29, 1974, and was buried at the Novodevichy Cemetery (plot No. 7) in Moscow.
