= Lenin Square, Khabarovsk =

Square in Khabarovsk, Russia

Lenin Square
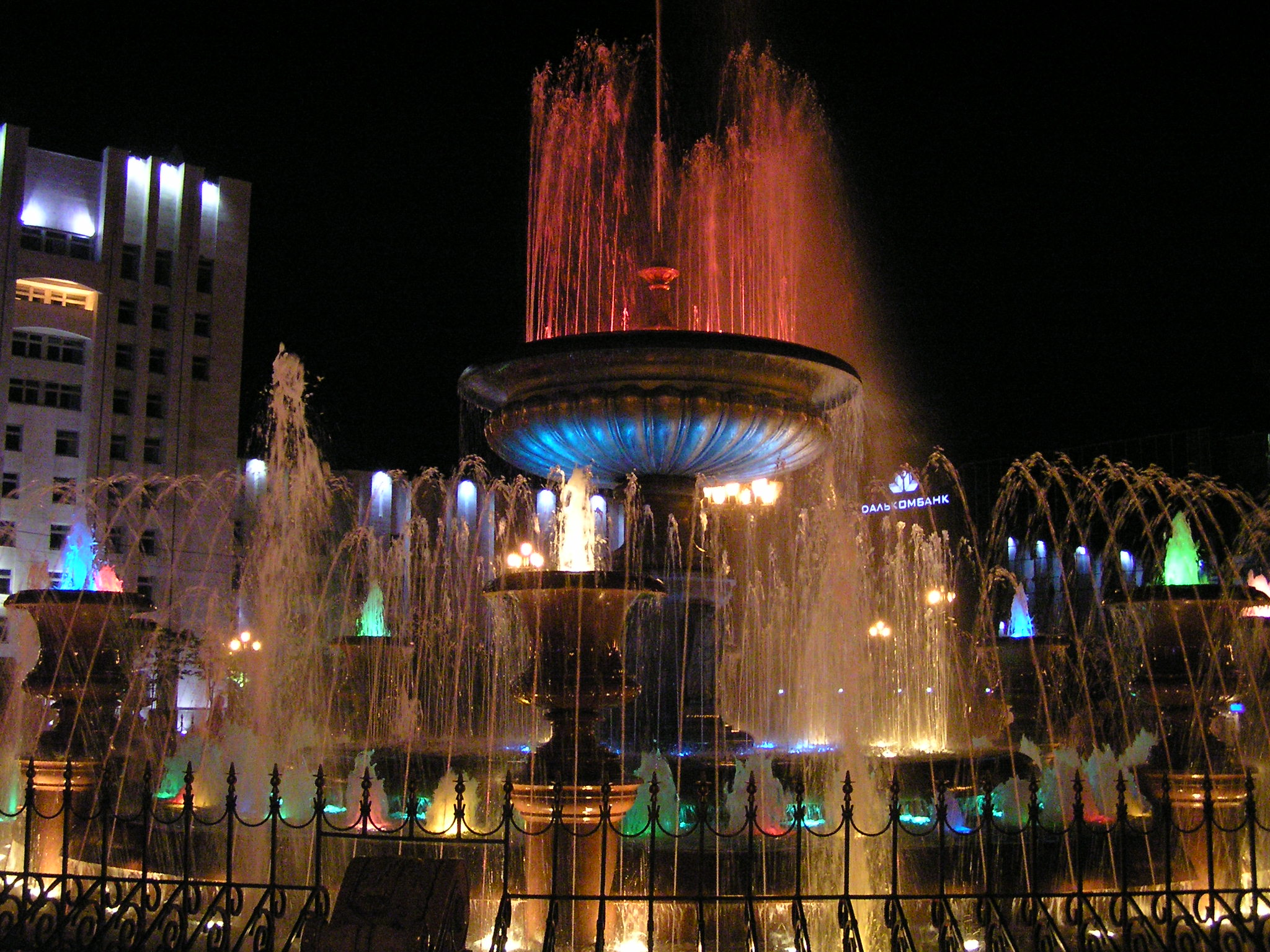
- Interactive map of Lenin Square
- Native name: Площадь Ленина (Russian)
- Former names: Nikolaevskaya Square (1864); Freedom Square (1917); Stalin Square (1950)
- Type: Public square
- Location: Khabarovsk, Russia
- Coordinates: 48°28′48″N 135°4′18″E

Construction
- Construction start: 1864
- Completed: 1998

Lenin Square (Russian: Площадь Ленина) is a square in Khabarovsk, Russia. It is the second biggest square in Russia next to Moscow's Red Square. It is located in the Central District and intersects with Gogolya Street, Turgyeneva Street, Karl Marx Street, and Glory Square, Muravyova-Amurskogo Street. Itbos currently the location for main city events and celebrations.

== History ==
It was created in 1864 as Nikolaevskaya Square. In 1917, it was renamed Freedom Square. In 1925, a monument to Vladimir Lenin was placed in the center of the square. In 1949, architect E. Mameshin developed a project for the planning and development of the square which included a modern medical university. In 1950, it was renamed Stalin Square and began to host International Workers' Day and October Revolution Day civil/military parades for the first time. In 1957 the square was renamed Lenin square. In 1998 the square underwent a final reconstruction. In 2010, a memorial marker for the "Zero kilometer of the Chita-Khabarovsk Federal Highway" was installed in Lenin Square marking the final completion of the 40-year construction project in the Amur Highway.

In 2021, during the national protests in Russia around 1,000 protesters gathered on Lenin Square in support of both Russian opposition leader Alexei Navalny and the arrested former governor Sergey Furgal before police dispersed the crowd and detained participants.

== Notable buildings ==
The architectural appearance of the building area is diverse, with different buildings including:

- Far Eastern State Medical University
- Far East Institute of Management
- Dalcombank Headquarters
- Government of the Khabarovsk Krai (known as the White House)
- Junker College
- Central Hotel

The entire square and its architectural structures is 25,300 square metres (272,000 sq ft) meters in size.

== Lenin statue ==
After the establishment of Soviet power in the Russian Far East, local newspapers suggested that a monument to Vladimir Lenin be erected in Khabarovsk on the anniversary of his death (22 January) in 1925. The process of construction began under the direction of People's Artist of the RSFSR M. Manizer from Moscow. The height of the monument together with the pedestal was 6.67 meters, with three bronze plaques with quotes from Lenin being fixed onto the pedestal. During its first reconstruction in 1950, the monument was moved from the center of the square to the building of the former school, making stands on either side. In the 1990s, attempts were made to remove the monument, however was completely ignored by the local government.

== Gallery ==
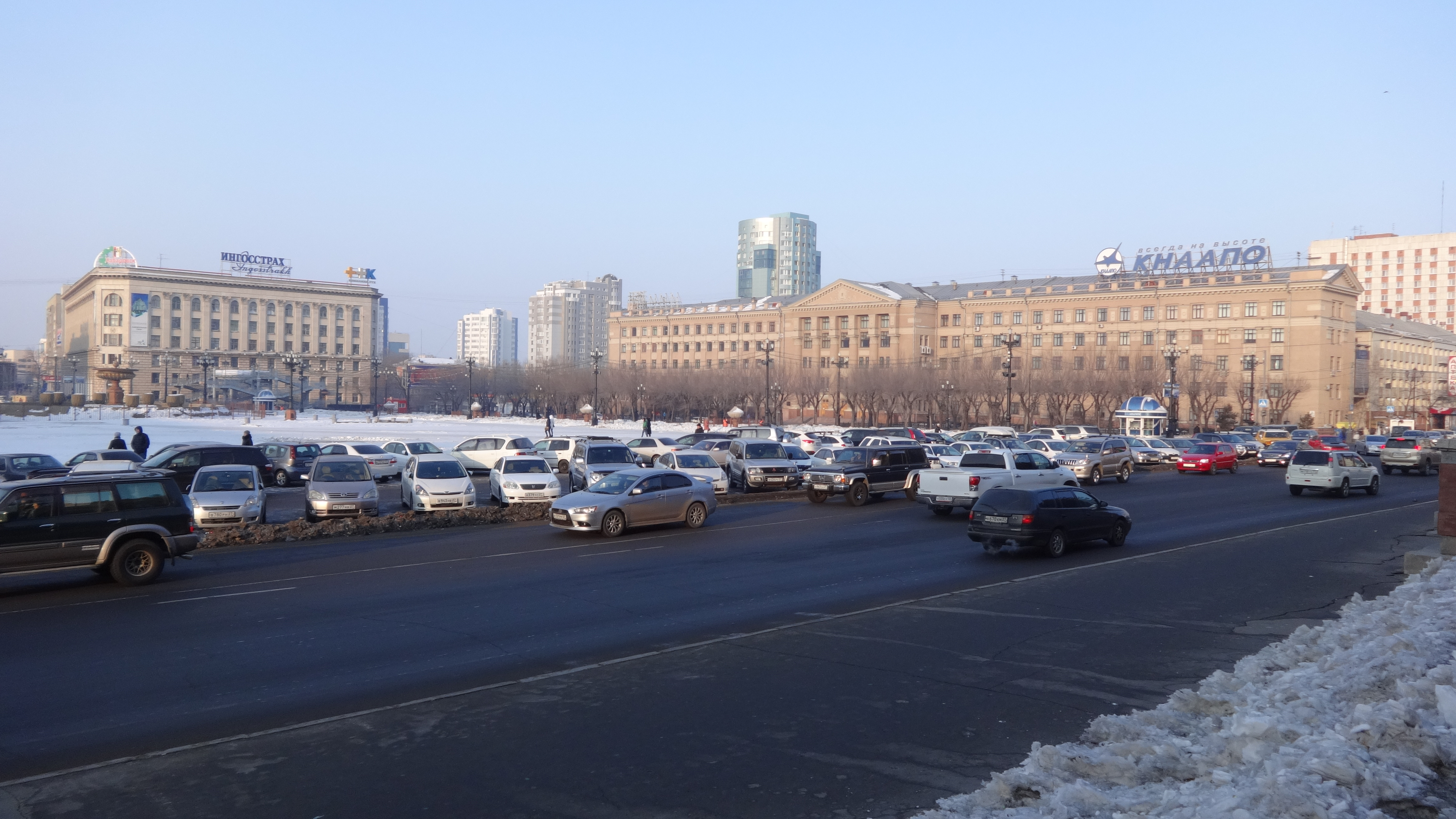

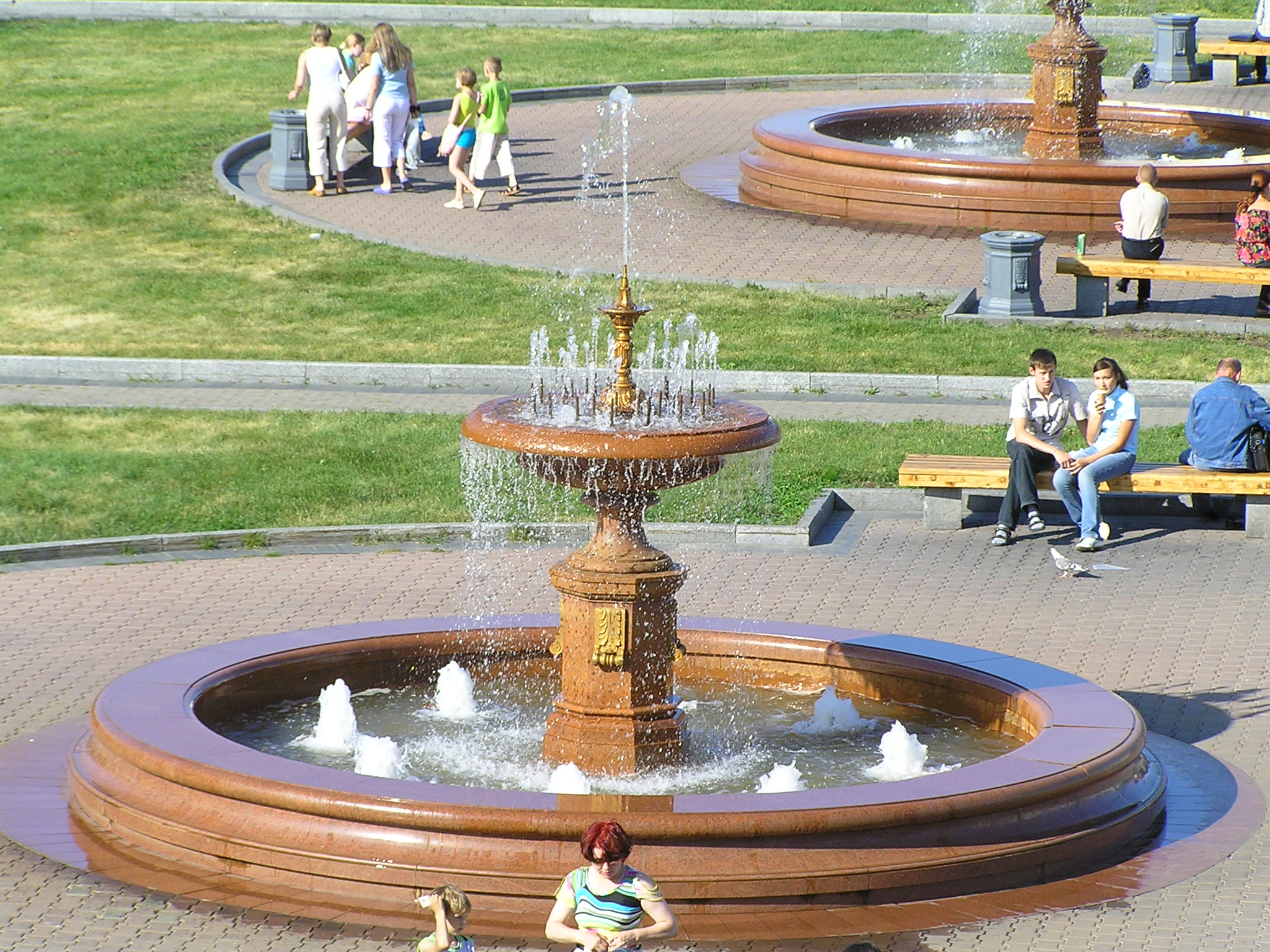

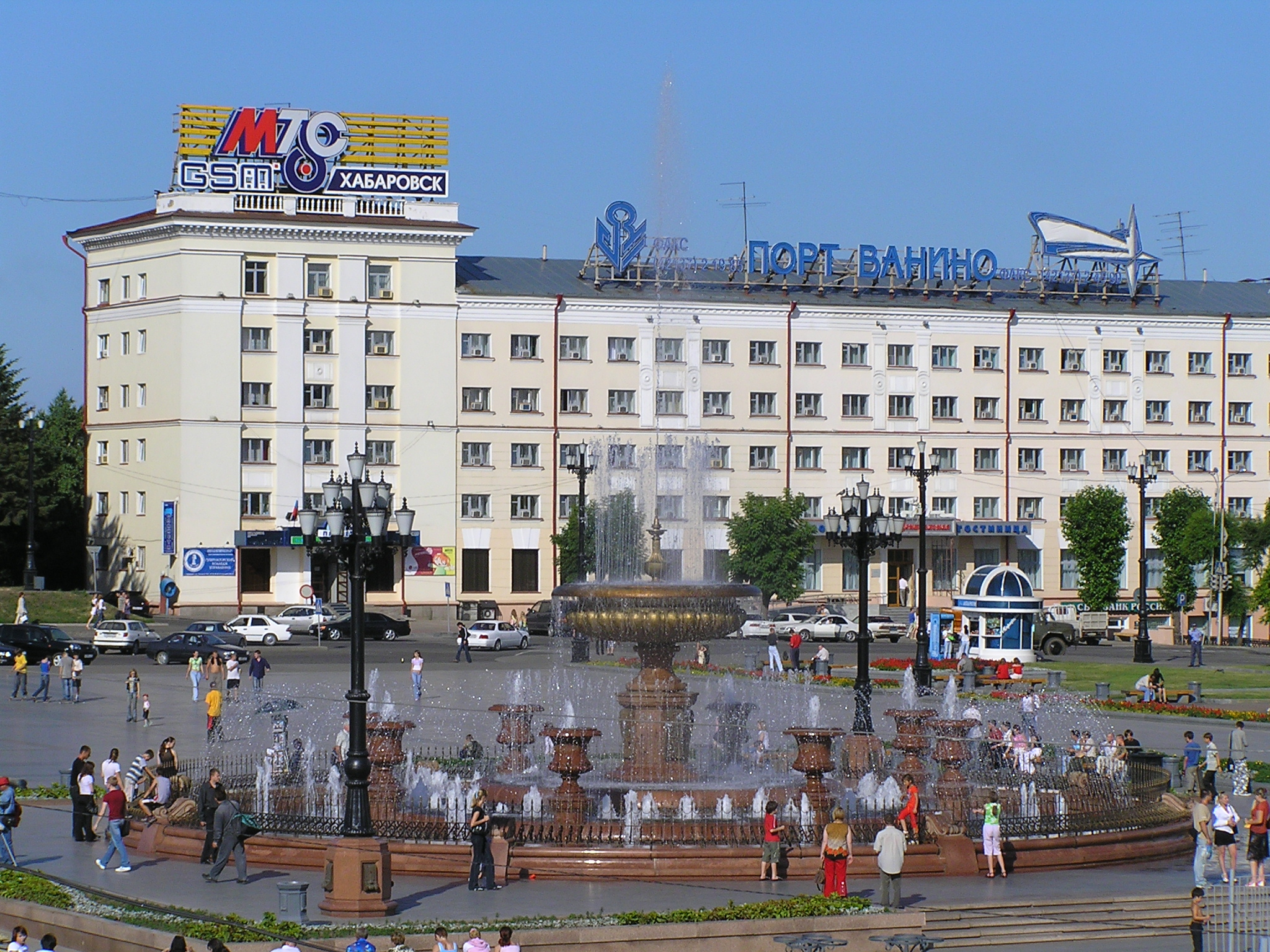

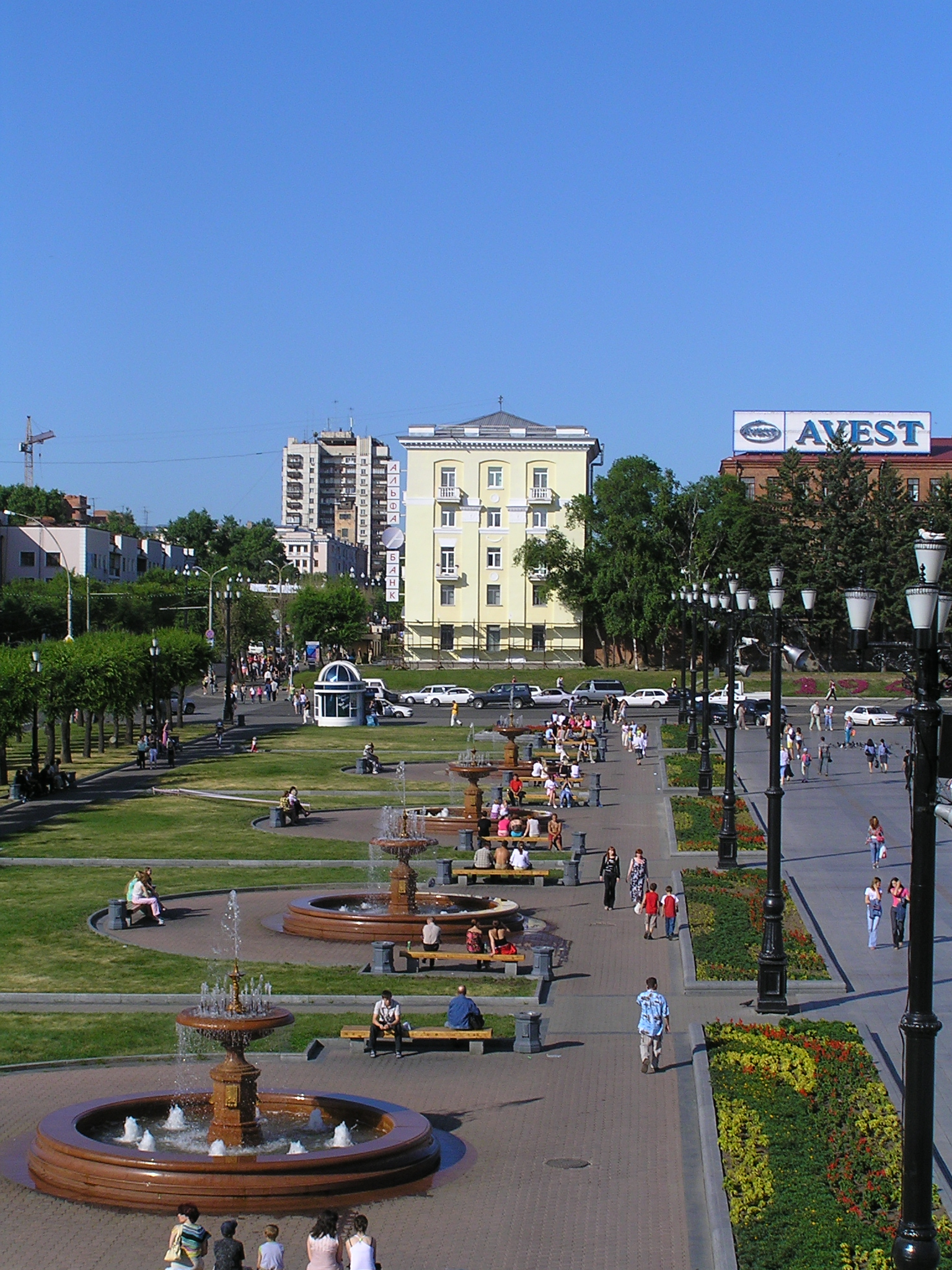

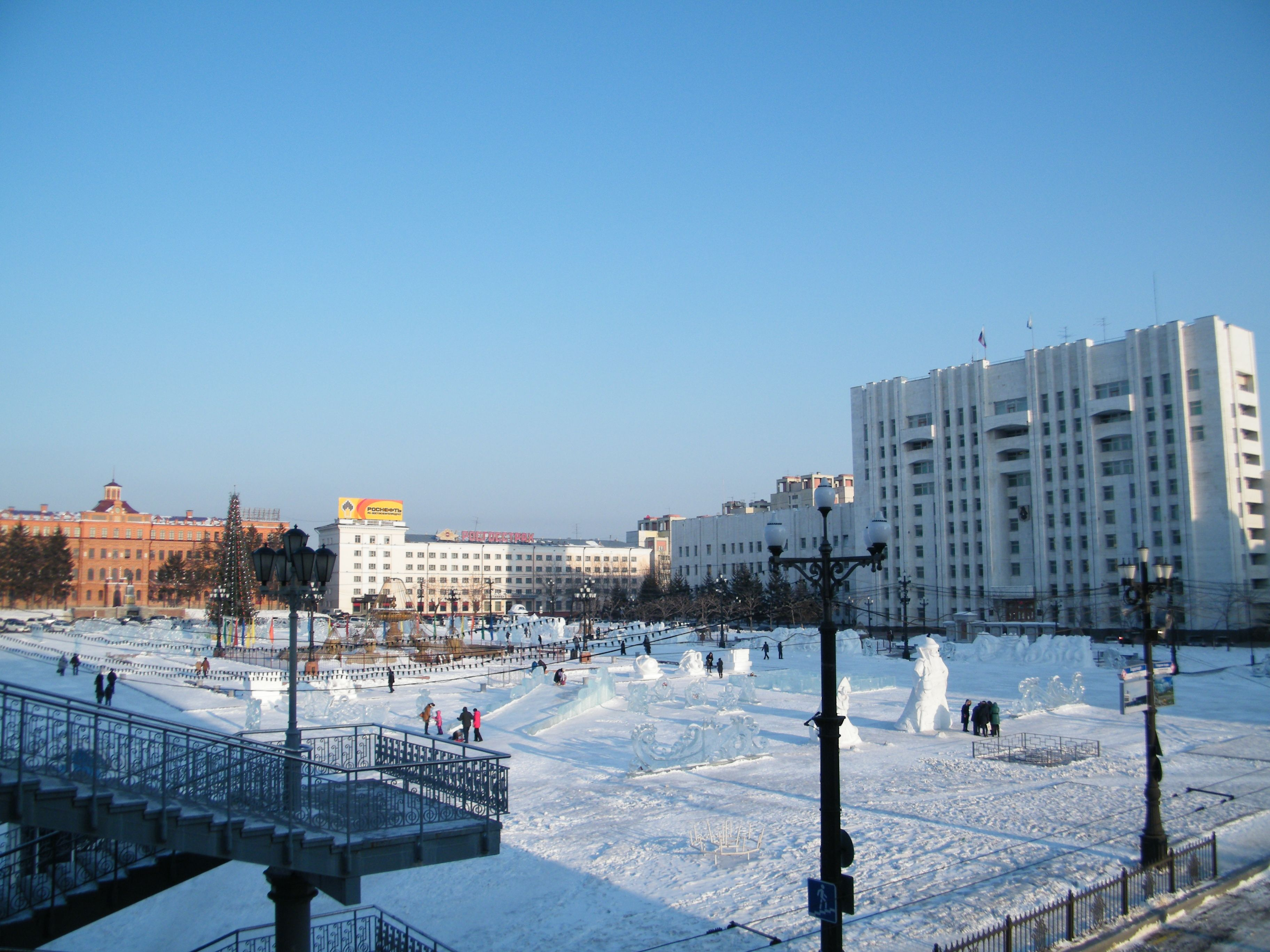

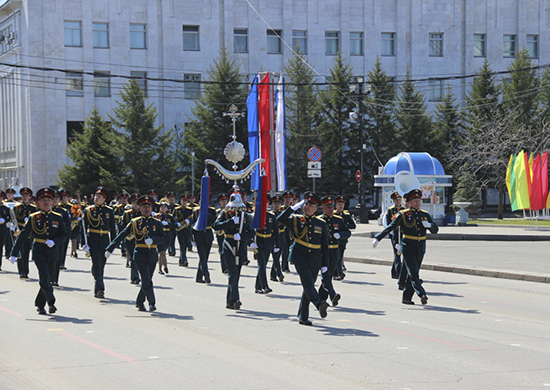

== See also ==
- List of things named after Vladimir Lenin
