= RTI Systems =

Defence contractor in Russia

RTI Systems logo

RTI Systems (Radio Technical and Information Systems; Russian: РТИ Системы) is one of the largest defense contractors in Russia, with revenues for $753.5 million in 2016. RTI develops and produces long-horizon radars, information tools, rocket technology, integrated communication, and safety systems.

The Russian Ministry of Defense is the company's main customer. RTI also collaborates with Rosoboronexport to market its products abroad. In 2015 the company launched a project to develop the communications and broadcasting infrastructure of the Russian Arctic region. In 2017 the company was hit by sanctions from the US State Department.

== Subsidiaries ==
Subsidiaries of the company:

- Mints Radiotechnical Institute (RTI Mints) - air defence radars including the Dnestr and Voronezh systems. Formerly headed by, and now named after, Soviet scientist Alexander Lvovich Mints.
- OKB - Planeta
- Saransk Television Plant
- ROSS.SPETSTEHMONTAZH
- Radio Engineering And Information Systems Aerospace Defense
- Yaroslavl Radio Plant - radio communications systems for military and civilian applications
- Dubna Machine-Building Plant N.P. Fedorova
- RTI-Radio
- Sistema - Sarov
- MTU Saturn
- High Technologies And Strategic Systems
- CENTER - TELCO
- Center for Advanced Design Vympel - Sistema
- Mednogorsk Electrotechnical Plant of Uralelectro
- MATERIK
- Uralinstrument
- UralElyektro
- SPLAV-DMZ
- ELION
- Scientific Research Institute of Precision Engineering
- Sitronics - microelectronics and telecommunications
- Mikron Group - semiconductors, integrated circuits, and microprocessors
- Research Institute of Molecular Electronics
- Klen
- RTI Mikroelektronika
- Mikron Security Printing
- Konnektor Optiks
- Lasertech
- IKAR Engineering Center
