= Shpolskii matrix =

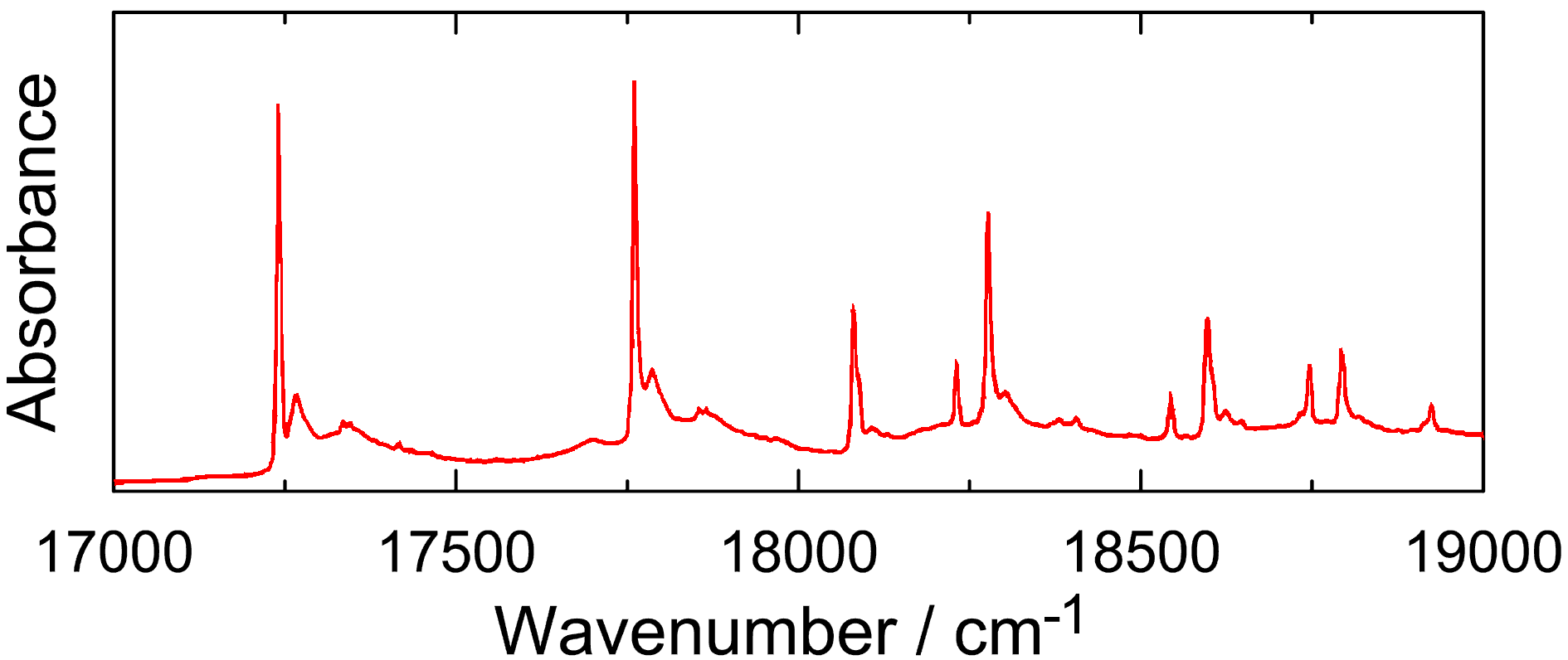
Figure 1. Absorption spectrum of dimethyl-s-tetrazene in n-heptane at 4.2 K. The sharp lines are characteristic of Shpolskii matrix spectra. Data adapted from Gebhardt et al.^{10}

Shpolskii systems are low-temperature host–guest systems – they are typically rapidly frozen solutions of polycyclic aromatic hydrocarbons in suitable low molecular weight normal alkanes. The emission and absorption spectra of lowest energy electronic transitions in the Shpolskii systems exhibit narrow lines instead of the inhomogeneously broadened features normally associated with spectra of chromophores in liquids and amorphous solids. The effect was first described by Eduard Shpolskii in the 1950s and 1960's in the journals Transactions of the U.S.S.R. Academy of Sciences and Soviet Physics Uspekhi.

Subsequent detailed studies of concentration and speed of cooling behavior of Shpolskii systems by L. A. Nakhimovsky and coauthors led to a hypothesis that these systems are metastable segregational solid solutions formed when one or more chromophores replace two or more molecules in the host crystalline lattice. The solid state quasi-equilibrium solubility in most Shpolskii systems is very low. When the Shpolskii effect is manifested, the solid state solubility increases two to three orders of magnitude. Isothermic annealing of the supersaturated rapidly frozen solutions of dibenzofuran in heptane was performed, and it was shown that the return of the metastable system to equilibrium in time reasonable for laboratory observation required the annealing temperature to be close to the melting temperature of the metastable frozen solution. Thus the Shpolskii systems are an example of a persistent metastable state.

A good match between the chromophore and the host lattice leads to a uniform environment for all the chromophores and hence greatly reduces the inhomogeneous broadening of the electronic transition's pure electronic and vibronic lines. In addition to the weak inhomogeneous broadening of the transitions, the quasi-lines observed at very low temperatures are phonon-less transitions. Since phonons originate in the lattice, an additional requirement is weak chromophore-lattice coupling. Weak coupling increases the probability of phonon-less transitions and hence favors the narrow zero phonon lines. The weak coupling is usually expressed in terms of the Debye-Waller factor, where a maximum value of one indicates no coupling between the chromophore and the lattice phonons. The narrow lines characteristic of the Shpolskii systems are only observed at cryogenic temperatures because at higher temperatures many phonons are active in the lattice and all of the amplitude of the transition shifts to the broad phonon sideband. The original observation of the Shpolskii effect was made at liquid nitrogen temperature (77 kelvins), but using temperatures close to that of liquid helium (4.2 K) yields much sharper spectral lines and is the usual practice.

Low molecular weight normal alkanes absorb light at energies higher than the absorption of all pi-pi electronic transitions of aromatic hydrocarbons. They interact weakly with the chromophores and crystallize when frozen. The length of the alkanes is often chosen to approximately match at least one of the dimensions of the chromophore, and are usually in the size range between n-pentane and n-dodecane.

== See also ==
- Zero-phonon line and phonon sideband
- Phonon
