= Petr Lazarev =

Russian biophysicist (1878–1942)

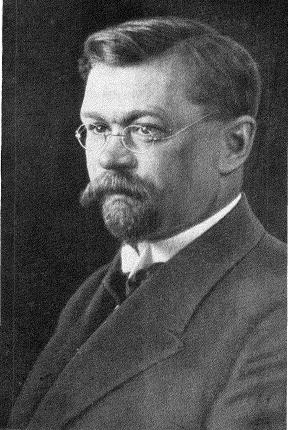
Petr Lazarev

Petr Petrovich Lazarev (Russian: Пётр Петрович Лазарев; 14 April 1878 – 24 April 1942) was a biophysicist and a founder of the Soviet Institute of Physics and Biophysics (now Lebedev Physical Institute). He also founded the journal Uspekhi fizicheskikh nauk (later Physics-Uspekhi).

== Early life ==
Lazarev was born in Moscow where his father worked as a civil engineer. After studies at a Moscow Gymnasium, he graduated from Moscow University in 1901 with a medical degree. After passing the examination to become a doctor of medicine in 1902 he worked at an ear clinic. He then became interested in mathematics and physics and passed the university examination in 1903 after studying the subjects entirely on his own.

== Career ==
Lazarev's early research was on hearing, and he noted that auditory sensations could be amplified by coordinated visual stimulation. He later studied other phenomena such as synesthesia and the effect of singing on vision. He began to collaborate with P.N. Lebedev from 1903, and in 1912, he obtained a doctorate with a thesis Vytsvetanie krasok i pigmentov v vidimom svete ["The Fading of Colors and Pigments in Visible Light"].

In 1911, he joined Lebedev in protest against the policies of L.A. Kasso and quit Moscow University to join Shanyavsky University. He began to study the ion theory of nerve excitation and confirmed Loeb's formula. During World War I, he was involved in producing medical equipment, including thermometers and mobile X-ray systems. After the 1917 revolution, he became a member of the Russian Academy of Sciences.

In 1918, he was involved in the study of the Kursk Magnetic Anomaly and worked on geomagnetism with E.G. Leyst.

== Arrest and exile ==
In 1929, a group of communists failed to be elected to the Soviet Academy of Sciences. Lazarev objected to re-balloting them. He also publicly criticized Friedrich Engels writings about $\sqrt{-1}$ (Imaginary unit) who said that is "not only a contradiction, but even an absurd contradiction, a real absurdity." As a result of this, Lazarev was arrested on 5 March 1931 and was removed from all of his academic positions. His institute was transferred to the Supreme Soviet of the National Economy, the key personnel were sacked and most of the equipment destroyed. Lazarev's wife committed suicide on 13 June 1931.

In September 1931 Lazarev was exiled to Sverdlovsk. He returned to Moscow in 1932. Aleksandr Mints was his student.
