= Irina Nurislamova =

Irina Nikolayevna Nurislamova (Russian: Ирина Николаевна Нурисламова) is a currently a judge of the Arbitration Court of the Republic of Bashkortostan, who became well-known in Bashneft case.

== Biography ==
At least from 2006, she was a judge of the magistrates' court for the Arkhangelsky district of Bashkortostan, where she mostly considered administrative cases.

Presumably, she had worked as a lawyer in Bashkortostan before that.

She was appointed to this position in October 2011.

The biggest lawsuits tried by I. Nurislamova as a judge of the Arbitration Court of the Republic of Bashkortostan are as follows:

Case	Claim amount	Case summary
А07-19762/2014	RUB 305m	Lawsuit filed by OJSC AF Bank against LLC Falkon for recovery of debt and interest under promissory notes. The Arbitration Court of the Republic of Bashkortostan rejected the claim in its ruling dated 25 August 2015.
А07-30760/2015	RUB 275m	A lawsuit for recovery of losses inflicted on the Duslyk Stroy housing development cooperative by its management. The Arbitration Court of the Republic of Bashkortostan satisfied the claim in its ruling dated 5 May 2016. An appeal is currently being considered, and Arbitration Court of Appeal No.18 has already ordered several expert opinions, so the ruling may be overturned.
А07-16324/2013	RUB 152m	Lawsuit filed by LLC Avangard against LLC Bashkir Fuel Company for termination of the leasing agreement, injunction to return the leased asset, and recovery of the cost of missing equipment, lost profits and penalty. Counter suit by LLC Bashkir Fuel Company against LLC Avangard for termination of the leasing agreement, recovery of the amount of difference in assets mutually provided under the leasing agreement, and recovery of losses caused by foreclosure. The Arbitration Court of the Republic of Bashkortostan satisfied the initial claims in its ruling dated 28 April 2016, ordering LLC Bashkir Fuel Company to pay the cost of missing equipment in the amount of RUB 44,527,820.42, the amount of actual losses, i.e. the paid tax amount (VAT at 18%) totalling RUB 9,806,743.22, lost profits in the amount of RUB 10,366,170.40 (w/o VAT), a fine of RUB 725,323.5 for failure to discharge its asset insurance obligations, and penalty in the amount of RUB 86,923,950.12.
А07-23313/2011	RUB 104m	Lawsuit filed by CJSC ROSTA against the state unitary enterprise Bashpharmacy for recovery of RUB 103,953,636.43. The Arbitration Court of the Republic of Bashkortostan approved a negotiated settlement agreement between the parties in its ruling dated 9 April 2012.

== Bashneft Case ==
Bashneft Case is a corporate conflict between the state-owned company Rosneft and the privately owned Russian company Sistema PJSFC. It is one of the most controversial corporate legal cases in the history of modern Russia.

On 15 May 2017, the Arbitration Court of Bashkortostan registered a RUB 106.6bn claim filed by Rosneft and Bashneft against Sistema, a preliminary hearing of the case was scheduled for 6 June, Irina Nurislamova was appointed as a judge for the case.

On 27 June, the Arbitration Court of Bashkortostan held the first hearing of the claim on the merits, during which it dismissed Sistema's motion to bring Rosimushchestvo to the case as a third party and scheduled the next hearing for 12 July. The court also ordered Sistema to produce evidence of the absence of losses from the restructuring of Bashneft and evidence of a positive economic effect from the restructuring, which, as noted by Sistema's lawyers in their objection, runs counter to the Supreme Court's explanation and the existing judicial practice, according to which “the 'burden of proof' lies with the claimants”.

On 19 July, after lodging complaints with a number of authorities, Sistema moved for judge recusal in the Rosneft case.
