= Vladimir Yevtushenkov =

Russian billionaire business oligarch (born 1948)

- Владимир Евтушенков
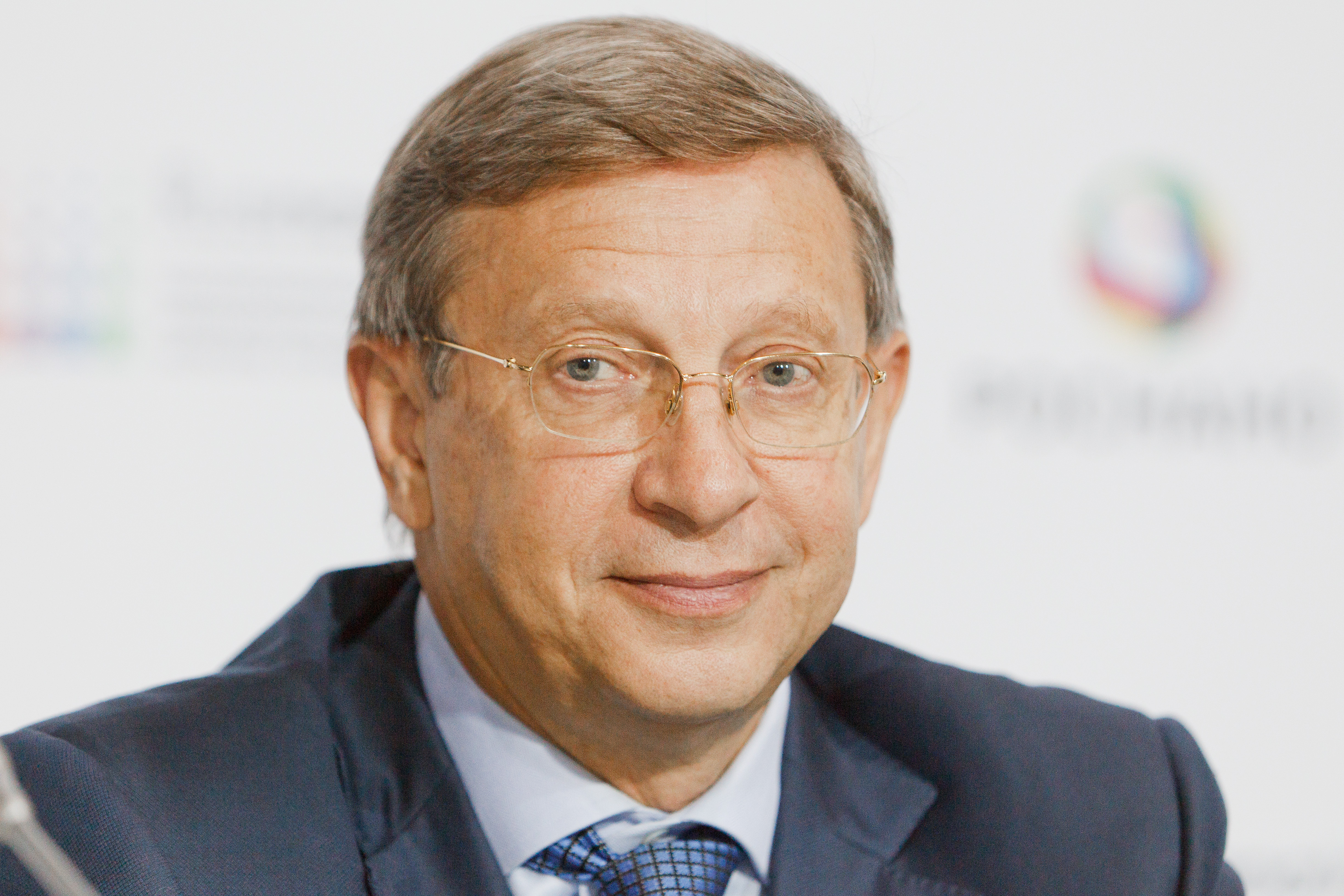
- Yevtushenkov in 2011
- Born: 25 September 1948 (age 77); Smolensk, Smolensk Oblast, Russian SFSR, Soviet Union (now Russian Federation)
- Spouse: Nataliya Nikolayevna
- Children: 2

Vladimir Petrovich Yevtushenkov (Note: Also transliterated as Evtushenkov.) (Russian: Владимир Петрович Евтушенков; born 25 September 1948) is a Russian billionaire business oligarch. He is the majority owner (49.2%) and former сhairman of Sistema. As a member of the Russian-Saudi Economic Council and as chairman since 2002 of the Russian side of both the Russian-Saudi and Russian-Arab Business Councils which are part of the Chamber of Commerce and Industry (CCI), he maintains very close ties to both Saudi Arabia and the Arab world. (Note: In addition to his Sistema, Renova is also a member of the Russian side of both the Russian-Saudi and Russian-Arab Business Councils.)

== Early life ==
Yevtushenkov has master's degrees in chemistry (1973, from D. Mendeleev Moscow Chemical Engineering Institute) and economics (1980), and a PhD in economics (1986). Yevtushenkov worked as an engineer at Karacharovo Plastics Works until 1982, and as chief engineer and first deputy general director of the Polymerbyt Scientific and Production Association until 1987, when he was appointed as the head of the Department of Science and Technology for the Moscow city government.

One year after Yuri Luzhkov became mayor of Moscow, Yevtushenkov resigned from the Moscow city government in 1993 to establish Sistema from his small city department known as the Moscow Committee on Science and Technology.

He is allegedly close to Serhiy Taruta, Viktor Yanukovych and Mykola Bilokon.

== Career ==
The first firm he gained control was Moscow City Telephone Network (MGTS) purchasing a 55% stake in MGTS during privatization. In 1993, he gained control of the Moscow Bank for Reconstruction and Development (Note: Established in 1993, the Moscow Bank for Reconstruction and Development (Russian: Московский Банк Реконструкции и Развития) became MTS Bank (Russian: МТС Банк) in February 2012.) that became a designated bank for the Government of Moscow which greatly increased cash flows through the bank and, in February 2018, MTS Bank became the sole operator for five years on the Mayor of Moscow's website mos.ru. Нe is the major shareholder and since 1995 was chairman of the board of the Russian investment holding company Sistema (together with another Top Managers such as Evgeny Novitsky). In April 2022, Yevtushenkov reduced his stake in Sistema below control (49.2%) and stepped down from the corporation's board of directors. Sistema was an early shareholder in Russian mobile telecommunications pioneer VimpelCom, and sold its stake when the company was the first Russian company to list on the New York Stock Exchange in November 1996. Yevtushenkov took Sistema public in February 2005, in a $1.35 billion IPO that was Russia's largest ever at the time. Sistema decided as early as October 2022 to sell its stake in EWUB. etc.

In 2009, Sistema purchased oil and gas companies in the Republic of Bashkortostan. This would be the foundation of the oil and gas company Bashneft.

Currently, Yevtushenkov owns 49.2% of the total conglomerate. In 2014, according to Forbes, he was Russia's 15th richest businessman with a fortune of around US$9 billion. On the Forbes 2016 list of the world's billionaires, he was ranked #722 with a net worth of US$2.4 billion. By February 2018 his assets had fallen to US$2 billion, and his rank plunged to #1215; by November 2018, Yevtushenkov was Russia's 62nd wealthiest man with his total means amounting US$1.4 billion and dropping to #1541 in the world's billionaires ranking.

== Sanctions ==
In 2014, Vladimir Yevtushenkov was charged in the "Bashneft case". In 2016, the Investigative Committee terminated the prosecution as they did not find any elements of a crime in Yevtushenkov's actions.7 April 2022 Yevtushenkov was included in the sanctions list of Australia.

The United Kingdom imposed sanctions in April 2022, freezing his assets in the UK as Yevtushenkov handed his son 10% of Sistema, reducing his personal holding to 49.2%.

On September 1, 2022, the High Anti-Corruption Court of Ukraine ruled to confiscate Yevtushenko's assets. These are 17 real estate objects with an area of more than 100 thousand square meters, as well as shares in Ukrainian enterprises. Meanwhile, Vladimir Yevtushenkov stated that he is unaware of any assets belonging to him that could have been confiscated in Ukraine since he does not have any there.

== Personal life ==
He and his wife Natalya Nikolayevna (Russian: Наталья Николаевна), live in the Odintsovo city district of Moscow at Zhukovka (Russian: Жуковка). He is Jewish.

Vladimir Yevtushenkov has two children:

- Son Felix (born 1978) is a Russian entrepreneur and investor. Senior Managing Partner of AFK Sistema, since 2019 till April 2023 — Chairman of the Board of Directors of MTS.
- Daughter Tatiana Yevtushenkova (born 1976). At the age of 26, Tatiana was "invited to MTS OJSC for the position of Vice President for Investments and Securities", later she was a member of the MTS Board of Directors. In 2008 — Advisor to the President of Sberbank of Russia. In 2015, she managed the investment fund Redline Capital.
