= Roman Personov =

- Born: January 4, 1932; Moscow, Soviet Union
- Died: January 17, 2002 (aged 70); Moscow, Russia
- Education: Moscow State Pedagogical University
- Known for: Laser selective spectroscopy of doped solids
- Awards: Humboldt Prize (1998)
- Scientific career
- Fields: Physics
- Workplaces: Institute for Spectroscopy Russian Academy of Sciences
- Doctoral advisor: Eduard Shpolsky

Roman Ivanovich Personov (January 4, 1932 – January 17, 2002) was a Soviet and Russian scientist, professor, doctor, one of the founders of selective laser spectroscopy of complex molecules in solids (frozen solutions).

== Professional Accomplishments ==
Personov is credited with discovering site-selective spectroscopy in 1972

He was awarded the Humboldt Prize in 1998.
