= Yaroslavl Radio Plant =

Coordinates: 57.554°N 39.952°E

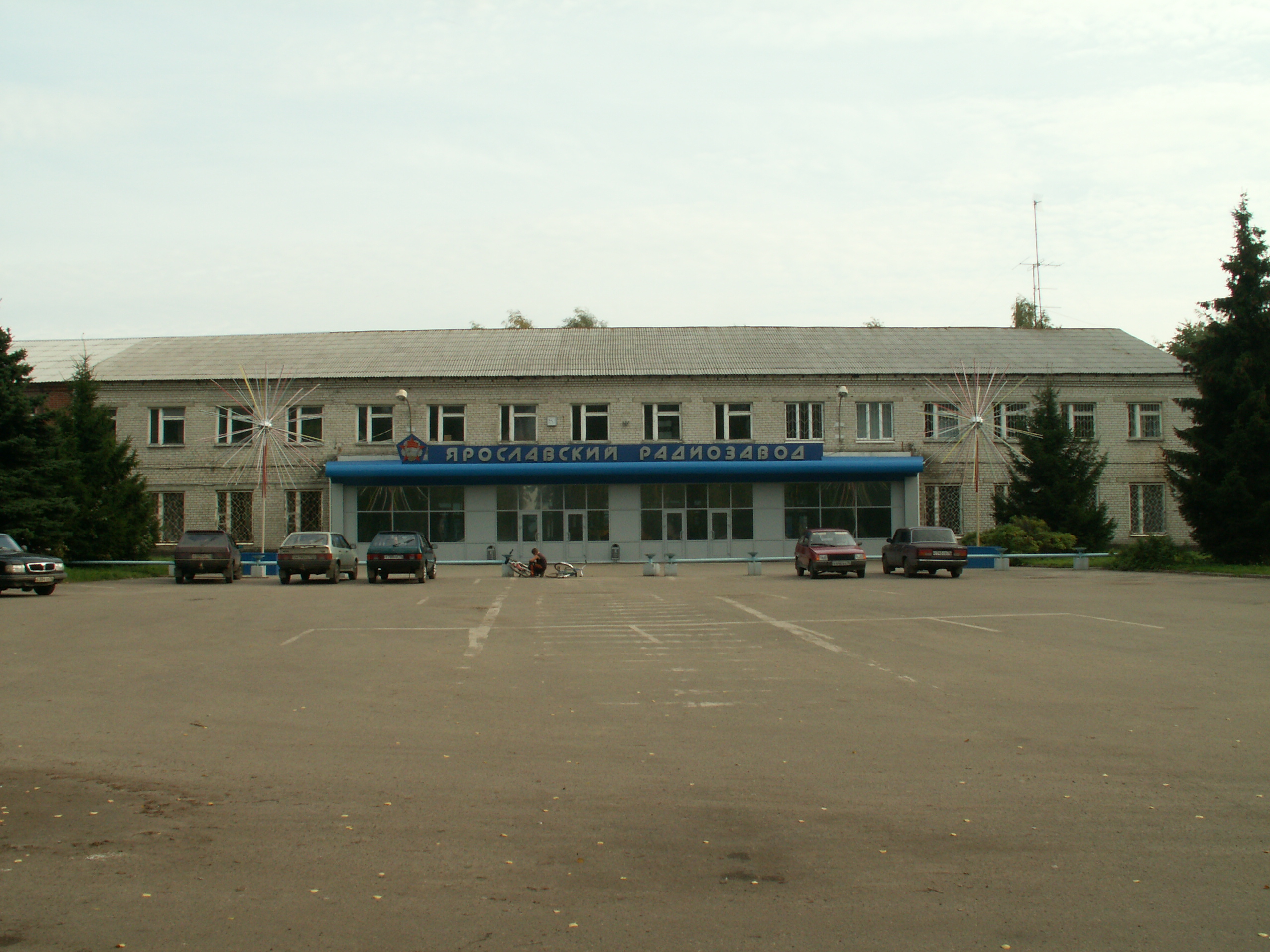
Yaroslavl Radio Plant

PJSC Yaroslavl Radioworks (Russian: Ярославский радиозавод) is a company based in Yaroslavl, Russia.

The Yaroslavl Radio Plant produces communications equipment for military and civil use, including radio sets for air-to-air, air-to-ground and ground-to-air radio telephone communication and for transmission and reception of coded telemetry information.
