= Physics-Uspekhi =

- Discipline: Physics
- Language: English
- Edited by: Valery Rubakov

Publication details
- Former name(s): Uspekhi Fizicheskikh Nauk, Soviet Physics Uspekhi
- History: 1918-present (in Russian); 1958-present (in English)
- Publisher: IOP Publishing (Russia/United Kingdom)
- Frequency: Monthly
- Impact factor: 3.361 (2020)

Standard abbreviations
- ISO 4: Phys.-Uspekhi

Indexing
- CODEN: PHUSEY
- ISSN: 1063-7869 (print); 1468-4780 (web)
- LCCN: 93646146
- OCLC no.: 36334507

Links
- Journal homepage

Physics-Uspekhi is a peer-reviewed scientific journal. It is an English translation of the Russian journal of physics, Uspekhi Fizicheskikh Nauk (Russian: Успехи физических наук, Advances in Physical Sciences) which was established in 1918. The journal publishes long review papers which are intended to generalize and summarize previously published results, making them easier to use and to understand. The journal covers all topics of modern physics. The English version has existed since 1958, first under the name Soviet Physics Uspekhi and after 1993 as Physics-Uspekhi. The year 2008 marked the 90th birthday with a jubilee retrospective.

The founder of the journal, Eduard Shpolsky, was editor-in-chief from 1918 to his death in 1975. Vitaly Ginzburg, connected with the journal since before World War II, was appointed editor-in-chief in 1998. In his 2006 Nobel autobiography, Ginzburg called it "a good and useful journal" and credited its "maintenance of the highest level" to long-term editorial manager M. S. Aksentyeva.

== Abstracting and indexing ==
The journal is abstracted and indexed in:

- Science Citation Index
- Current Contents
- Inspec
- Physics Abstracts
- Chemical Abstracts
- Scopus
- Chemical Abstracts Service
- Compendex
- INIS Atomindex
- NASA Astrophysics Data System

According to the Journal Citation Reports, the journal has a 2020 impact factor of 3.361.
