= Sistema =

Russian conglomerate company

OJSC JSFC Sistema
- Native name: АО АФК Система
- Type: Public company (OAO)
- Traded as: MCX: AFKS; LSE: SSA
- Industry: Conglomerate
- Founded: 1993; 33 years ago
- Headquarters: Moscow, Russia
- Key people: Vladimir Yevtushenkov
- Products: Telecommunications; Banking; Real estate; Retail; Media; Tourism; Space technology; Medical services; Biotechnology
- Revenue: $12.3 billion (2023)
- Operating income: $1.37 billion (2023)
- Net income: −$62.4 million (2023)
- Total assets: $27.7 billion (2023)
- Total equity: $1.74 billion (2023)
- Number of employees: 70,000
- Subsidiaries: Mobile TeleSystems; Moscow City Telephone Network; SkyLink; MTS India; Sitronics
- Website: www.sistema.com

AFK Sistema PAO is a large Russian conglomerate company founded by Vladimir Yevtushenkov, who was chairman of the corporation's board of directors until 2022. In April 2022, Yevtushenkov's shareholding in Sistema decreased to 49.2%, and he stepped down from Sistema's board of directors.

Sistema has its headquarters in Moscow. The company's global depository receipts (GDRs) traded on the London Stock Exchange from 2005 until delisting in May 2023. It has been under US sanctions since November 2023.

== History ==
In 1993, Evgeny Novitsky and Vladimir Yevtushenkov founded the holding company AFK Sistema, also known as Sistema JSFC, to group together several information technology (IT) and cell phone companies including MTS. (Note: Novitsky is alleged to be one of the treasurers of the Solntsevskaya Bratva and is very close to Semion Mogilevich.)

== Structure ==
Sistema operates several consumer service businesses in the areas of:

- IT and telecoms — Mobile TeleSystems, Moscow City Telephone Network, SkyLink, Sitronics (formerly known as 'Science Center Concern'), NIIME, Mikron, STROM telecom.
- Banking — MTS Bank, East-West United Bank
- E-commerce – Ozon
- House-Building and Real Estate — Sistema-Gals till the end of 2010. In February 2019, Sistema became the largest shareholder of Etalon Group
- Retail — Detsky Mir Group until September 2020
- Media — Sistema Mass Media until 2016
- Healthcare and Pharmaceuticals — Medsi, Binnopharm
- Agroholding - Steppe (Russian: «Агрохолдинг Степь»), which, according to Forbes in June 2019, is the second largest land bank in Russia. It has holdings in Rostov Oblast and Stavropol Krai.
- Segezha Group, a vertically integrated holding company in the timber industry, performs a full cycle of operations from logging to advanced wood processing
- Hospitality – Cosmos Hotel Group
- Other businesses — Intourist (Travel Services), until July 2021 RTI Systems (Radio and space technology), Olympic Sistema (Sport)
- Kronstadt Group until July 2021. On 27 July 2021, AO Kronstadt acquired 80% of the shares of NPP Strela (Research and Production Enterprise, Bykovo, Moscow Region), engaged in helicopter-type UAV work.
- The corporation also invests in innovation projects, such as green hydrogen, and venture businesses.

In November 2021, "Sistema" was included in "Khabarovsky Project" (in Khabarovsk Krai) for pilot production of green hydrogen with a projected 350 thousand tons per year, according to Ministry of Industry and Trade (Russia).

== Interests and subsidiaries ==
=== Banking ===
In February 2005, AFK Sistema owned a 49% stake in East-West United Bank (Luxembourg), which was established in June 1974 as a "daughter" bank of the Central Bank of Russia and is one of the five Russian foreign banks of the VTB network. (Note: With the support of Mr. Pierre Werner, who was the Prime Minister of the Grand Duchy of Luxembourg, on 12 June 1974, the East-West United Bank (EWUB) (Luxembourg) was formed with both the State Bank of the USSR or Gosbank and after the end of the Soviet Union, the Central Bank of Russia, and Russia's Foreign Trade Bank Vneshtorgbank (VTB) as the main shareholders from founding until 1992. From 1992 to 2000, Imperial Bank had a major stake in EWUB of 49% and Tokobank held a 28% stake in EWUB in 1998, but, on 17 April 2000, Imperial Bank was dissolved. Imperial Bank focused on oil and natural gas supplies to East Germany and later to Germany including the oil-for-pipes program. With Vnesheconombank managing Soviet debt, Imperial Bank speculated in GKOs but collapsed with the demise of the GKO market following the 1998 financial collapse in Russia. From 2000 to 2007, VTB had a major stake in EWUB. Beginning in 2001, the Vladimir Yevtushenkov led Sistema gained a stake in EWUB and since 2007 Sistema has had the majority stake in EWUB.) In 2018, Sistema held a 100% stake in East-West United Bank (EWUB) with Sergei Pchelintsev (Russian: Сергей Алексеевич Пчелинцев) as the CEO. In 2021, the company's revenue amounted to 24 billion rubles.

Following the February and March 2022 sanctions issued against VTB and its subsidiaries which include the former daughter banks of the Soviet Union's State Bank Gosbank and later the Central Bank of Russia, EWUB in Luxembourg has become the principal Russian overseas bank in Europe after Gazprombank ceased operations in the region. As of the end of March 2022, the Vladimir Yevtushenkov (Russian: Владимир Петрович Евтушенков) controlled Sistema and its subsidiary East-West United Bank (EWUB) in Luxembourg have not been sanctioned due to Russian invasion of Ukraine. He no longer controls Sistema after reducing his stake in the corporation below control (49.2%), and voluntarily resigned from its board of directors in April 2022.

=== Hotels ===
Sistema's hotel business is run by Cosmos Hotel Group, which in 2021 managed 19 hotels in 15 cities in Russia and abroad, including Park Inn by Radisson and Holiday Inn Express hotels owned by Sistema. In February 2023, Cosmos Hotel Group agreed to buy the companies owning ten hotels in Russia from the Norwegian company Wenaas Hotel Russia for up to €203 million. The hotels included the Pribaltiyskaya and Pulkovskaya hotels in Saint Petersburg.

=== Aerospace and defence ===
Until July 2021 AFK Sistema PAO had an aerospace and defence subsidiary, Kronstadt Group, which was acquired in 2015 and developed uncrewed aerial vehicles, and flight simulators. AFK Sistema no longer controls any assets related to the defense industry.

== Bashneft interest seizure and Rosneft lawsuit ==
In 2014, 72% of Sistema's interest in Bashneft was seized by the Russian government.

On 3 May, 2017, Sistema shares plunged about 37% following a $1.9 billion lawsuit filed by Rosneft.

On 15 May 2017, the Arbitration Court of Bashkortostan registered a RUB 106.6bn claim filed by Rosneft and Bashneft against Sistema, a preliminary hearing of the case was scheduled for 6 June, Irina Nurislamova was appointed as a judge for the case.

In December 2017, AFK Sistema reached an amicable agreement with Rosneft and agreed to pay out 100 billion roubles ($1.7 billion) to resolve the dispute.

== Management ==
On 27 June 2020, Etienne Schneider became an independent director of Sistema, at which his close political friend Jeannot Krecké had been a director at Sistema since May 2012. Positions they resigned in February 2022.
