= Mikhail Vasilyevich Shuleikin =

Soviet radio engineer (1884–1939)

Mikhail Vasilyevich Shuleikin Михаил Васильевич Шулейкин
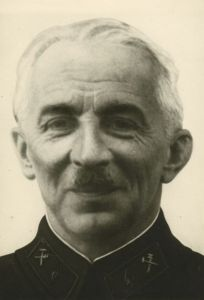
- Born: 21 October 1884; Moscow
- Died: 17 July 1939 (aged 54); Moscow
- Resting place: Novodevichy Cemetery
- Education: Peter the Great St. Petersburg Polytechnic University
- Scientific career
- Fields: Radio-frequency engineering

Mikhail Vasilyevich Shuleikin (Russian: Михаил Васильевич Шулейкин; 21 October 1884 - 7 July 1939) was a Soviet scientist in the field of Radio-frequency engineering, professor, academician of the USSR Academy of Sciences.

== Biography ==
He was born in 1884 in Moscow, the son of a merchant - the owner of a wallpaper factory and two stores.

In 1908 he graduated from the St. Petersburg Polytechnic Institute, received a diploma of an electrical engineer and was left at the institute as a junior laboratory assistant of an electromachine laboratory for specialization in radio engineering. From 1908 to 1909 he served in the Army.

From 1914 to 1918 he taught at the Petrograd Polytechnic Institute, taught courses: "collector motors", "radiotelegraph generators" and directed the diploma design of radio telegraph stations and high frequency machines.

In 1913-1918 he worked at the Radiotelegraph Plant of the Maritime Department, where he organized the first factory in Russia for manufacturing radio engineering measuring instruments.

From 1919, he headed the departments of radio engineering in a number of Sovet institutes, including: Institute of National Economy. G.V. Plekhanov, Military Electrotechnical Communication Academy, Moscow Electrotechnical Institute of Communications, V.N. Podbelsky and Moscow Power Engineering Institute.

On 1 February 1933, he was elected a corresponding member of the USSR Academy of Sciences in the Department of Mathematics and Natural Sciences, 28 January 1939 - full member (academician) of the USSR Academy of Sciences in the Division of Technical Sciences (specialty - radio engineering).

== Literature ==
- Proceedings on the propagation of radio waves in the upper layers of the atmosphere.
- Proceedings on the theory of long-wave antennas.
- Der Empfang Elektrischer Wellen in der Drahtlosen ... Waves in the Wireless Telegraphy" Annalen der Physik IV, 25, 1908
