= Sitronics =

- Type: Joint-stock company
- Founded: 1997
- Headquarters: Moscow, Russia
- Revenue: 31,480,000,000 Russian ruble (2012)
- Parent: Sistema
- Website: sitronics.ru

Sitronics (Russian: Ситро́никс) is a Russian microelectronics company owned by Sistema Holdings. Based in Moscow, its main products are electronics fabs. It has R&D facilities NIIME and Mikron in Zelenograd, and other facilities elsewhere in Eastern Europe.

== History ==
Sitronics was founded in 1997 in Zelenograd, initially called Scientific Center. By 2000, the company was a fully vertically-integrated company, organized into three business streams: Telecom Solutions, Information Technologies, and Microelectronic Solutions. The first focused on the production of software and hardware for fixed and mobile communications operators and corporations in the communications services sector, while the second handled consulting, enterprise management systems, system integration, distribution, training, and after-sales services, among others. The third stream specialized in the designing, manufacturing, and sale of microelectronic products such as computer chips and smart cards. Mikron – a division of this third unit – was focused on the development of RFID labels, reportedly producing 50 million tags monthly in 2013, making it Russia's largest producer of the technology.

In January 2005, its headquarters was moved to Moscow. By November 2005, the company renamed to Sitrionics. It began an aggressive internationalization strategy based on partnerships with regional and national tech companies including Cisco Systems, STMicroelectronics, Infineon, Giesecke+Devrient, Siemens, Motorola, Oracle, Intel, Sun Microsystems, and Microsoft. On February 7, 2007, the company placed an IPO on the London Stock Exchange. Through a series of acquisitions, it became a leading Russian microelectronics company, earning more than $1 billion in the first three quarters of 2007. Despite losses in 2007, the company remained part of Sistema as it was expanding its product portfolio, bidding for large telecommunications contracts including a $1 billion deal to build a network in Saudi Arabia. The company was delisted from the London Stock Exchange in 2012.

In August 2021, Sitronics acquired a 71.06% stake in the space-tech company Sputnix.

== Operation ==
Sitronics Group is engaged in the digitalization of strategic sectors of the economy, including shipping and marine navigation, the implementation of integrated solutions for smart cities and security, as well as the development of IoT systems and software.

One of the priority activities of Sitronics Group is the production of its own IT equipment. The company has launched mass production of domestically produced servers under its own brand. The company is also creating charging infrastructure for electric vehicles throughout Russia. The company has a modern software platform for monitoring and managing equipment, including charging stations, which have successfully established themselves in the charging services market.

== Telecommunications ==
Sitronics launched the first smartphone that featured GLONASS technology in 2010. One of its most important ventures overseas was a joint-venture with ZTE Corporation, holding 51 percent to the latter's 49 percent, enabling the former to migrate its mass manufacturing and production capacity from Europe to Southeast Asia.

== See also ==
- Intracom Holdings
