= MTS Bank =

Russian commercial bank

- Native name: МТС Банк
- Type: Public Joint Stock Company
- Industry: Financial services
- Predecessor: Moscow Bank for Reconstruction and Development
- Founded: 1993; 33 years ago
- Headquarters: Moscow, Russia
- Area served: Russia
- Key people: Filatov Ilya Valentinovich (Chairman)
- Products: Retail banking, online banking, mobile banking
- Net income: 14,437,000,000 Russian ruble (2025)
- Total assets: 754,498,000,000 Russian ruble (2025)
- Owner: MTS (telecommunications) majority shareholder
- Number of employees: 4,702 (2015)
- Website: www.mtsbank.ru

MTS Bank (Russian: МТС Банк) is a Russian commercial bank headquartered in Moscow. It provides retail banking and business banking services throughout Russia and has a focus on mobile banking. The bank was founded in 1993 and is majority owned by Russian telecoms company MTS.

On February 24, 2023, due to the Russian invasion of Ukraine, the bank was added to the sanctions list of the United States, United Kingdom and Australia.

== History ==
The bank was founded in 1993 as PJSC Joint-Stock Commercial Bank Moscow Bank for Reconstruction and Development. In 2012 the bank was renamed as MTS Bank. In 2016, the bank opened access to Samsung Pay and Apple pay for its clients. In 2017 it was selected as the main operator of payment services for the official website of the Mayor of Moscow and the mobile application “Gosuslugi Moskvy”

In 2021, MTS Bank placed its debut bond issue for 5 billion rubles.

On 24 February 2023, amid Russia's invasion of Ukraine, MTS Bank was placed on the US sanctions list for "engaging in benefiting from the Russian government". At the same time, the bank was placed on the UK sanctions list for similar reasons. As a result, MTS Bank's assets with a total book value of RUB 9.6 billion were frozen. On 19 May 2023, the bank was placed under Australian sanctions.

On March 31, 2023, due to sanctions imposed by the United States, “taking into account the sanctions risks,” the Central Bank of the UAE revoked the previously issued license of MTS Bank. The bank was also forced to refuse settlements in US dollars, Turkish lira, Uzbek soums, Omani rials and Azerbaijani manats.

In early September 2023, information about a data leak of almost 1 million MTS Bank clients appeared on the Internet. On October 19, 2023, the Russian government authority, Roskamnadzor confirmed the leak and initiated a violation of personal data protocol.
