= List of institutions of higher education in Siberia =

- Altai State Agrarian University (Barnaul, 1943)
- Altai State Institute of Culture (Barnaul, 1974)
- Altai State Humanities Pedagogical University (Biysk, 1939)
- Altai State Medical University (Barnaul, 1954)
- Altai State Pedagogical University (Barnaul, 1933)
- Altai State Technical University (Barnaul, 1942)
- Altai State University (Barnaul, 1973)
- Amur State Medical Academy (Blagoveshchensk, 1952)
- Amur State University (Blagoveshchensk, 1975)
- Amur State University for the Humanities and Education (Komsomolsk-on-Amur, 1954)
- Arctic State Agrotechnological University (Yakutsk, 1985)
- Arctic State Institute of Culture and Arts (Yakutsk, 2000)
- Baikal State University (Irkutsk, 1930)
- Blagoveshchensk State Pedagogical University (1930)
- Bratsk State University
- Buryat State Agricultural Academy (Ulan-Ude, 1931)
- Buryat State University (Ulan-Ude, 1932)
- Chita State Academy of Medicine (1953)
- East Siberia State University of Technology and Management (Ulan-Ude, 1955)
- East Siberian Institute of the Ministry of Internal Affairs of Russia (Irkutsk, 1962)
- East Siberian State Institute of Culture (Ulan-Ude, 1960)
- Far Eastern Federal University (Vladivostok, 1899)
- Far Eastern Higher Combined Arms Command School (Blagoveshchensk, 1940)
- Far Eastern State Academy of Physical Culture (Khabarovsk, 1967)
- Far Eastern State Agrarian University (Blagoveshchensk, 1949)
- Far Eastern State Institute of Arts (Vladivostok, 1962)
- Far Eastern State Medical University (Khabarovsk, 1929)
- Far Eastern State Technical Fisheries University (Vladivostok, 1930)
- Far Eastern State Technical University (1930)
- Far Eastern State University (1899)
- Far Eastern State University of Railway Engineering (Khabarovsk, 1937)
- Gorno-Altaisk State University (1949)
- Higher School of Music of the Republic of Sakha (Yakutsk, 1992)
- Irkutsk Institute of Railway Engineering (1975)
- Irkutsk National Research Technical University (1930)
- Irkutsk State Academy of Economics
- Irkutsk State Agrarian University (1934)
- Irkutsk State Medical University (1919)
- Irkutsk State University (1918)
- Irkutsk State Linguistic University (1948)
- Kamchatka State Technical University (1942)
- Kamchatka State University (1958)
- Kemerovo Agricultural Institute
- Kemerovo State Institute of Culture (1969)
- Kemerovo State Medical University (1955)
- Kemerovo State University (1973)
- Kemerovo Institute of Food Science and Technology
- Khabarovsk State Institute of Arts and Culture (1968)
- Khabarovsk State University of Economics and Law (1970)
- Khakass State University (Abakan, 1939)
- Komsomolsk-on-Amur State University (1955)
- Krasnoyarsk State Agrarian University (1953)
- Krasnoyarsk State University (Russian abbreviation is KGU) (1963) (Started as a division of Novosibirsk State University, became standalone university in 1969)
- Krasnoyarsk State Medical University (Russian abbreviation is KrasGMU) (1942)
- Krasnoyarsk State Pedagogical University (Russian abbreviation is KGPU) (1932)
- Kuzbass Institute of the Federal Penitentiary Service of Russia (Novokuznetsk, 1999)
- Kuzbass State Agricultural Academy (Kemerovo, 2002)
- Kuzbass State Technical University (Kemerovo, 1950)
- Kuzbass State University
- Maritime State University (Vladivostok, 1890)
- Norilsk State Industrial Institute (1961)
- Northeastern State University (Magadan, 1960)
- North-Eastern Federal University (Yakutsk, 1956)
- Novosibirsk Conservatory (1956)
- Novosibirsk Higher Military Command School (1967)
- Novosibirsk Military Institute of Internal Troops (1971)
- Novosibirsk State Agricultural University (1936)
- Novosibirsk State Medical University (1935)
- Novosibirsk State Pedagogical University (1935)
- Novosibirsk State Technical University (1950)
- Novosibirsk State University (1959)
- Novosibirsk State University of Architecture and Civil Engineering (1930)
- Novosibirsk State University of Architecture, Design and Arts (1989)
- Novosibirsk State University of Economics and Management (1929)
- Omsk State Technical University (1942)
- Omsk Academy of Law
- Omsk Medical Academy
- Omsk Road-Transport Academy
- Omsk State Transport University (1961)
- Omsk State Agrarian University (1918) (connected with Omsk State Veterinary Institute and Institute of Agribusiness and Continuing Education)
- Omsk State Pedagogical University
- Omsk State University (1974)
- Omsk University of Consumer Service Technology
- Omsk University of Physical Culture
- Pacific National University (Khabarovsk, 1958)
- Pacific State Medical University (Vladivostok, 1958)
- Primorsky State Agricultural Academy (Vladivostok, 1957)
- Seversk State Technological Academy
- Siberian Federal University (Krasnoyarsk, 2006)
- Siberian Academy of Public Service
- Siberian State Aerospace University (Russian abbreviation is SibGAU) (Krasnoyarsk, 1960)
- Siberian State Academy of Motorcars and Roads
- Siberian State Industrial University (Novokuznetsk, 1930)
- Siberian State Institute of Arts (Krasnoyarsk, 1977)
- Siberian State Medical University (1888)
- Siberian State Technological University (Russian abbreviation is SibGTU), the oldest in the city of Krasnoyarsk, founded in 1930 as the Siberian Institute of Forest)
- Siberian State Transport University (Novosibirsk, 1932)
- Siberian State University of Communication
- Siberian State University of Geosystems and Technologies (Novosibirsk, 1933)
- Siberian State University of Telecommunications and Informatics (Novosibirsk, 1953)
- Siberian State University of Water Transport (Novosibirsk, 1951)
- Siberian University of Small Business
- South Ural State University (1943)
- Sukachev Institute of Forest (1944)
- Tomsk State University (1878) (First university in Siberia)
- Tomsk Polytechnic University (1896) (First technical university in Siberia)
- Tomsk State Pedagogical University (1902)
- Tomsk State University of Architecture and Building (1952)
- Tomsk State University of Control Systems and Radioelectronics (1962)
- Trans-Baikal State University (1938)
- Tuvan Institute of Humanitarian Research
- Tuvan State University (1952)
- Tyumen State Oil and Gas University
- Vladivostok State University of Economics and Service (1967)

== See also ==
- List of institutions of higher education in Russia
