= Komsomolsk-na-Amure constituency =

Russian legislative constituency

Komsomolsk-na-Amure single-member constituency
- Constituency of the Russian State Duma

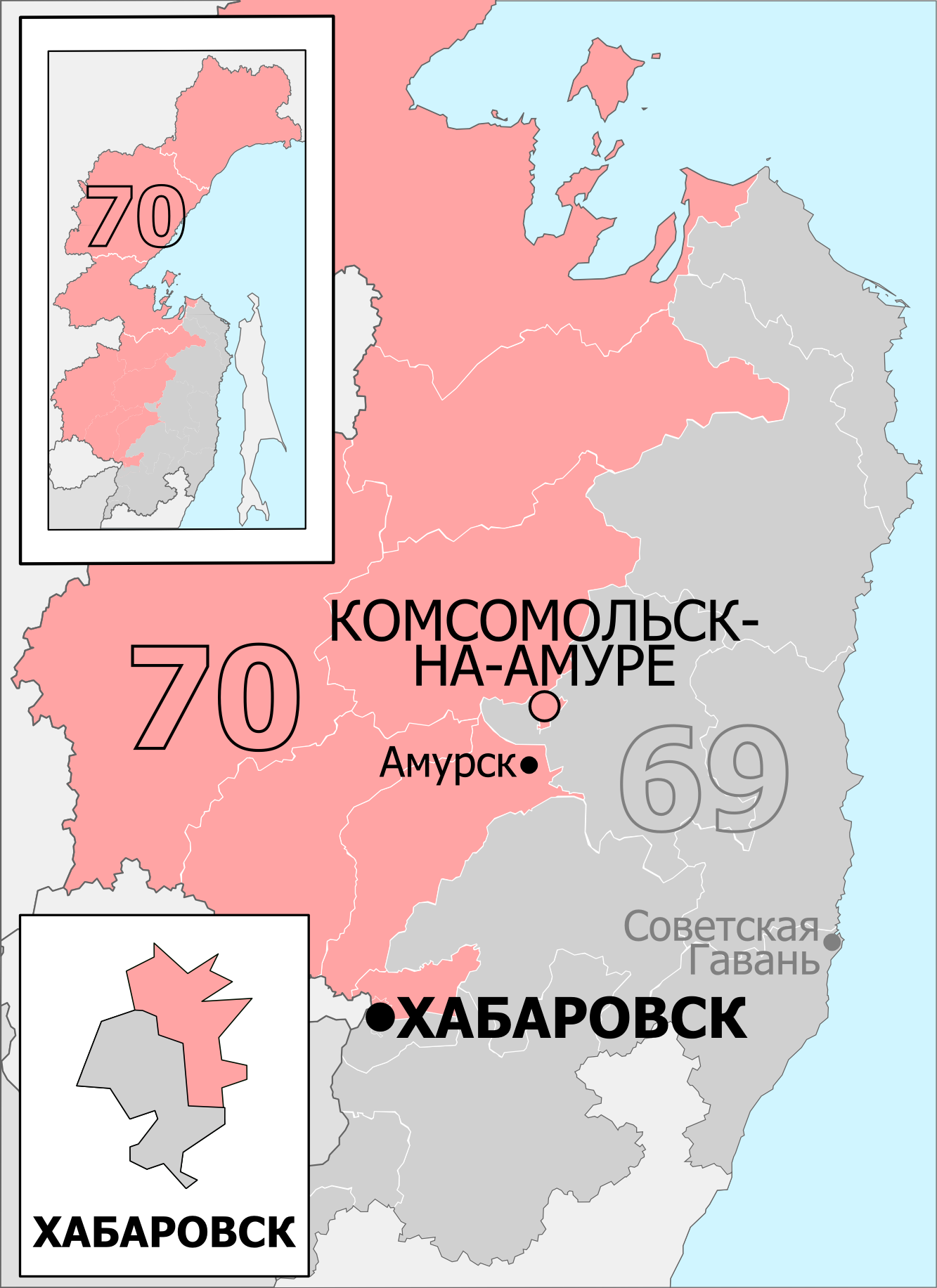
- Constituency boundaries since 2016
- Deputy: Maxim Ivanov; United Russia
- Federal subject: Khabarovsk Krai
- Districts: Amursky, Ayano-Maysky, Imeni Poliny Osipenko, parts of Khabarovsk (Zheleznodorozhny and Krasnoflotsky districts), parts of Khabarovsky (Anastasyevskoe, Chelny, Galkinskoe, Kukanskoe, Malyshevskoe, Michurinskoe, Mirnenskoe, Naumovskoe, Novokurovka, Petropavlovka, Pobedinskoe, Rakitnenskoe, Sergeyevskoe, Sikachi-Alyan, Topolevskoe, Ulika-Natsionalnoe, Vostochnoe, Yelabuzhskoe), Komsomolsk-on-Amur, Okhotsky, Solnechny, Tuguro-Chumikansky, Verkhnebureinsky
- Voters: 467,857 (2026)

The Komsomolsk-na-Amure constituency (No.74 (Note: No.56 in 1995-2003, No.57 in 1993-1995, No.58 in 2003-2007, No.70 in 2016–2026)) is a Russian legislative constituency in Khabarovsk Krai.

The constituency has been represented since 2026 by United Russia deputy Maxim Ivanov, two-term State Duma member and party official, who won the open seat, succeeding one-term United Russia incumbent Pavel Simigin.

== Boundaries ==
1993–2007: Amursk, Amursky District, Ayano-Maysky District, Imeni Poliny Osipenko District, Komsomolsk-on-Amur, Komsomolsky District, Nanaysky District, Nikolayevsk-on-Amur, Nikolayevsky District, Okhotsky District, Solnechny District, Sovetskaya Gavan, Sovetsko-Gavansky District, Tuguro-Chumikansky District, Ulchsky District, Vaninsky District, Verkhnebureinsky District
The constituency covered sparsely populated 7/8 of Khabarovsk Krai to the north of Khabarovsk, including the cities of Amursk, Komsomolsk-on-Amur, Nikolayevsk-on-Amur and Sovetskaya Gavan.

2016–present: Amursky District, Ayano-Maysky District, Imeni Poliny Osipenko District, Khabarovsk (Zheleznodorozhny and Krasnoflotsky districts), Khabarovsky District (Anastasyevskoye, Chelny, Galkinskoye, Kukanskoye, Malyshevskoye, Michurinskoye, Mirnenskoye, Naumovskoye, Novokurovka, Petropavlovka, Pobedinskoye, Rakitnenskoye, Sergeyevskoye, Sikachi-Alyan, Topolevskoye, Ulika-Natsionalnoye, Vostochnoye, Yelabuzhskoye), Komsomolsk-on-Amur, Okhotsky District, Solnechny District, Tuguro-Chumikansky District, Verkhnebureinsky District
The constituency was re-created for the 2016 election and it retained most of its northern territory, including the city of Komsomolsk-on-Amur, losing its south-eastern portion on the shore of the Tatar Strait and Komsomolsk-on-Amur suburbs to Khabarovsk constituency. This seat gained northern half of Khabarovsk and its suburbs from the former Khabarovsk constituency.

== Members elected ==
Election	Member	Party
1993	Vladimir Baryshev	Independent
1995	Nikolay Kamyshinsky	Communist Party
1999	Vyacheslav Shport	Independent
2003	Vyacheslav Shport	Independent
2007	Proportional representation - no election by constituency	
2011	Proportional representation - no election by constituency	
2016	Sergey Furgal (Note: in 2018 elected Governor of Khabarovsk Krai)	Liberal Democratic Party
2019	Ivan Pilyayev	Liberal Democratic Party
2021	Pavel Simigin	United Russia
2026	Maxim Ivanov	United Russia

== Election results ==
=== 1993 ===
Summary of the 12 December 1993 Russian legislative election in the Komsomolsk-na-Amure constituency
Candidate	Party	Votes	%
Vladimir Baryshev	Independent	71,475	29.06%
Boris Khachaturyan	Independent	–	20.70%
Vladimir Masevich	Independent	–	–
Kondrat Yevtushenko	Independent	–	–
Total		245,929	100%

=== 1995 ===
Summary of the 17 December 1995 Russian legislative election in the Komsomolsk-na-Amure constituency
Candidate	Party	Votes	%
Nikolay Kamyshinsky	Communist Party	70,977	21.70%
Valery Ponomarev	Independent	45,058	13.78%
Vladimir Baryshev (incumbent)	Independent	43,003	13.15%
Vyacheslav Shport	Duma-96	17,217	5.26%
Sergey Loktionov	Independent	14,585	4.46%
Dmitry Bubenin	Congress of Russian Communities	13,640	4.17%
Yury Maryin	Liberal Democratic Party	13,072	4.00%
Tatyana Bolyakova	Agrarian Party	12,156	3.72%
Vladimir Barikov	Independent	10,263	3.14%
Valery Vlasenko	Independent	9,536	2.92%
Konstantin Podkorytov	Independent	7,115	2.18%
Yury Sapronov	Independent	6,456	1.97%
Nikolay Stelmakh	Power to the People!	6,393	1.95%
Grigory Sobolev	Trade Unions and Industrialists – Union of Labour	6,216	1.90%
Oleg Gerasimov	Independent	4,392	1.34%
Nikolay Pustovetov	Social Democrats	4,392	1.34%
against all		39,221	11.99%
Total		327,053	100%

=== 1999 ===
Summary of the 19 December 1999 Russian legislative election in the Komsomolsk-na-Amure constituency
Candidate	Party	Votes	%
Vyacheslav Shport	Independent	136,620	46.24%
Nikolay Kamyshinsky (incumbent)	Independent	103,313	34.97%
Ruslan Khasbulatov	Independent	17,273	5.85%
against all		32,839	11.11%
Total		295,461	100%

=== 2003 ===
Summary of the 7 December 2003 Russian legislative election in the Komsomolsk-na-Amure constituency
Candidate	Party	Votes	%
Vyacheslav Shport (incumbent)	Independent	148,473	60.45%
Anatoly Dronchenko	Communist Party	35,743	14.55%
Yury Kretov	Liberal Democratic Party	14,248	5.80%
Grigory Barabanov	Independent	7,556	3.08%
against all		35,879	14.61%
Total		245,878	100%

=== 2016 ===
Summary of the 18 September 2016 Russian legislative election in the Komsomolsk-na-Amure constituency
Candidate	Party	Votes	%
Sergey Furgal	Liberal Democratic Party	63,906	36.71%
Vadim Voyevodin	Communist Party	38,876	22.33%
Yevgeny Sysoyev	A Just Russia	27,245	15.65%
Dmitry Doskov	Communists of Russia	10,171	5.84%
Oleg Pankov	Yabloko	9,384	5.39%
Eduard Shvetsov	Rodina	7,043	4.05%
Aleksandr Simontsev	People's Freedom Party	3,509	2.02%
Total		174,083	100%

=== 2019 ===
Results by district: Ivan Pilyayev: 30–40% 40–50%; Viktoria Tsyganova: 30–40%

Summary of the 8 September 2019 by-election in the Komsomolsk-na-Amure constituency
Candidate	Party	Votes	%
Ivan Pilyayev	Liberal Democratic Party	65,596	39.12%
Nikolay Platoshkin	Communist Party	41,398	24.69%
Viktoria Tsyganova	United Russia	17,901	10.68%
Tatyana Yaroslavtseva	A Just Russia	7,887	4.70%
Nikolay Yevseyenko	Party of Pensioners	5,637	3.36%
Andrey Petrov	The Greens	5,167	3.08%
Vladimir Titorenko	Communists of Russia	4,898	2.92%
Vladimir Vorobyev	Rodina	3,420	2.04%
Andrey Shvetsov	Party of Growth	3,020	1.80%
Oleg Kotov	Patriots of Russia	2,989	1.78%
Total		167,685	100%

=== 2021 ===
Results by district: Pavel Simigin: 10–20% 20–30%; Larisa Zvinyatskaya: 10–20%; Ivan Pilyayev: 10–20%

Summary of the 17-19 September 2021 Russian legislative election in the Komsomolsk-na-Amure constituency
Candidate	Party	Votes	%
Pavel Simigin	United Russia	36,998	18.14%
Larisa Zvinyatskaya	Communists of Russia	32,913	16.14%
Ivan Pilyayev (incumbent)	Liberal Democratic Party	31,034	15.22%
Natalya Yevdokimova	Party of Pensioners	23,799	11.67%
Anton Plyusnin	A Just Russia — For Truth	22,131	10.85%
Yevgeny Ilyin	New People	20,823	10.21%
Viktor Fedoreyev	Yabloko	9,016	4.42%
Andrey Kalganov	Rodina	5,404	2.65%
Vladimir Nizhenkovsky	Party of Growth	3,801	1.86%
Total		203,961	100%

=== 2026 ===
Summary of the 18-20 September 2026 Russian legislative election in the Komsomolsk-na-Amure constituency
Candidate	Party	Votes	%
Maxim Ivanov	United Russia	84,393	44.04%
Ruslan Batyu	Liberal Democratic Party	24,428	12.75%
Aleksandr Tsupko	Communist Party	20,388	10.64%
Anton Yermakov	Yabloko	14,329	7.48%
Sergey Matveyev	A Just Russia	11,546	6.03%
Yelena Rudakova	Party of Pensioners	10,166	5.31%
Marina Lepeshenko	Communists of Russia	9,142	4.77%
Olga Amosova	Party of Direct Democracy	5,133	2.68%
Yekaterina Portnyagina	The Greens	3,754	1.96%
Total		191,627	100%
