= Vyacheslav Shport =

Russian politician

- Вячеслав Шпорт
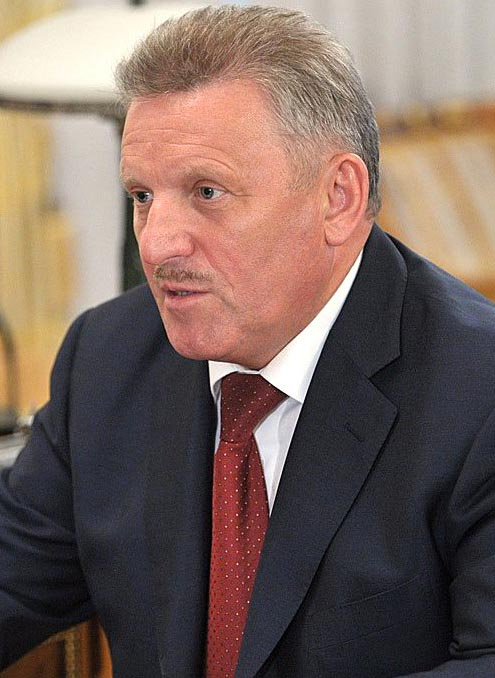
- Shport in 2013

2nd Governor of Khabarovsk Krai
- In office 8 September 2013 – 28 September 2018
- Succeeded by: Sergei Furgal

Governor of Khabarovsk Krai (acting)
- In office 30 April 2013 – 8 September 2013

2nd Governor of Khabarovsk Krai
- In office 6 May 2009 – 30 April 2013
- Preceded by: Viktor Ishayev

Governor of Khabarovsk Krai (acting)
- In office 30 April 2009 – 6 May 2009

Member of the State Duma from Khabarovsk Krai's Komsomolsk-na-Amure Constituency
- In office 18 January 2000 – 24 December 2007
- Preceded by: Nikolay Kamyshinsky
- Succeeded by: Sergei Furgal (2016)

Personal details
- Born: Vyacheslav Ivanovich Shport; 16 June 1954 (age 72) Komsomolsk-on-Amur, Khabarovsk Oblast, Russian SFSR, Soviet Union
- Party: United Russia
- Education: Komsomolsk-on-Amur Polytechnic Institute

Vyacheslav Ivanovich Shport (Russian: Вячеслав Иванович Шпорт; born 16 June 1954) is a Russian politician who served as the 2nd Governor of Khabarovsk Krai from 2009 to 2018. In September 2018, he lost the election of the governor of the Khabarovsk Krai to the LDPR candidate Sergei Furgal.

He was the member of the Communist Party of the Soviet Union until 1991, (Note: состоял на учёте в парторганизации авиационного завода) before joining the United Russia party, as he was the member of the Supreme Council of the United Russia Party from 2013 to 2017. He was the member of the State Duma from 1999 to 2007. Since 23 January 2019, he is a member of the Board of the Military-Industrial Commission of Russia, and the Member of the Marine Board under the Government of Russia.

== Biography ==
Vyacheslav Shport was born in Komsomolsk-on-Amur on 16 June 1954.

=== Education ===
Shport graduated from the Polytechnic with a degree in aircraft construction. He graduated from the Komsomolsk-on-Amur Polytechnic Institute (in absentia). In 1993, he completed an internship at Stanford University. He is a candidate of technical sciences (topic - "The use of high-strength titanium alloys in aircraft construction") in 1999. In 2003, he graduated from the law faculty of the National Institute named after Catherine the Great. Doctor of technical sciences in 2005. Shport was also the professor of the Russian nongovernmental research interregional public organization Academy of Military Sciences in 2012. His military rank is a reserve colonel.

=== Labor activity ===
Upon completion of his studies at the technical school, Shport worked as an assembler-riveter at the Komsomolsk-on-Amur Aviation Production Association named after Yuri Gagarin (KnAAPO).

From 1973 to 1975, he served in the missile forces and artillery in the Far East.

In 1979 he returned to KnAAPO, where he held positions up to the Deputy General Director - Chief Engineer of KnAAPO. From 1997 to December 1999, he became the technical director - chief engineer of KnAAPO.

On the job, he graduated with honors from the Komsomolsk-on-Amur Polytechnic Institute. Received the qualification "Mechanical Engineer of Aircraft Manufacturing".

With his participation, new samples of aviation military equipment of the Su-22, Su-27 series were mastered and launched into mass production, unique vehicles were put on alert and for export: Su-33 (ship version), Su-30MKK and Su-27SM.

On his initiative and under his direct leadership, two conversion programs were launched at KnAAPO: for the assembly of Be-103 (Amphibia) and Su-80 aircraft for 30 passengers for local and regional airlines.

=== Political career ===
In 1995, Shport ran for a member of the State Duma of the second convocation in the federal list of the electoral association "Duma-96" (No. 1 in the regional group "East"), which did not overcome the 5% barrier in the elections on 17 December 1995.

He also ran for deputies of the State Duma of the Russian Federation in the northern single-mandate constituency No. 56 (Khabarovsk Krai), but lost the elections in the constituency, taking 4th place out of 16 (4% of the votes).

On 19 December 1999, Shport was elected a member of the State Duma of the third convocation in the Komsomolsk-on-Amur single-mandate constituency No. 56 (Khabarovsk Krai), having received 46.24% of the votes in the elections. He was nominated by voters.

In the State Duma, he entered the deputy group "People's Deputy". On 11 January 2000, at the constituent assembly, he was elected one of the eight vice-chairmen of the group.

Since 26 January 2000, he was the Deputy Chairman of the State Duma Committee on Industry, Construction and Science-Intensive Technologies.

On 27 May 2000, at the founding congress of the Unity party, he was elected a member of the party's political council.

On 22 November 2000 he became a member of the Interfactional Association of the State Duma "Business Russia".

In 2002, he graduated from the Higher Academic Courses at the Military Academy of the General Staff of the Russian Armed Forces with a degree in Defense and Security of Russia.

In 2003, he received the 2nd higher education in the specialty "Jurisprudence".

On 7 December 2003, Shport was elected to the State Duma for the Komsomolsk-on-Amur single-mandate district, as he joined the United Russia party. Became Deputy Chairman of the Committee for Industry, Construction and Science-Intensive Technologies.

From 2004 to 2007, he was the Deputy Chairman of the People's Party of the Russian Federation.

In 2007, in the elections to the State Duma of the Russian Federation, he did not pass on the lists of "United Russia": Regional group No. 29 (Khabarovsk Krai, and the Jewish Autonomous Oblast), as he stood only sixth in the party list, to sixth place from fifth was moved by the will of the governor Viktor Ishayev, giving it to Aleksandr Shishkin.

From January 2008 to February 2009, he was Director of the Directorate for Production and Technical Development of the Sukhoi Aviation Holding Company.

Since 2 March 2009, he was the Deputy Chairman of the Government of the Khabarovsk Krai, as he was the Minister of Industry, Transport and Communications of the Krai.

==== Governor of Khabarovsk Krai ====
In connection with the early termination of the powers of the 1st Governor of Khabarovsk Krai Viktor Ishayev, on 30 April 2009, Shport was appointed the acting Governor of the Khabarovsk Krai. He was confirmed into office on 6 May 2009.

From 29 November 2009 to 16 June 2010 and from 24 October 2014 to 7 April 2015, he was the member of the Presidium of the State Council of the Russia.

On 30 April 2013, he was re-appointed acting Governor of the Khabarovsk Krai in connection with the upcoming elections. On 8 September 2013, the gubernatorial elections were held in the Khabarovsk Krai, in which Shport, with a score of 63.92%, defeated the main rival from the LDPR, State Duma member Sergei Furgal, who gained 19.14%.

In the elections on 9 September 2018, he lost this time to Furgal, gaining 35.62% in the first round (Furgal 35.81%). In the second round, held on 23 September 2018, scored 27.97% for Shport and 69.57% for Furgal.

==== Further activities ====
On 23 January 2019, Shport was appointed a member of the board of the Military-Industrial Commission of Russia.

== Family ==
He is married and has a son and a daughter.

His wife, Galina Andreyevna Shport, is an economist of the Komsomolsk branch of the Energosbyt branch of the Khabarovsk Krai.

His son, Roman, was born in Komsomolsk-on-Amur. He received a second degree in the United States. In 2009, he became a candidate of technical sciences, having defended his thesis on the topic "Research of the processes of crimping and distribution of pipe blanks in the manufacture of aircraft parts." He lives in Moscow. He is married, has two sons: Vyacheslav (born in 2002) and Dmitry (born in 2011).

His daughter, Svetlana, was born in 1978 in Komsomolsk-on-Amur. In 2001, she graduated from the Moscow Medical Academy named after I.M.Sechenov. In 2007, she became a candidate of medical sciences, having defended her thesis on the topic "Features of the course of an acute reaction to stress in female drivers - participants in road traffic accidents." In 2009, she became the scientific secretary of the V.P.Serbsky State Scientific Center for Social and Forensic Psychiatry. She lives in Moscow.
