= Konstantin Sintsov =

Russian entrepreneur known for his leadership in transportation and logistics

Sintsov Konstantin Vladimirovich
- Синцов Константин Владимирович
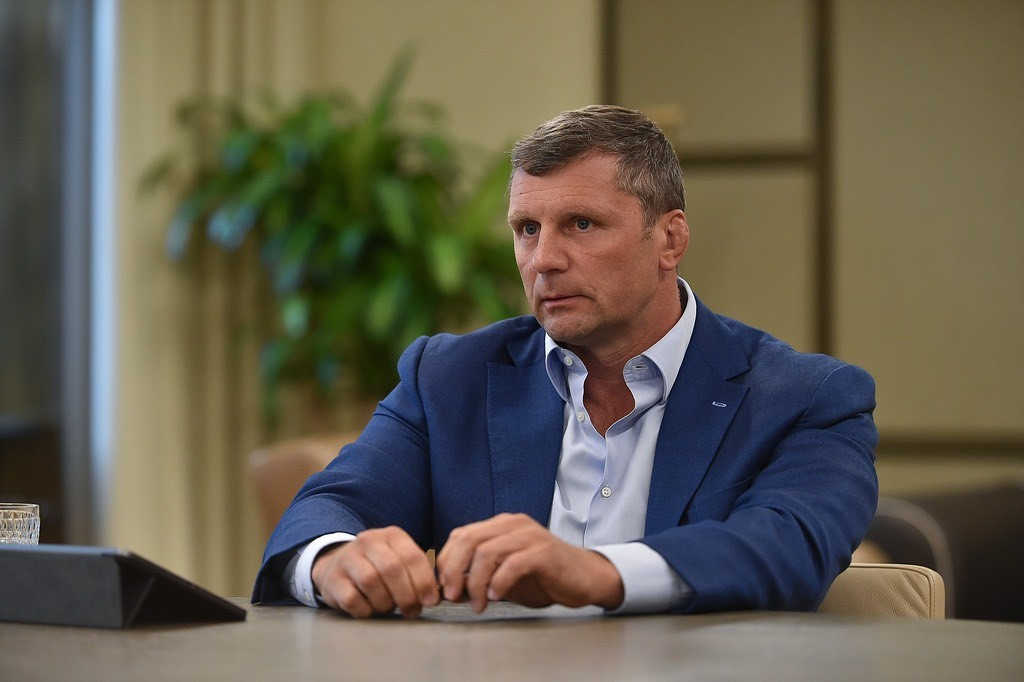
- Born: April 27, 1971 (age 53); Kemerovo, Russia
- Education: Kuzbass Polytechnic Institute, MBA from the Plekhanov University of Economics
- Board member of: Rustranskom Group of Companies (includes: Rusagrotrans, Azrustrans, LP Trans, RTC Leasing, Freight Company, TransLes), Roslavl VRZ

Sintsov Konstantin Vladimirovich (born April 27, 1971, Kemerovo) is a Russian business executive and entrepreneur who was the co-founder and former head of the Rustranscom Group of Companies.

== Early life and education ==
He was born in Kemerovo on April 27, 1971. He studied at School #49. He did freestyle wrestling. In 1988 he received the title of Master of Sports of the USSR.

In 1993, he defended his thesis at the Kuzbass Polytechnic Institute, receiving his mechanical engineering degree within the Automobiles-Automotive Industry Department.

In 2006 he received an MBA from the Plekhanov University of Economics.

In 2007, he defended his dissertation and received the degree of Candidate of Economic Sciences.

== Career ==
In 1993, Sintov started working in private companies involved in the production and supply of spare railway parts for CIS and Baltic States.

In 1999 he became the CEO of TRANSCOMPLEKTSNAB. Starting in 2001, he worked in railway transportation of grain together with Konstantin Zasov.

In 2004 he became the founder, co-owner, and CEO of LP Trans. Between 2015–2017 he was the chairman of the board of directors.

In 2008 Sintsov was the co-founder of Rusagrotrans and in 2013 he became chairman of the board of directors. The company has become the largest grain carrier in Russia and the CIS.

In 2008 he also became co-founder of Rustranskom Group of Companies (includes: Rusagrotrans, Azrustrans, LP Trans, RTC Leasing, Freight Company, TransLes); since 2011 – Roslavl Railcar Repair Plant (RVRZ) and CEO between 2014–2015. Since 2015 he was chairman of the board of directors. By 2019, RTC Group was among the top 4 largest railway operators with 68,000 railcars under operational management; revenue reached 51.5 billion rubles, net profit – 11.6 billion rubles, cargo turnover — 97.7 billion ton-kilometers.

Between 2012–2014 he was member of the board of directors of Roslavl VRZ,. Sintsov initiated the modernization of the plant, in particular, a universal platform was designed and put into production, allowing cargo to be transported in containers and wood to be transported.

== Other interests ==
In 2011, Sintsov was one of the organizers of the construction of the Kuzbass Provincial Sports Center.

In 2012, he was one of the organizers of the Miner's Glory international wrestling tournament. Participating countries included Poland, Canada, Iran, Germany, Cuba, Moldova, the US, France, and others.

In 2020, he was one of the organizers of the creation of the Kuzbass Wrestling League.

Konstantin Sintsov initiated the construction of a base on the territory of the resort in Sheregesh, and also acted as an investor in the reconstruction of the Lokomotiv sports base (Kemerovo).

== Personal life ==
He is married with children.
