= Pavel Simigin =

Russian politician

- Павел Симигин
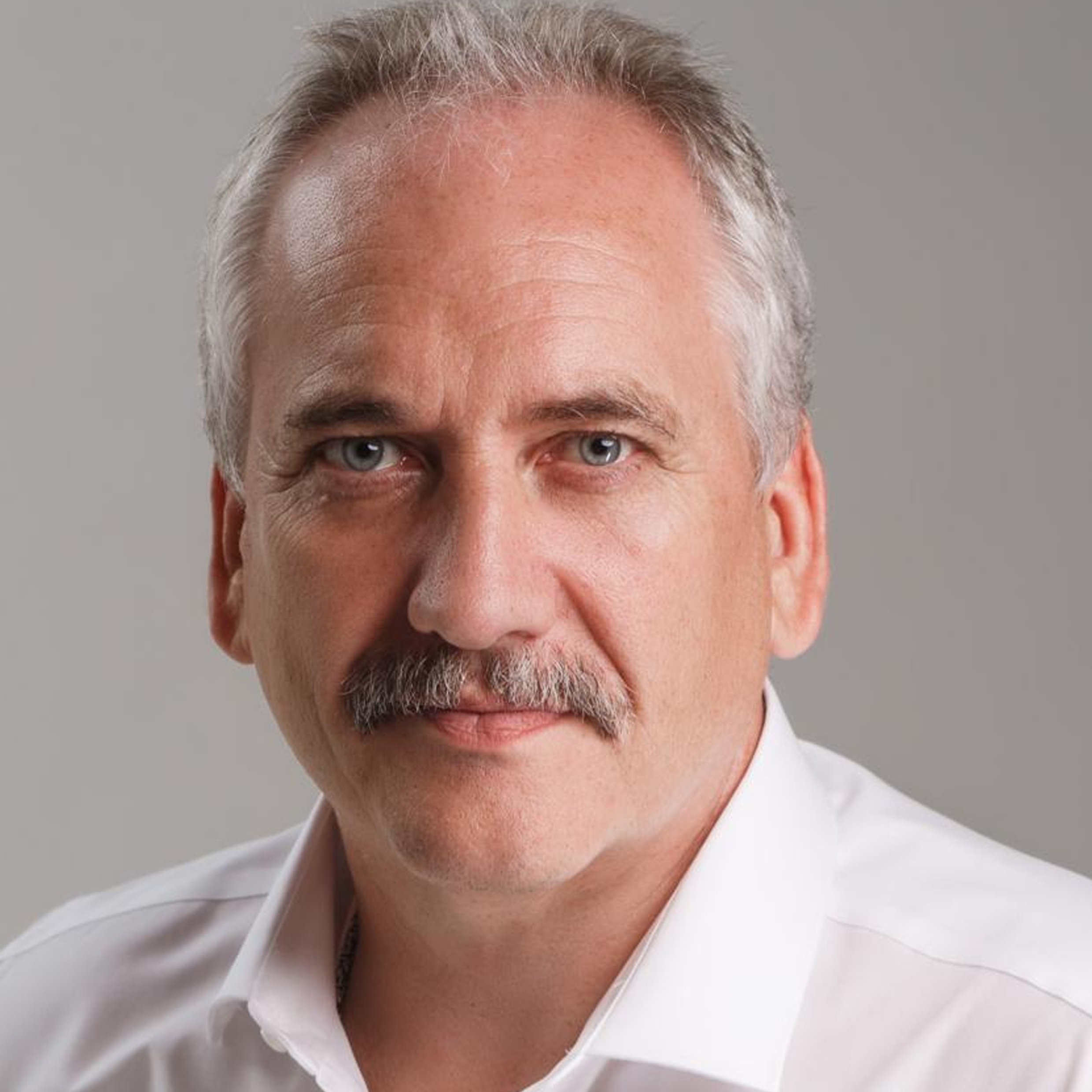

Member of the State Duma for Khabarovsk Krai
- Incumbent
- Assumed office 12 October 2021
- Preceded by: Ivan Pilyaev
- Constituency: Komsomolsk-on-Amur (No. 70)

Personal details
- Born: 26 July 1968 (age 58) Komsomolsk-on-Amur, Khabarovsk Krai, Russian SFSR, USSR
- Party: United Russia
- Children: 1
- Education: Komsomolsk-on-Amur State University

Pavel Vladimirovich Simigin (Russian: Павел Владимирович Симигин; July 26, 1968, Komsomolsk-on-Amur, Khabarovsk Krai) is a Russian political figure, deputy of the 8th State Dumas.

From 2004 to 2014, Simigin held the position of commercial director of the "Singapore" company. From 2006 to 2009, he worked as an assistant to the deputy of the Komsomolsk-on-Amur State Duma of the 5th convocation. On September 14, 2014, he was elected deputy of the Legislative Duma of Khabarovsk Krai of the 6th convocation. Since September 2021, he has served as deputy of the 8th State Duma.

== Sanctions ==
He was sanctioned by the UK government in 2022 in relation to the Russo-Ukrainian War.
