= Maxim Ivanov =

Maxim Ivanov may refer to:

- Maxim Ivanov (politician, born 1967), Russian politician
- Maxim Ivanov (politician, born 1987), Russian politician
