= 2018 Khabarovsk Krai gubernatorial election =

- 9 September 2018 (first round); 23 September 2018 (second round)
- Turnout: 36.09% (first round); 47.44% (second round)
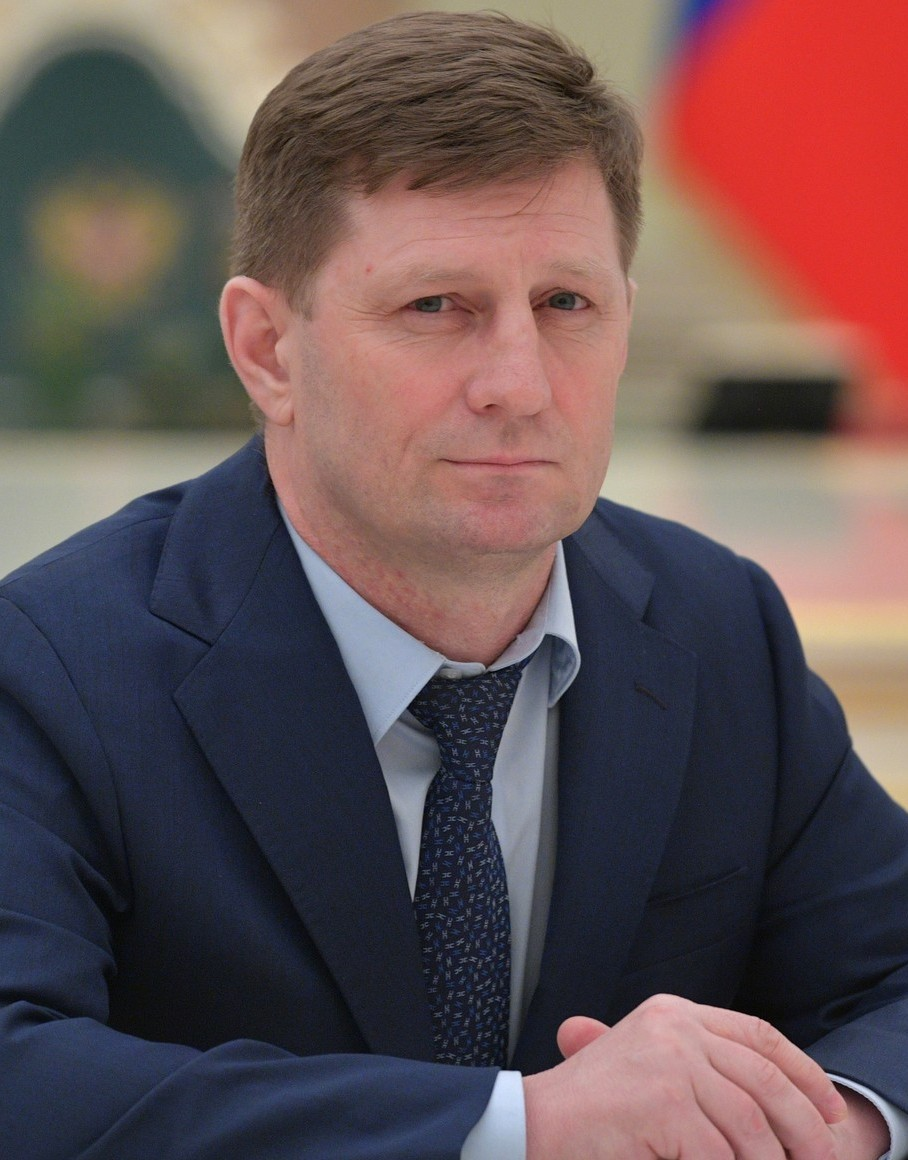

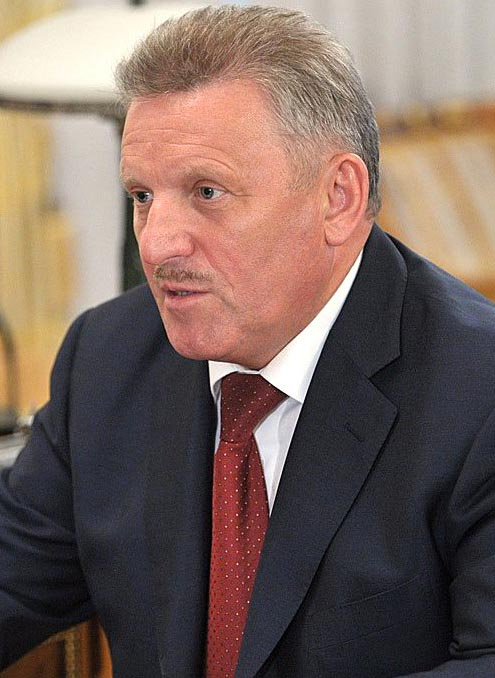
Candidate	Sergei Furgal	Vyacheslav Shport
Party	LDPR	United Russia
Popular vote	325,566	130,873
Percentage	69.57%	27.97%
- 2018 Khabarovsk Krai gubernatorial election results by municipality
Governor before election
Vyacheslav Shport
United Russia
Elected Governor
Sergei Furgal
LDPR

The 2018 Khabarovsk Krai gubernatorial election was held in September 2018. The first round was held on 9 September, on common election day, with none of the candidates gaining an absolute majority (50% + 1 vote), causing a run-off vote.

The second round was held on 23 September, between the top two candidates, the Liberal Democratic candidate Sergei Furgal and the incumbent Governor Vyacheslav Shport, nominated by the United Russia. Both of them scored 35% of the vote in the first round. In the second round, Sergei Furgal was elected Governor of Khabarovsk Krai with 69.57% of the vote.

== Background ==
Vyacheslav Shport became acting Governor of Khabarovsk Krai on 30 April 2009 after Governor Viktor Ishayev was appointed as Presidential Envoy to the Far Eastern Federal District by President Dmitry Medvedev. Shport previously served as Deputy Chairman of the Government of Khabarovsk Krai - Minister of Industry, Transportation, and Communications (since 2009) and Member of the State Duma (2000-2007). On 6 May 2009 Vyacheslav Shport was confirmed as Governor by the Legislative Duma of Khabarovsk Krai for a four-year term. In December 2010 the Legislative Duma extended Governor's term to 5 years.

Governor Shport's first term expired on 30 April 2013 but he was reappointed by President Vladimir Putin as acting Governor until the September gubernatorial election. Vyacheslav Shport won 2013 election with 63.92% of the vote, State Duma member Sergei Furgal (LDPR) came second with 19.14%.

== Candidates ==
Only political parties can nominate candidates for gubernatorial election in Khabarovsk Krai, self-nomination is not possible. However, candidate is not obliged to be a member of the nominating party. Candidate for Governor of Khabarovsk Krai should be a Russian citizen and at least 30 years old. Each candidate in order to be registered is required to collect at least 8% of signatures of members and heads of municipalities (191-200 signatures). Also gubernatorial candidates present 3 candidacies to the Federation Council and election winner later appoints one of the presented candidates.

=== Registered candidates ===
Five candidates were registered to participate in the election

Candidate	Party	Office
Igor Glukhov	A Just Russia	General Director of the "Press Distribution Agency "Express", Chair of the A Just Russia regional office
Andrey Petrov	The Greens	Manager of LLC "Alftorg"
Anastasia Salamakha	Communist Party	Individual entrepreneur
Sergei Furgal	Liberal Democratic Party	Member of the State Duma, 2013 gubernatorial candidate
Vyacheslav Shport	United Russia	Incumbent Governor

=== Candidates for the Federation Council ===
- Igor Glukhov (A Just Russia):
  - Aleksandr Danilin, pensioner
  - Maria Yermilova, chair of the "Center for Protection of Citizens' Rights" regional office
  - Mikhail Molokoyedov, general director of LLC "Siyanie"
- Andrey Petrov (The Greens):
  - Aleksey Gots, individual entrepreneur
  - Viktor Saykov, chair of The Greens regional office
  - Vyacheslav Sklyarov, chair of the regional Union of Gardeners
- Anastasia Salamakha (CPRF):
  - Aleksandr Gromov, member of the Khabarovsk Krai Legislative Duma
  - Viktor Postnikov, member of the Khabarovsk Krai Legislative Duma, 2013 gubernatorial candidate
  - Anatoly Romantsov, first secretary of CPRF Zheleznodorozhny district office
- Sergei Furgal (LDPR):
  - Yelena Greshnyakova, member of the Khabarovsk Krai Legislative Duma
  - Sergey Olnev, psychiatrist
  - Alla Shpareychuk, aide to Sergei Furgal
- Vyacheslav Shport (United Russia):
  - Natalya Lyashko, deputy director of Khabarovsk Krai Children's Library
  - Yury Plesovskikh, acting rector of Khabarovsk State University of Economics and Law
  - Aleksandr Shishkin, incumbent Member of the Federation Council

== Polls ==
Date	Poll source	Shport	Furgal	Glukhov	Salamakha	Petrov	Undecided
9 — 14 July 2018	Чёрный Куб	34 %	15 %	3%	3%	0,2 %	45%

=== Exit polls ===
Poll source	Shport	Furgal
"Media technologies"	74%	24%
"Project"	17%	81%

== Results ==
The results of the first (left) and second (right) rounds by territorial election commissions. Sergei Furgal Vyacheslav Shport

In an upset State Duma member Sergei Furgal defeated incumbent Governor Vyacheslav Shport in the first round of voting by a slim margin of 0.19 points. Shport and Head of Khakassia Viktor Zimin were the first sitting governors who lost the first round since the re-introduction of gubernatorial elections in 2012. Shport's defeat came from increasing unpopularity of ruling United Russia party as the result of the pension reform, incumbent regional government also was very unpopular due to mismanagement and deteriorating financial situation.

After the first round Vyacheslav Shport tried to consolidate his support inviting Sergei Furgal to join his administration as First Vice-Governor, Furgal accepted the offer but declined to withdraw from the race. Former mayor of Khabarovsk Aleksandr Sokolov also received an invitation to join Khabarovsk Krai Government. Governor Shport tried to quickly solve problems, for example, sacking Komsomolsk-on-Amur mayor Andrey Klimov for his ineffective work.

However, Vyacheslav Shport still lost the run-off to Sergei Furgal by more than 40 points. Shport won only 2 municipalities in the second round compared to 13 in the first round.

Candidate	Party	First round		Second round	
Candidate	Party	Votes	%	Votes	%
Sergei Furgal	Liberal Democratic Party	126,693	35.81	325,566	69.57
Vyacheslav Shport	United Russia	126,018	35.62	130,873	27.97
Anastasia Salamakha	Communist Party	55,695	15.74		
Igor Glukhov	A Just Russia	19,426	5.49		
Andrey Petrov	The Greens	13,487	3.81		
Total		341,319	100	456,439	100
Valid votes		341,319	97.43	456,439	97,54
Invalid/blank ballots		12,429	3.51	11,530	2.46
Total		353,748	100	467,969	100
Registered voters/turnout		981,032	36.09	986,341	47.44
Khabarovsk Krai Election Commission (1st round, 2nd round)

After the election newly elected Governor Sergei Furgal appointed member of Khabarovsk Krai Legislative Duma Yelena Greshnyakova as Member of the Federation Council.
