= Alexander Shishkin =

Alexander Shishkin or Aleksandr Shishkin may refer to:

- Alexander Shishkin (politician) (born 1960), Russian politician
- Aleksandr Shishkin (born 1966), Soviet and Russian footballer
