= Dmitry Demeshin =

Russian lawyer and statesman

- Дмитрий Демешин
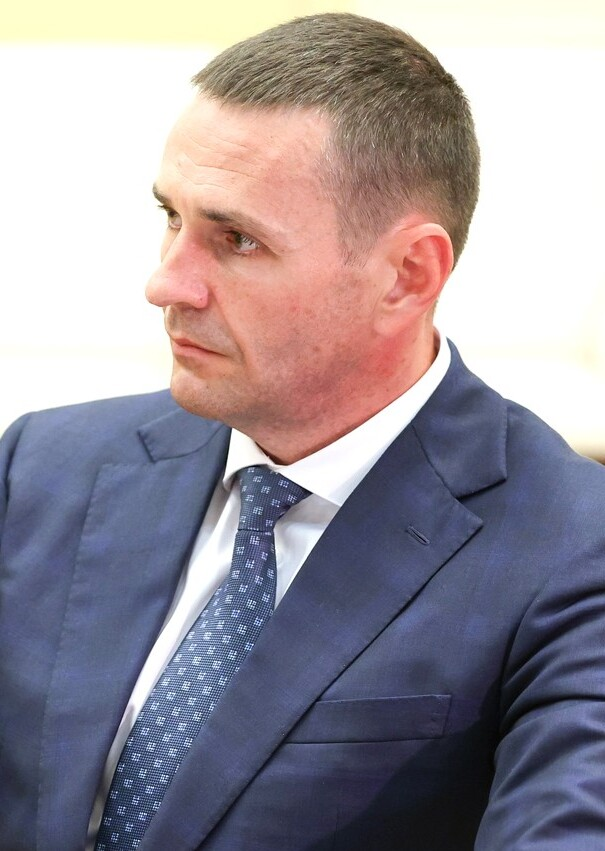
- Demeshin in August 2024

5th Governor of Khabarovsk Krai
- Incumbent
- Assumed office 13 September 2024

Governor of Khabarovsk Krai (Acting)
- In office 13 May 2024 – 13 September 2024
- Preceded by: Aleksandr Nikitin (acting)

Personal details
- Born: August 2, 1976 (age 50) Tashkent, Uzbek Soviet Socialist Republic
- Citizenship: Russia
- Education: Saratov State Academy of Law

Dmitry Viktorovich Demeshin (Russian: Дмитрий Викторович Демешин; born August 2, 1976) is a Russian lawyer and statesman serving as the Governor of Khabarovsk Krai since September 13, 2024.

== Biograрhy ==
Born on August 2, 1976, in the city of Tashkent, Uzbek SSR. In 1997, he graduated from the Saratov State Academy of Law with a degree in jurisprudence. From the same year, he served in the prosecutor's office, holding the following positions: assistant to the Kolomna city prosecutor, deputy Shchelkovo city prosecutor, Mytishchi city prosecutor of the Moscow Region prosecutor's office, first deputy prosecutor of the Rostov region and prosecutor of the Kaluga Oblast.

In 2014, he assumed the position of First Deputy Head of the Department for Supervision of the Execution of Anti-Corruption Legislation of the Prosecutor's Office of the Russian Federation. In 2015, he became Deputy Head of the Main Directorate for Supervision of the Execution of Federal Legislation of the Prosecutor General's Office of the Russian Federation, Head of the Department for Supervision of the Execution of Laws in the Field of the Defense-Industrial Complex.

In 2019–2024, he served as Deputy Prosecutor General of the Russian Federation. He is a State Counselor of Justice, 1st class.

On May 15, 2024, Vladimir Putin appointed Dmitry Demeshin as acting governor of the Khabarovsk Krai.

== Family ==
His wife is Yelena Alexandrovna Demeshina, a law graduate specializing in banking legislation. The couple has three children; their eldest son, Timur, was born in 2011.

== Awards and Titles ==
- Badge "For Military Service" (Rostov Oblast, 2012)
- Certificate of Honour of the President of the Russian Federation (2016)
