= Governor of Khabarovsk Krai =

Highest-ranking official in Khabarovsk Krai, Russia

- Coat of arms of Khabarovsk Krai

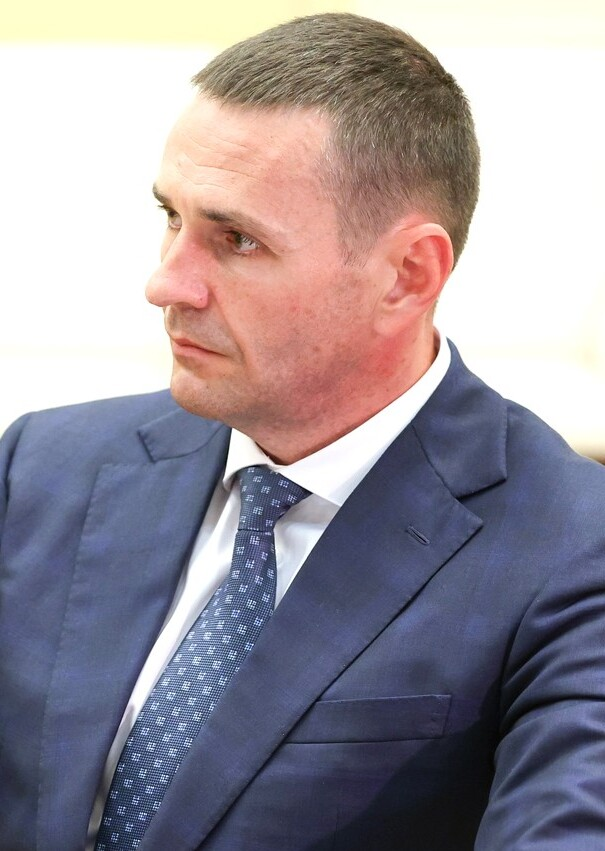
- Incumbent; Dmitry Demeshin since 13 September 2024
- Seat: Khabarovsk
- Nominator: Popular vote
- Term length: 5 years
- Inaugural holder: Viktor Ishayev
- Formation: 1991
- Website: khabkrai.ru

The governor of Khabarovsk Krai (Russian: Губернатор Хабаровского края, romanized: Gubernator Khabarovskogo kraya) is the highest official of Khabarovsk Krai, a federal subject of Russia, situated in the Far Eastern region of the country. The governor is elected by direct popular vote for the term of five years.

== History of office ==
After the August putsch of 1991 in the USSR, the democratic leadership of Russia began to create new executive structures in the regions: Soviet-era ispolkoms (executive committees) were replaced by administrations. On 24 October 1991 president of Russia Boris Yeltsin appointed former first deputy chairman of Khabarovsk Krai ispolkom Viktor Ishayev as Head of Administration of Khabarovsk Krai. From 1 November 2001 the office is styled as Governor of Khabarovsk Krai.

== List of officeholders ==
No.	Portrait	Governor	Tenure	Time in office	Party	Election
1		Viktor Ishayev (born 1948)	24 October 1991 – 30 April 2009 (resigned)	17 years, 188 days	Independent → United Russia	Appointed 1996; 2000; 2004; 2007 (Note: Appointed by the president of Russia with the consent of the Legislative Duma of Khabarovsk Krai.)
—		Vyacheslav Shport (born 1954)	30 April 2009 – 6 May 2009	9 years, 151 days	United Russia	Acting
2		Vyacheslav Shport (born 1954)	6 May 2009 – 30 April 2013 (term end)	9 years, 151 days	United Russia	2009
—		Vyacheslav Shport (born 1954)	30 April 2013 – 17 September 2013	9 years, 151 days	United Russia	Acting
(2)		Vyacheslav Shport (born 1954)	17 September 2013 – 28 September 2018 (lost re-election)	9 years, 151 days	United Russia	2013
3		Sergey Furgal (born 1970)	28 September 2018 – 20 July 2020 (removed)	1 year, 296 days	Liberal Democratic	2018
—		Mikhail Degtyarev (born 1981)	20 July 2020 – 24 September 2021	3 years, 299 days	Liberal Democratic	Acting
4		Mikhail Degtyarev (born 1981)	24 September 2021 – 14 May 2024 (resigned)	3 years, 299 days	Liberal Democratic	2021
—		Aleksandr Nikitin (born 1987)	14 May 2024 – 15 May 2024	1 day	United Russia	Acting
—		Dmitry Demeshin (born 1976)	15 May 2024 – 13 September 2024	2 years, 115 days	Independent	Acting
5		Dmitry Demeshin (born 1976)	13 September 2024 – present	2 years, 115 days	Independent	2024
