= Vika Tsyganova =

- Викто́рия Ю́рьевна Цыгано́ва
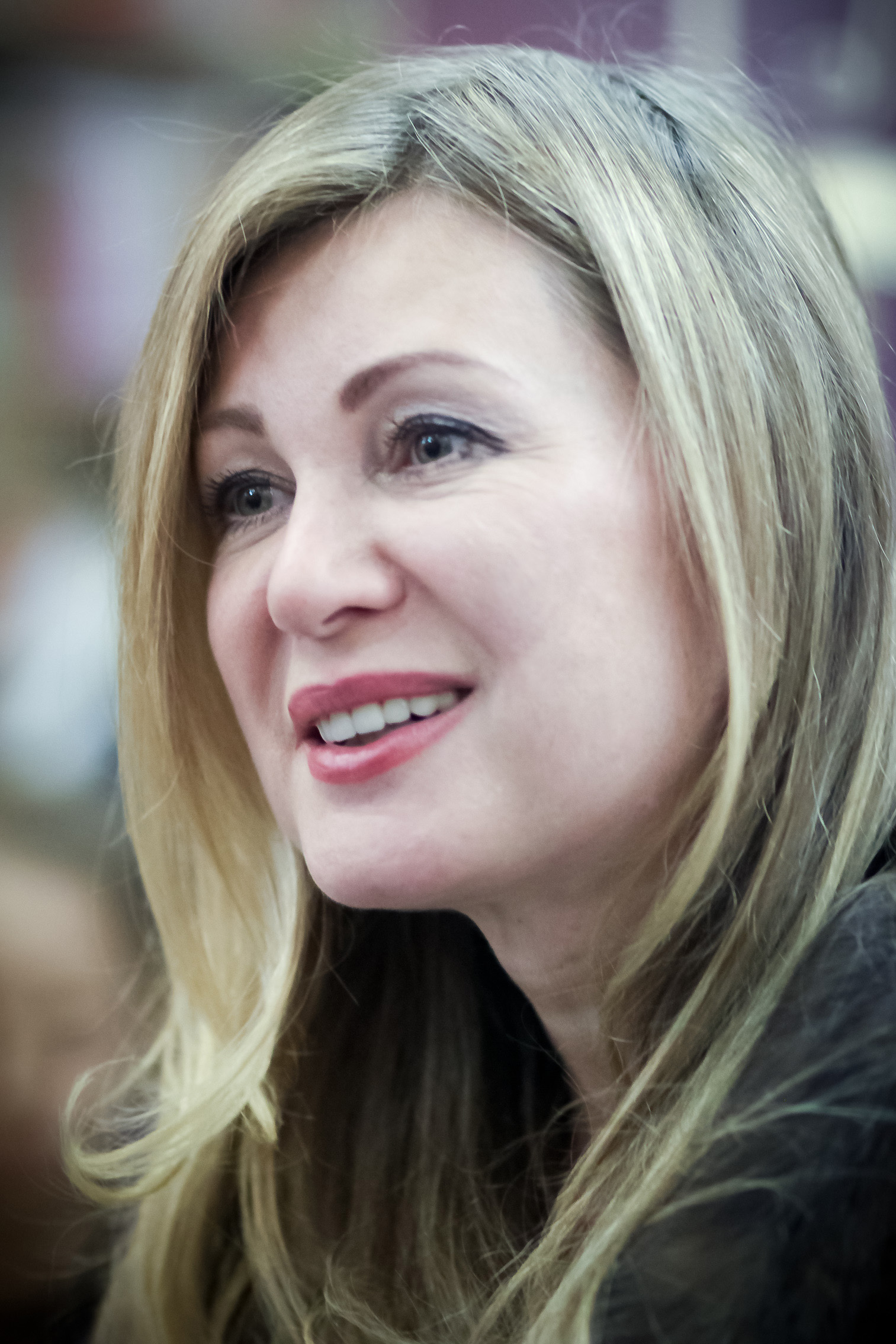
- Born: 28 October 1963 (age 62); Khabarovsk, RSFSR, Soviet Union
- Citizenship: Russian
- Education: Far Eastern State Institute of Arts
- Occupations: Singer, composer politician
- Political party: United Russia

Viktoria Yuryevna (Vika) Tsyganova (Russian: Викто́рия Ю́рьевна (Ви́ка) Цыгано́ва; born October 28, 1963, Khabarovsk, USSR) is a Soviet and Russian singer, composer, theater Actor. Honored Artist of the Republic of Tyva (1999), Honored Cultural Figure of the Moscow Oblast.

== Biography ==
Victoria Yuryevna Zhukova was born on October 28, 1963, in the city of Khabarovsk into a family of a naval officer, Yuri Alexandrovich Zhukov (a native of Leningrad, who served at the base of the Amur Military Flotilla). Her mother Lyudmila Mikhailovna Zhukova, née Volkova, worked as a director of a kindergarten. Viktoria has a sister – Svetlana, who studied at a music school. Tsyganova graduated from a music school in Khabarovsk.

=== Acting ===
From 1981 to 1985, she studied at the Far Eastern State Institute of Arts (Vladivostok), specializing in "theater and film actress", workshop of Sergei Grishko. While studying at the Far Eastern Institute of Arts, she studied vocals with the senior lecturer of the Opera Singing Department Natalia Alekseevna Shishlyannikova. In her graduation performance, Victoria played the role of Lipochka in Alexander Ostrovsky's play It's a Family Affair-We'll Settle It Ourselves.

In 1985, she began working at the Jewish Chamber Musical Theater. In 1986, she worked at the regional drama theater in Ivanovo, in 1987–1988 – at the Youth Musical Theater of the Magadan Philharmonic.

Among the roles played: Gitel Moska in the play "Let's All Together" (directed by Y. Sherling), Zoya – in the play based on L. Leonov's play "The Snowstorm" (directed by E. Tabachnikov), leading roles in the plays "Hit, Hit, Only Hit!" (directed by M. Levenbuk) and "Cat Leopold" (directed by A. Vilkov).

Later she took up musical activities, but in 2004 she took part in the filming of the TV series "At the Corner of Patriarch's Ponds – 4", playing the role of herself.

=== Musical activities ===
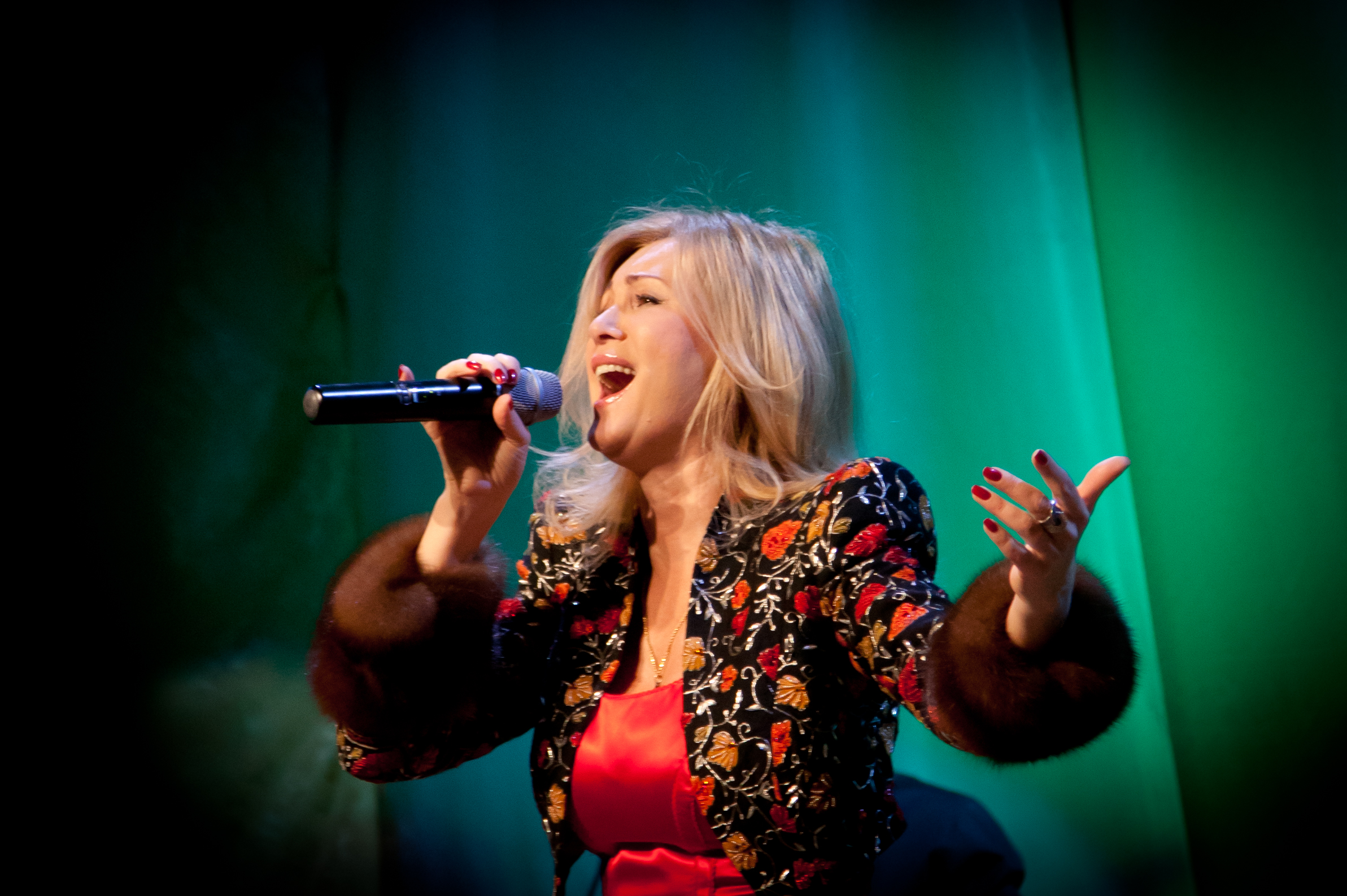
Tsyganova in Severodvinsk, 2014

Since 1988 Victoria Zhukova has become the soloist of the group "More". In the next two years, the group released the albums "Caravel of Love" and "Autumn Day". In 1988–1989 she was engaged in touring activities. One of the songs performed by Viktoria Zhukova won a prize at the All-Union competition "Song of the Year-89".

In 1990 she began performing solo, working with composer Yuri Pryalkin and poet Vadim Tsyganov. In 1991, under the name of Vika Tsyganova, she released her first solo album "Walk, Anarchy". Her first solo performance took place two years later at the Moscow Variety Theater.

In 1996–1997 instead of hooligan and patriotic songs, she began performing lyrical songs, including a cycle of lyrical ballads from the collection "Only Love", from the album "Kalina Krasnaya" and Russian romances from the album of the same name.

In 1998 she changed her image, began singing songs with elements of rock and roll, rock and pop, released the album "Solntse" and a series of music videos.

In 2001 she worked together with the chansonnier singer Mikhail Krug. In 2002, the album in memory of Krug, "Dedication", was released, containing eight duet works, and the collection "Russian Vodka. The Best Songs" from the series "Legends of the Genre".

Back in 2002, on Russian Navy Day, she performed in Sevastopol on the flagship of the Black Sea Fleet, the missile cruiser "Moskva".

The album "Come to My Home" was recognized as the winner in the nomination "Album of the Year" at the "Chanson of the Year" award ceremony.

In 2006 she released the album "Voyage-Vintage", the songs for which were created by her husband and producer Vadim Tsyganov.

In 2010 she released the album "Blue My Flowers" with music by Alexander Morozov and lyrics by Vadim Tsyganov. The song "Eternal Memory" became one of the winners of the All-Russian competition "Spring of Victory".

In 2020 after a ten-year break, she released the album "Fyodor Grebet", dedicated to the traveler and artist Fyodor Konyukhov.

In 2021 Vika Tsyganova took part in the musical television show "Superstar! Return" on the NTV channel. write State University of Education – Государственный университет просвещения

=== Political views ===
On April 4, 2014, Tsyganova presented Gennady Zyuganov with his father's award sheet. Earlier, Tsyganova had been given this document by two veterans during her street concert in Sevastopol. The award sheet had been kept in the city archive since the Great Patriotic War. The leader of the Communist Party of the Russian Federation presented V. Yu. Tsyganova with a commemorative medal of the Central Committee of the Communist Party of the Russian Federation "90 Years of the USSR" for her contribution to the patriotic education of youth.

From May 4 to 7, 2014, the leader of the Communist Party of the Russian Federation, Gennady Zyuganov was on a working visit to Crimea and Sevastopol, annexed by Russia. Tsyganova also performed at a festive concert organized by the party in Sevastopol. There, she and her husband, Vadim Tsyganov, were awarded medals of the Central Committee of the Communist Party of the Russian Federation "70 Years of the Liberation of Crimea and Sevastopol".

During the 2018 presidential election, she was a confidant of Vladimir Putin. In 2019, she became a candidate for deputy of the State Duma from the Komsomolsky electoral district from the United Russia party. She lost the election to the LDPR candidate Ivan Pilyaev.

In February 2022, she supported Russia's invasion of Ukraine. She justified her support for the invasion by the main myths and narratives of Russian anti-Ukrainian propaganda. In October 2022, she published a video for the song "Wagner", which became the unofficial anthem of the Wagner Group, and performed with other pro-Kremlin performers at pro-government events. She was in support of the Russian attack.

In October 2023, Yury Dud published an interview with Vika Tsyganova and her husband. In a conversation with a journalist, Tsyganova stated that she supports the war in Ukraine because of Orthodoxy, belief in a number of conspiracy theories, including the existence of a world government that deceived Vladimir Putin, and respect for the mercenaries of the Wagner Group. After the interview was released, Tsyganova called for people not to watch it, since it was “generated by a neural network”.
