= Far Eastern State Medical University =

Public medical school in Khabarovsk, Russia

- Дальневосточный государственный медицинский университет
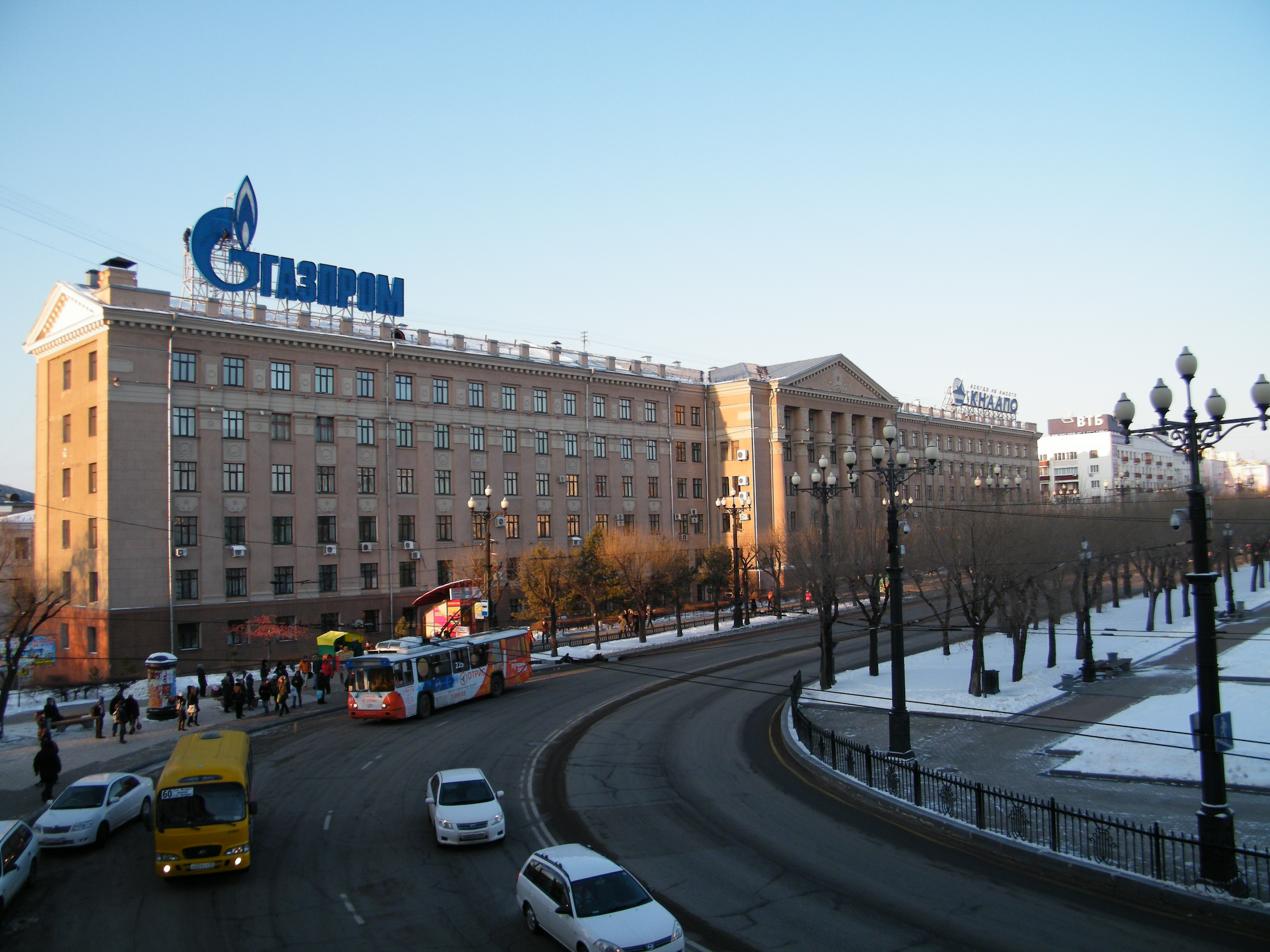
- Type: Public
- Established: 7 December 1929
- Location: 35 Muravyeva-Amurskogo street, Khabarovsk, Russia; 48°28′52″N 135°04′14″E
- Campus: Urban
- Website: www.fesmu.ru

Far Eastern State Order of the Red Banner of Labour Medical University (Russian: Федеральное государственное бюджетное образовательное учреждение высшего образования «Дальневосточный государственный медицинский университет» Министерства здравоохранения Российской Федерации) is a medical higher education institution in Khabarovsk, founded in 1929.

== History ==
A shortage of medical personnel in the early years of Soviet power hampered the development of healthcare in the Far East. The few medical faculties at Soviet universities were unable to provide the necessary medical staff for remote areas of the country.

The Far Eastern (Khabarovsk since 1939) State Medical Institute was established by Resolution No. 65 of the Council of People's Commissars of the RSFSR dated May 24, 1929. In accordance with this resolution, on December 7, 1929, the Presidium of the Regional Executive Committee issued a resolution authorizing the construction of higher education institutions in the city of Khabarovsk, including the establishment of a medical institute. The institute was housed in the two-story building of the former Lenin Secondary School, which had housed a girls' gymnasium before the Revolution (now the second academic building). The top floor was used as a dormitory. By 1935, two more floors were added, giving the building a four-story structure.

On October 2, 1930, 106 first-year students began their scheduled classes. Initially, recruiting students was difficult due to the very small number of young people in the region with a secondary (then nine-year) education. The number of students at the institute, as noted by the Secretariat of the Far Eastern Regional Committee of the All-Union Communist Party (Bolsheviks) in January 1932, significantly lagged behind the region's need for doctors. The Secretariat of the Far Eastern Regional Committee ordered the city and district committees of the All-Union Communist Party (Bolsheviks) to ensure the institute's staffing, and the regional Komsomol Committee was instructed to mobilize 200 Komsomol members for medical studies.

In 1931, a workers' faculty (Rabfak) was established at the institute, and in 1932, a branch was opened in Artem. At that time, the workers' faculties provided organized pre-university training for prospective students who initially lacked a secondary education. The workers' faculty existed until 1938. In 1932, a correspondence department was opened at the university, later transformed into an evening department, which existed until 1935. The evening department was reopened twice more (five graduates graduated from 1965 to 1976; two graduates of physicians graduated from 1982 to 1990).

In its early years, the university lacked the necessary equipment and teaching aids, and there was no reading room. The clinical facilities included a 150-bed regional hospital, a 50-bed railway hospital, a 75-bed psychiatric hospital, and a 150-bed district military hospital. Several departments typically operated within a single clinical site. The Department of Faculty Surgery also housed the Department of Hospital Surgery. Both departments were headed by Professor S. V. Geynats. However, all the difficulties of its development were successfully overcome. By 1935, the institute already had 23 departments, and the student body exceeded 500. That same year, the first graduating class graduated, with 70 students receiving diplomas. The remaining 36 students who entered the university in 1930 received their mid-level medical degrees after completing their third year.

In the 2010s, the Far Eastern State Medical University admitted approximately 200 applicants per faculty.
