= Kuzbass State Technical University =

Technical university in Russia

Coordinates: 55°20′53.8″N 86°4′39.1″E

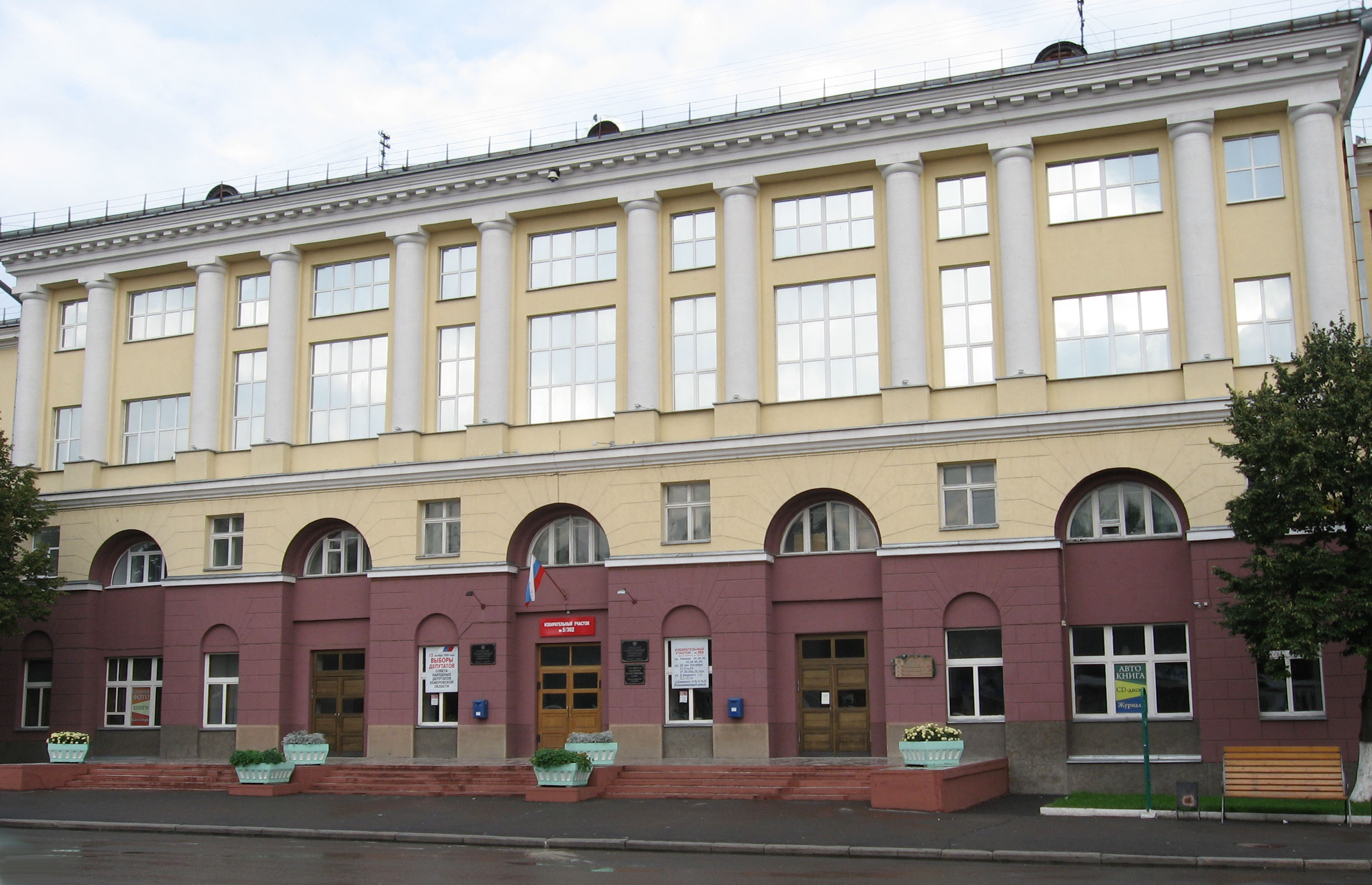
- Established: 1950
- Location: Kuzbass, Russia
- Website: http://www.kuzstu.ru

Kuzbass State Technical University (KuzSTU) is one of higher schools which trains specialists for the economy of Kuzbass, Russia.

== History ==
At first it was the Mining Institute founded on the basis of Kemerovo Mining Construction College (the order number 13718 of the Council of Ministers of the USSR of August 30, 1950 and the order number 1572 of the Minister of Higher and Secondary Special Education of September 9, 1950). Then it was reorganized in the Kuzbass Polytechnical Institute (the order number 548 of the Council of Ministers on July 14, 1965, and the order number 233 of the Minister of Higher and Secondary Special Education of the USSR. By the order number 364 of the State Committee for Higher Education of the Russian Federation of November 22, 1993 it was renamed in the Kuzbass State Technical University. The rectors of the Institute were such as T. Gorbachev (1950–1954), P. Kokorin (1954–1967), V. Kozevin (1967–1977). From 1977 to 1993 the university was headed by an academician of the Russian Academy of Sciences, Honoured Scientist of the Russian Federation, Ph.D. of science, professor M. Safokhin. From 1993 to 2003 the university was headed by professor V. Kurekhin. From 2003 to 2008 the university was headed by professor V. Nesterov. Professor Nesterov has continued his career at present days as a president of the university.

At present days the university is headed by A. Yakovlev.

== Current academics ==
Now it is the largest higher educational institution in the region. There are 684 instructors in it. 60 academicians and associate members, and there are 68 Ph. Ds. Some specialists ( including 24 Ph. Ds) of various branches of industry work at the university. At present there are 8 faculties and 52 departments, laboratories, a research institute, a computer centre, a large library and 2 museums in it. The training for 32 specialities is carried out. Some towns and cities of Kemerovo region have branches of the university (Anzhero-Sudzhensk, Belovo, Prokopyevsk, Novokuznetsk, Tashtagol, Mezhdurechensk). The total number of students is 11095. Full-time students are 7067 and students by correspondence are 4028. People working for a doctor's degree are 9 and post-graduates are 279. There is a post-graduate course for 19 specialities. People working for a doctor's degree and post-graduates can present their thesis for the Scientific Board of the university. The total number of graduates is about 52.000 engineers.

== Campus ==
Kuzbass State Technical University has 8 buildings with total area of 102578m., 2,5 hostels (one is for family students), geodesic and ski bases, a group of dining-halls. The university has necessary technical devices for computer training of students. There are more than 700 PCs and 220 terminals of total use system. The university has access to the Internet.

The book stock of the university's library is more than 500.000 copies (including 250.000 copies of study aids and 270.000 ones of research literature).

The university has connections with higher educational institutions and firms in the United States, Canada, Germany, France, Italy, Hungary, Bulgaria, Turkey, China, Mongolia. The students have a chance to study abroad.

== See also ==
- Education in Russia
- Education in Siberia
- List of universities in Russia

== Official site ==
- Kuzbass State Technical University in Russian
