= Novosibirsk State University of Architecture and Civil Engineering =

Civil engineering school in Novosibirsk, Russia

- Новосибирский государственный архитектурно-строительный университет
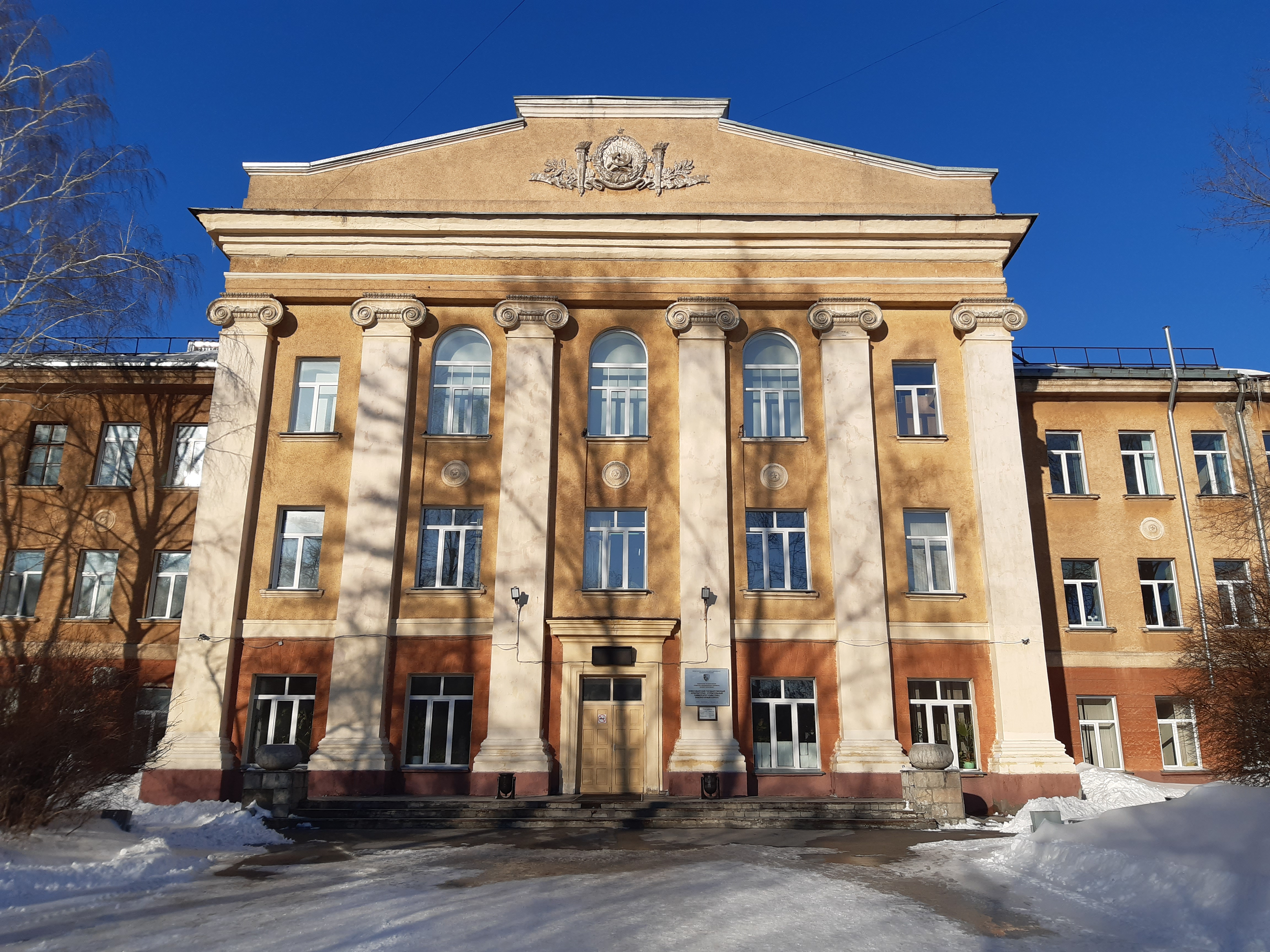
- Other names: Sibstrin
- Type: State University
- Established: 1930
- Location: Novosibirsk, Russia; 55.0170°N 82.9591°E
- Website: en.sibstrin.ru

Novosibirsk State University of Architecture and Civil Engineering (Russian: Новосибирский государственный архитектурно-строительный университет) is a state university in Oktyabrsky District of Novosibirsk, Russia. It was founded in 1930.

== History ==
The educational institution was created in 1930 on the basis of the Civil Engineering Faculty of the Siberian Institute of Technology (Tomsk).

In 1933, Siberian Technological Institute moved from Tomsk to Novosibirsk.

In 1935, the institute was renamed into Novosibirsk Civil Engineering Institute named after V.V. Kuibyshev.

In 1939, Novosibirsk Institute of Engineers of Geodesy, Aerial Photography and Cartography was organized on the basis of the Engineering and Geodetic Faculty of the institute.

In 1980 the institute was awarded the Order of the Red Banner of Labor.

In 1981, the Faculty for Working with Foreign Students was established.

In 1987–1989, Novosibirsk Architectural Institute (now Novosibirsk State University of Architecture, Design and Arts) was founded on the basis of the Faculty of Architecture of the institute.

In 1993, the institute was renamed into Novosibirsk State Academy of Civil Engineering.

In 1998, the educational institution was renamed Novosibirsk State University of Architecture and Civil Engineering.

== Faculties ==
- Faculty of Civil Engineering (since 1930)
- Environmental Engineering Faculty (since 1934)
- Faculty of Engineering and Information Technologies (since 1944)
- Center for Work with Foreign Students (since 1981)
- Institute of Architecture and Urban Planning

== Notable alumni ==
- Vadim Bakatin, Soviet and Russian politician, last chairman of the KGB
- Sergey Levchenko, Russian politician, the Governor of Irkutsk Oblast (2015–2019)
