= Amur State Medical Academy =

- Амурская государственная медицинская академия
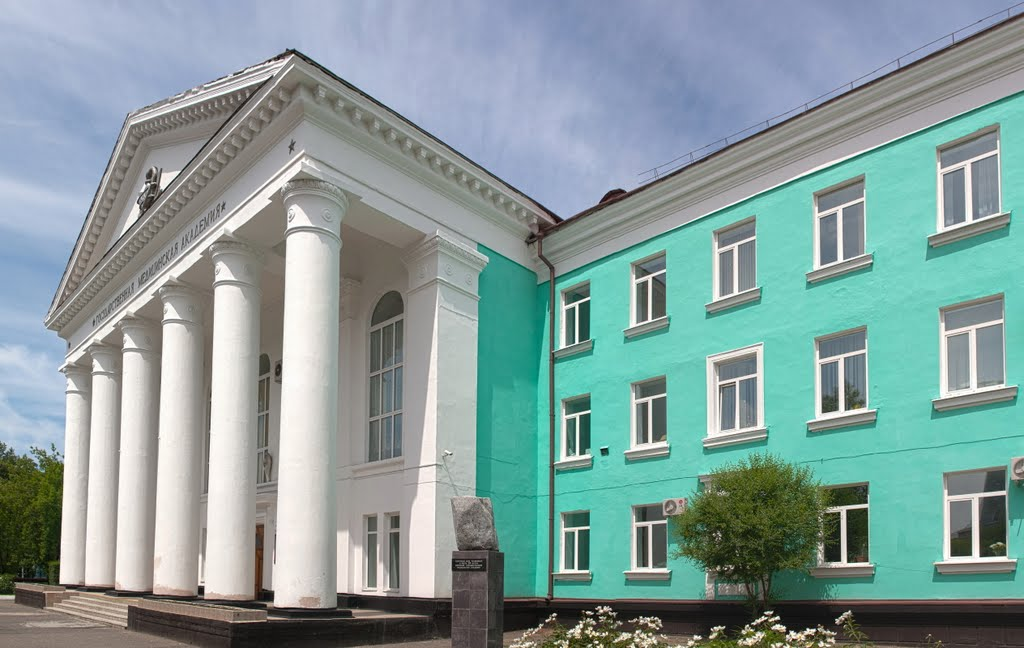
- Motto: We have someone to be proud of, we have something to be proud of!
- Established: 1952
- Location: Blagoveshchensk, Amur Oblast, Russia; 50°15′56″N 127°32′45″E
- Website: amursma.ru
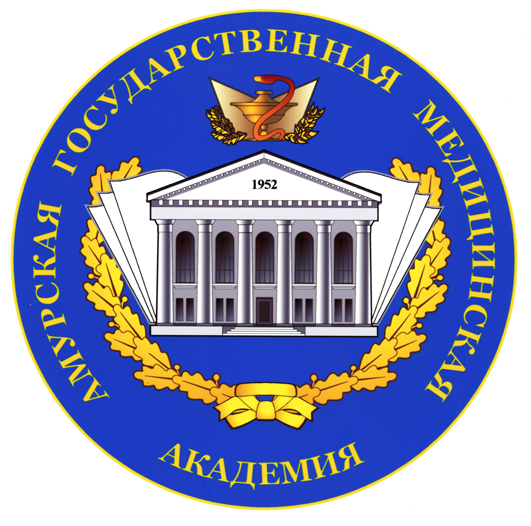

Amur State Medical Academy (Russian: Амурская государственная медицинская академия) is a Russian higher medical educational institution established in 1952 and located in Blagoveshchensk, capital of Amur Oblast in the Russian Far East, Russia.

== History ==
In the post-war period, there was an increased influx of people to the Russian Far East. Among those who arrived were graduates of many of the country's leading universities. In 1947, the Council of Ministers of the Soviet Union and the Ministry of Health of the RSFSR raised the issue of organizing and opening a medical institute in Blagoveshchensk. Since a medical institute needed to have a clinical base, in December 1948 the Council of Ministers of the Soviet Union adopted a resolution on the beginning of design and survey work on the Amur Regional Hospital (now the Amur Regional Children's Hospital); in 1949, its construction began; in 1952, the opening took place. On June 23, 1952, the Council of Ministers of the Soviet Union issued an order on the organization of the Blagoveshchensk-on-Amur State Medical Institute (BSMI) on August 1, 1952, with an annual admission of 200 people, as well as on the construction of a standard dormitory (1953) and an academic building (1954).

In 1996, the university was transformed into the Amur State Medical Academy and accepted into the Association of Medical Schools of Europe, which made it possible to unify the training of doctors with pan-European standards.
