= Aleksandr Nikitin (politician, born 1987) =

Russian politician

- Nikitin in 2023

Member of the State Duma
- Incumbent
- Assumed office 30 September 2026

Deputy Minister of Sports
- In office 14 May 2024 – 30 September 2026
- Prime Minister: Mikhail Mishustin
- Minister: Mikhail Degtyarev
- Preceded by: Andrey Fyodorov

Governor of the Khabarovsk Krai (acting)
- In office 12 May 2024 – 15 May 2024
- Preceded by: Mikhail Degtyarev
- Succeeded by: Dmitry Demeshin

Vice-Governor of the Khabarovsk Krai
- In office 24 September 2021 – 14 May 2024
- Governor: Mikhail Degtyarev

First Deputy Chairman of the Government the Khabarovsk Krai
- In office 20 July 2020 – 24 September 2021
- Preceded by: Vladimir Khlapov

Chief of Staff of the Committee of the State Duma
- In office 5 October 2016 – 20 July 2020

Personal details
- Born: Aleksandr Aleksandrovich Nikitin; 27 October 1987 (age 39) Bender, Moldavian SSR, Soviet Union (now Moldova)
- Party: United Russia.

Aleksandr Aleksandrovich Nikitin (Russian: Александр Александрович Никитин; born 27 October 1987), is a Russian politician who is a member of the State Duma since 30 September 2026.

He had been the Deputy Minister of Sports of the 2024 to 2026.

He has briefly served as the Governor of Khabarovsk Krai in May 2024, having served as the Vice Governor of the Khabarovsk Krai from 2021 to 2024.

He is the full State Councilor of the Russian Federation, 3rd class, and had been the Vice-President of the Russian Olympic Committee.

== Biography ==
Aleksandr Nikitin was born on 27 October 1987 in Bender, in the Moldavian SSR of the Soviet Union (now in Moldova, under Transnistrian control).

In 2012, he graduated from Moscow State University with a degree in international relations, a specialist in the field of international relations.

In 2015, he was a graduate student at Moscow State University.

In 2012, Nikitin was an assistant to a member of the State Duma. He was in this position until 2014.

From 2014 to 2016, he was a senior inspector of the Investigative Committee of the Russian Federation.

From 2016 to 2020 he was the head of the staff of the State Duma Committee of the VII convocation on physical culture, sports, tourism and youth affairs.

From 2018 to 2020, he was a member of the working group on improving the legislation in the field of physical culture and sports of the Council under the President of the Russian Federation for the Development of Physical Culture and Sports.

From September 2021, he was the first vice-governor of the Khabarovsk Krai.

In 2023, he became a member of the United Russia party.

On 12 May 2024, Nikitin was appointed acting governor of Khabrovsk Krai, until 15 May, when being replaced by Dmitry Demeshin as the acting governor. A day later, he was the deputy minister of sports.

On 30 September 2026, Niktin became a member of the State Duma.

== Awards ==
2022 - Commendation of the President of the Russian Federation "For his contribution to the preparation and holding of socially significant events"

2023 - Certificate of Honor from the President of the Russian Federation "For labor achievements and many years of diligent work"

2024 — Medal of the Order of Merit for the Fatherland, II degree, for labor achievements and many years of diligent work.

He has been awarded numerous departmental and regional awards.
