= Novosibirsk State University of Architecture, Design and Arts =

Other organization in Novosibirsk, Russia

Kryachkov Novosibirsk State University of Architecture, Design and Arts
- Новосибирский государственный университет архитектуры, дизайна и искусств имени А.Д.Крячкова
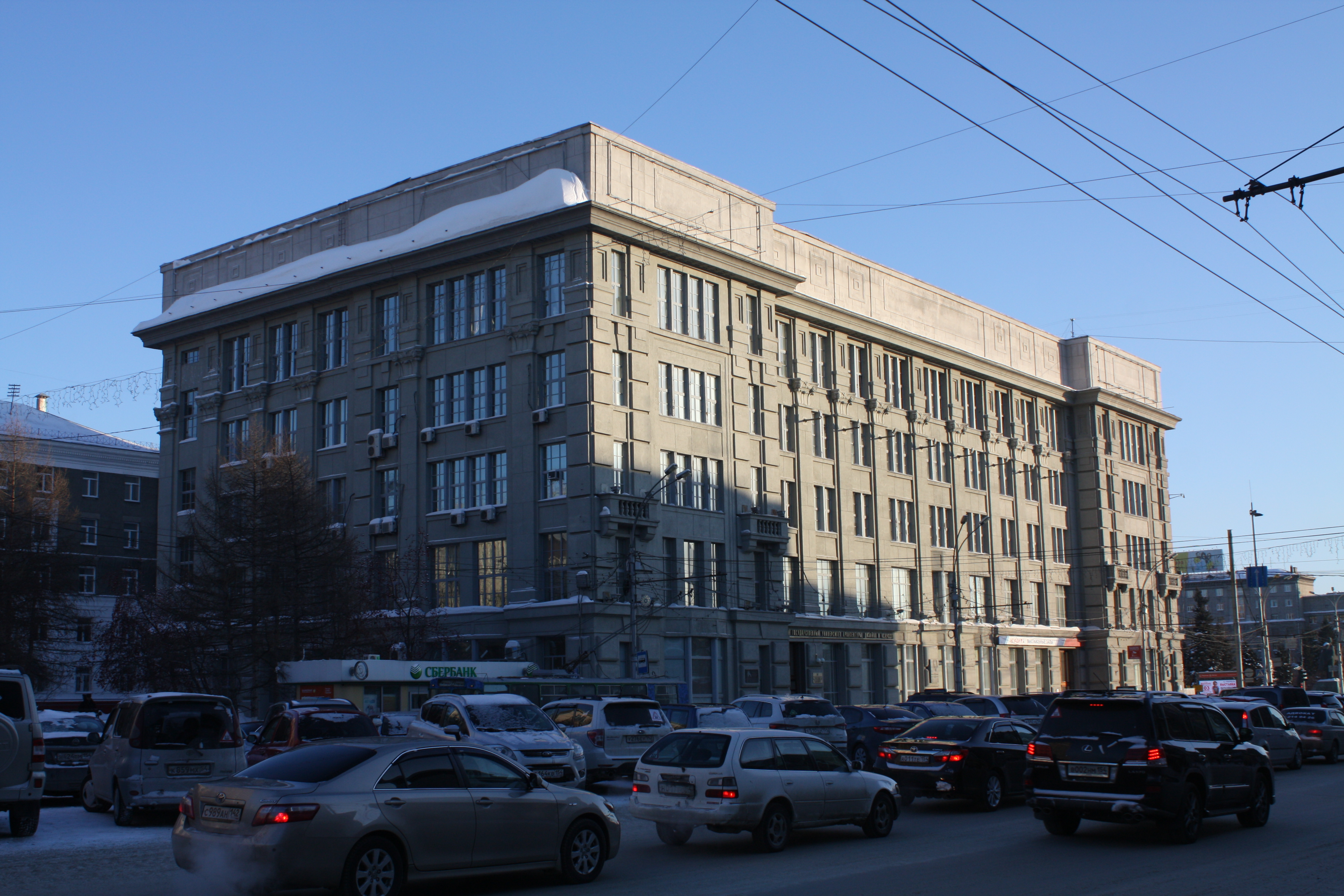
- Type: State University
- Established: 1989
- Location: Novosibirsk, Russia; 55.0312°N 82.9207°E
- Website: nsuada.ru

Kryachkov Novosibirsk State University of Architecture, Design and Arts (Russian: Новосибирский государственный университет архитектуры, дизайна и искусств имени А. Д. Крячкова) is a state university in Tsentralny District, Novosibirsk, Russia. It was founded in 1989.

== History ==
In 1987–1989, the Novosibirsk Architectural Institute was founded on the basis of the Faculty of Architecture of the Novosibirsk State University of Architecture and Civil Engineering.

In 1996, the institute was renamed the Novosibirsk State Academy of Architecture and Art.

In 2015, the academy was renamed the Novosibirsk State University of Architecture, Design and Arts (NSUADA).

By Order No. 1075 of the Ministry of Science and Higher Education of the Russian Federation dated October 14, 2019, the University was named after Andrey Kryachkov
