= Viktor Ishayev =

Russian politician

- Виктор Ишаев
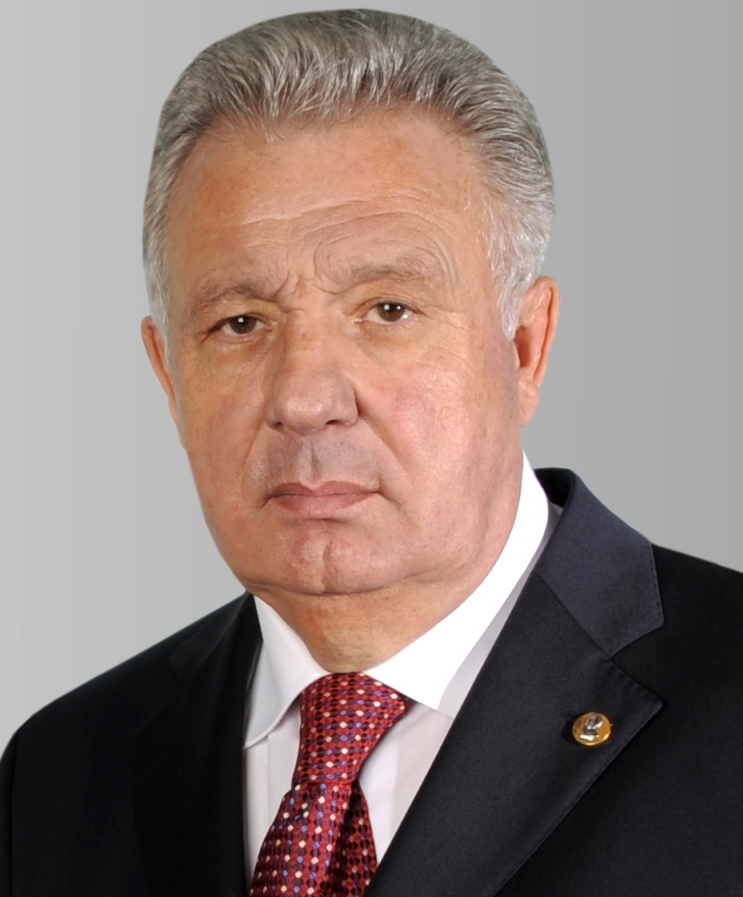

Minister for Development of the Russian Far East and Presidential Envoy to the Far Eastern Federal District
- In office 21 May 2012 – 31 August 2013
- President: Vladimir Putin
- Prime Minister: Dmitry Medvedev
- Preceded by: Office established
- Succeeded by: Yury Trutnev (as Envoy); Aleksandr Galushka (as Minister)

Presidential Envoy to the Far Eastern Federal District
- In office 30 April 2009 – 21 May 2012
- President: Dmitry Medvedev; Vladimir Putin
- Preceded by: Oleg Safonov
- Succeeded by: Yury Trutnev

1st Governor of Khabarovsk Krai
- In office 1 November 2001 – 30 April 2009
- Preceded by: Office established
- Succeeded by: Vyacheslav Shport

Head of the Administration of Khabarovsk Krai
- In office 24 October 1991 – 1 November 2001
- Preceded by: Office established
- Succeeded by: Office restyled

Personal details
- Born: Victor Ivanovich Ishayev; 16 April 1948 (age 78) Sergeyevka, Yaysky District, Kemerovo Oblast, Russian SFSR, Soviet Union
- Party: United Russia
- Other political affiliations: CPSU (19??–91)
- Spouse: Lyubov Ishayeva
- Education: Novosibirsk Institute for Engineers of Water Transport

Victor Ivanovich Ishayev (Russian: Виктор Иванович Ишаев, born 16 April 1948) is a Russian politician. He has the federal state civilian service rank of 1st class Active State Councillor of the Russian Federation.

He had been the Presidential plenipotentiary envoy in the Far Eastern Federal District of Russia from 2009 to 2012, the governor of Khabarovsk Krai from 1991 to 2009, and a Deputy of the Federation Council of the Federal Assembly of the Russian Federation from 1993 to 2001.

On 21 May 2012, he was appointed as Minister for Russian Far East in the Dmitry Medvedev's Cabinet.

On 28 March 2019, he was arrested in Moscow on charges of abuse of power and embezzlement.

== Property and income ==
According to official data, Ishayev's income was 6.37 million rubles in 2011, his wife's income was 3.37 million rubles. Together with his wife, Ishayev owns a land plot of 22 acres, a house, two apartments, two Mercedes-Benz cars and a Glastron boat.

== Honours and awards ==
- Order of Merit for the Fatherland;
  - 2nd class (16 April 2008) – for services to the state, a large contribution to the socio-economic development of the region and many years of fruitful work
  - 3rd class (5 August 2003) – for outstanding contribution to strengthening Russian statehood, and many years of honest work
  - 4th class (2 March 1999) – for hard work and consistent application of the course of economic reforms
- Order of Honour (1996)
- Order of Labour Glory, 3rd class
- Order of the Holy Prince Daniel of Moscow, 1st and 2nd classes
- Gratitude of the President of the Russian Federation (19 February 2001) – for outstanding contribution to strengthening Russian statehood
- Gratitude of the President of the Russian Federation (25 August 2005) – for active participation in the work of the State Council FederatsiiRasporyazhenie President of the Russian Federation of 25 August 2005 No. 368-rp "On the Promotion of the State Council of the Russian Federation"
- Diploma of the Government of the Russian Federation (27 May 1998) – for his great personal contribution to the socio-economic development of the Khabarovsk Territory and long conscientious work
- Diploma of the Government of the Russian Federation (16 April 2008) – for his great personal contribution to the socio-economic development of the Khabarovsk Territory and long conscientious work
- Medal "For Merits in National Security" (Security Council of Russia, 2010)

Political offices
Preceded by Office established	Governor of Khabarovsk Krai; 2001 – 2009	Succeeded by Vyacheslav Shport
