= Maxim Ivanov (politician, born 1987) =

Russian politician

Maxim Ivanov MP
- Максим Иванов
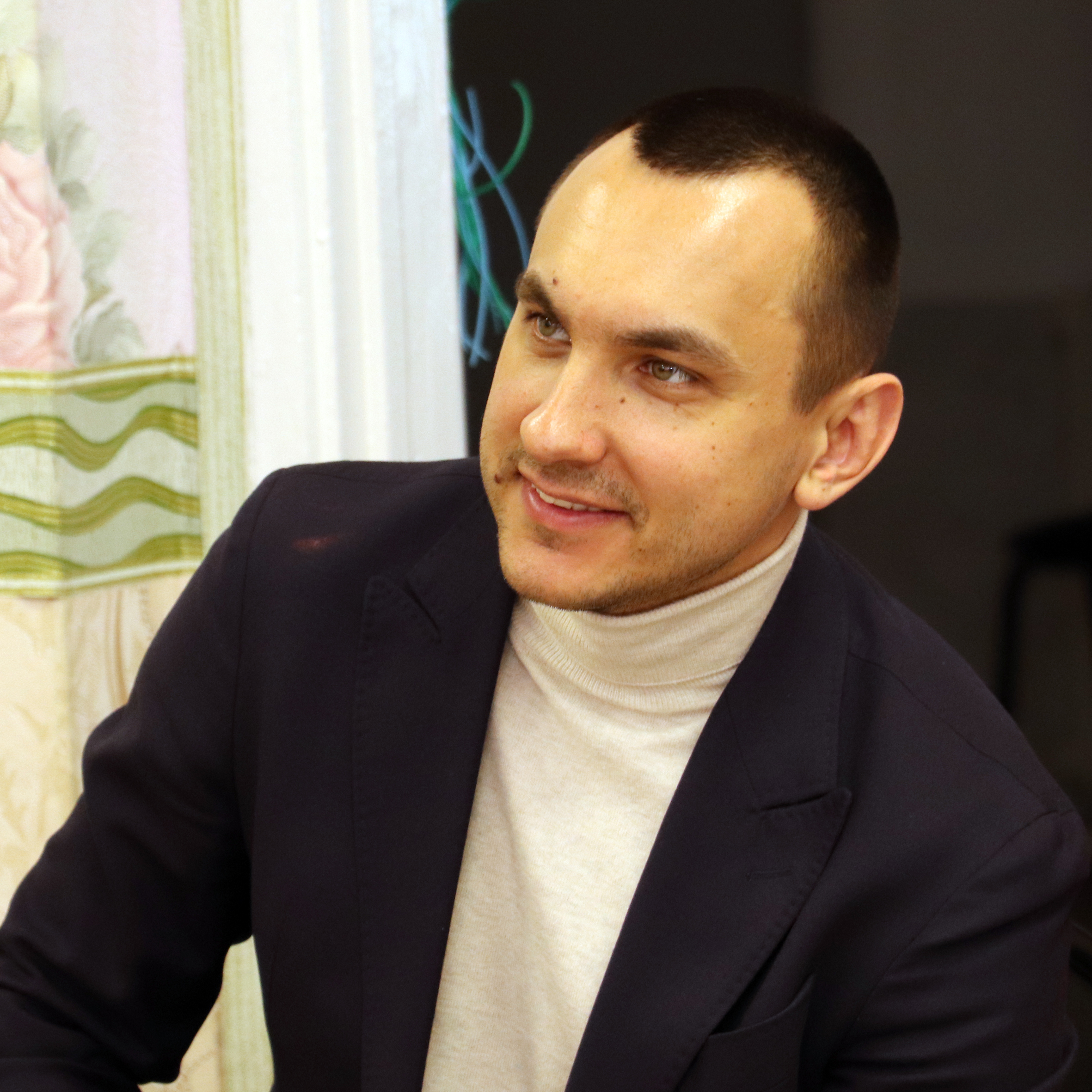

Member of the State Duma (Party List Seat)
- Incumbent
- Assumed office 12 October 2021

Personal details
- Born: 23 May 1987 (age 39) Berezovka, Khabarovsky District, Khabarovsk Krai, RSFSR, USSR
- Party: United Russia
- Education: RANEPA; Khabarovsk State Academy of Economics and Law

Maxim Yevgenyevich Ivanov (Note: also transliterated as Maksim Evgenievich Ivanov) (Russian: Максим Евгеньевич Иванов; born 23 May 1987 in Berezovka, Khabarovsky District, Khabarovsk Krai) is a Russian political figure and a deputy of the 8th State Duma.

In 2010, Maxim Ivanov joined the United Russia. On 14 September 2014 he was elected deputy of the Khabarovsk City Duma of the 6th convocation. In 2019, he was appointed acting secretary of the Khabarovsk branch of the United Russia; in June 2021, he was elected as a secretary. He left the post in September 2021 when he was elected deputy of the 8th State Duma. He joined the Committee on Ecology, Natural Resources and Environmental Protection.

== Sanctions ==
He was sanctioned by the UK government in 2022 in relation to the Russo-Ukrainian War.

He is one of the members of the State Duma the United States Treasury sanctioned on 24 March 2022 in response to the 2022 Russian invasion of Ukraine.
