= Aleksandr Shishkin =

Russian footballer

Personal information
- Full name: Aleksandr Valeryevich Shishkin
- Date of birth: 13 October 1966 (age 60)
- Height: 1.96 m (6 ft 5 in)
- Position: Goalkeeper

Youth career
- FC Spartak Moscow

Senior career*
Years	Team	Apps	(Gls)
1983–1986	FC Spartak Moscow	0	(0)
1988	FC Okean Kerch	3	(0)
1989–1990	FC Geolog Tyumen	12	(0)
1991–1992	FC Asmaral Moscow	42	(0)
- * Club domestic league appearances and goals

Aleksandr Valeryevich Shishkin (Russian: Александр Валерьевич Шишкин; born 13 October 1966) is a former Russian football player.
