= Far Eastern State Institute of Arts =

- Дальневосточный государственный институт искусств
- Type: Public
- Established: 14 January 1962
- Address: 3 Petra Velikogo str, Vladivostok, Russia; 43°06′55″N 131°53′34″E
- Website: dv-art.ru

Far Eastern State Institute of Arts (Russian: Дальневосточный государственный институт искусств) is a Russian state higher education institution located in the city of Vladivostok, Russia.

== History ==
It was established on January 14, 1962, as the Far Eastern Pedagogical Institute of Arts. In 1992, it was renamed the Far Eastern State Institute of Arts. In 2000, it was renamed the Far Eastern State Academy of Arts. In 2009, the institute received operational management of the historic building of the Pushkin People's House for reconstruction and adaptation into a second academic building. Since 2017, restoration work has been underway in the building. In 2016, it was renamed the Far Eastern State Institute of Arts.
