= Komsomolsk-on-Amur State University =

State university in Russia

- Комсомольский-на-Амуре государственный университет
- Type: Public
- Established: 1955
- Students: 5300
- Location: Lenina 27, Komsomolsk-on-Amur, Russia; 50.546850199837124°N 137.0039371011397°E
- Campus: Urban
- Nickname: КнАГУ
- Website: www.knastu.ru Building details
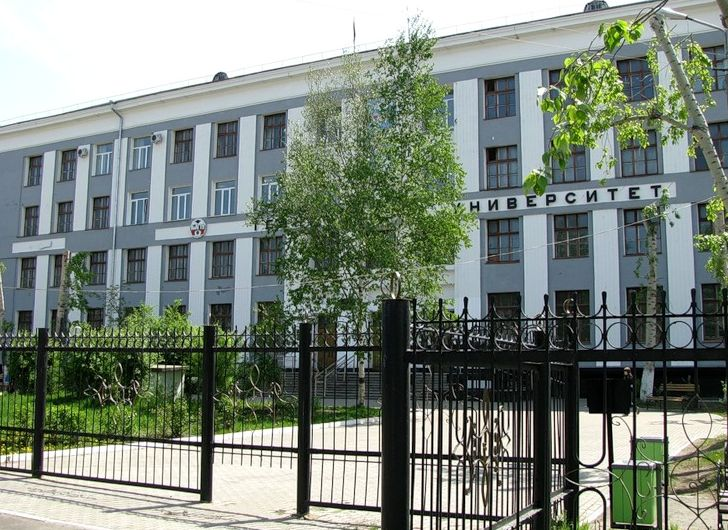

Komsomolsk-on-Amur State University (Russian: «Федеральное государственное бюджетное образовательное учреждение высшего образования „Комсомольский-на-Амуре государственный университет“» is a university located in Komsomolsk-on-Amur, a city in the Khabarovsk Krai in the Russian Far East.

== History ==
With the development of heavy industry in the Far East and the construction of large industrial enterprises in Komsomolsk-on-Amur, the city began to feel an acute shortage of highly qualified engineering personnel.

On June 17, 1955, the Komsomolsiy-on-Amur Evening Polytechnic Institute (KnAVPI) was opened as part of the mechanical-technological and construction faculties

For the first three years, the Institute did not even have its own building. Classes were held in the premises of the Pedagogical Institute, the Polytechnic College, the training and production plant. In October 1956, the construction of the educational building began. Since 2017, it has been renamed Komsomolsk-on-Amur State University (KnAGU).
